= Gaeta Cathedral =

Cathedral in Gaeta, Italy

- Cathedral of Saints Erasmus and Marcian and St. Mary of the Assumption
- Cattedrale dei Santi Erasmo e Marciano e di Santa Maria Assunta
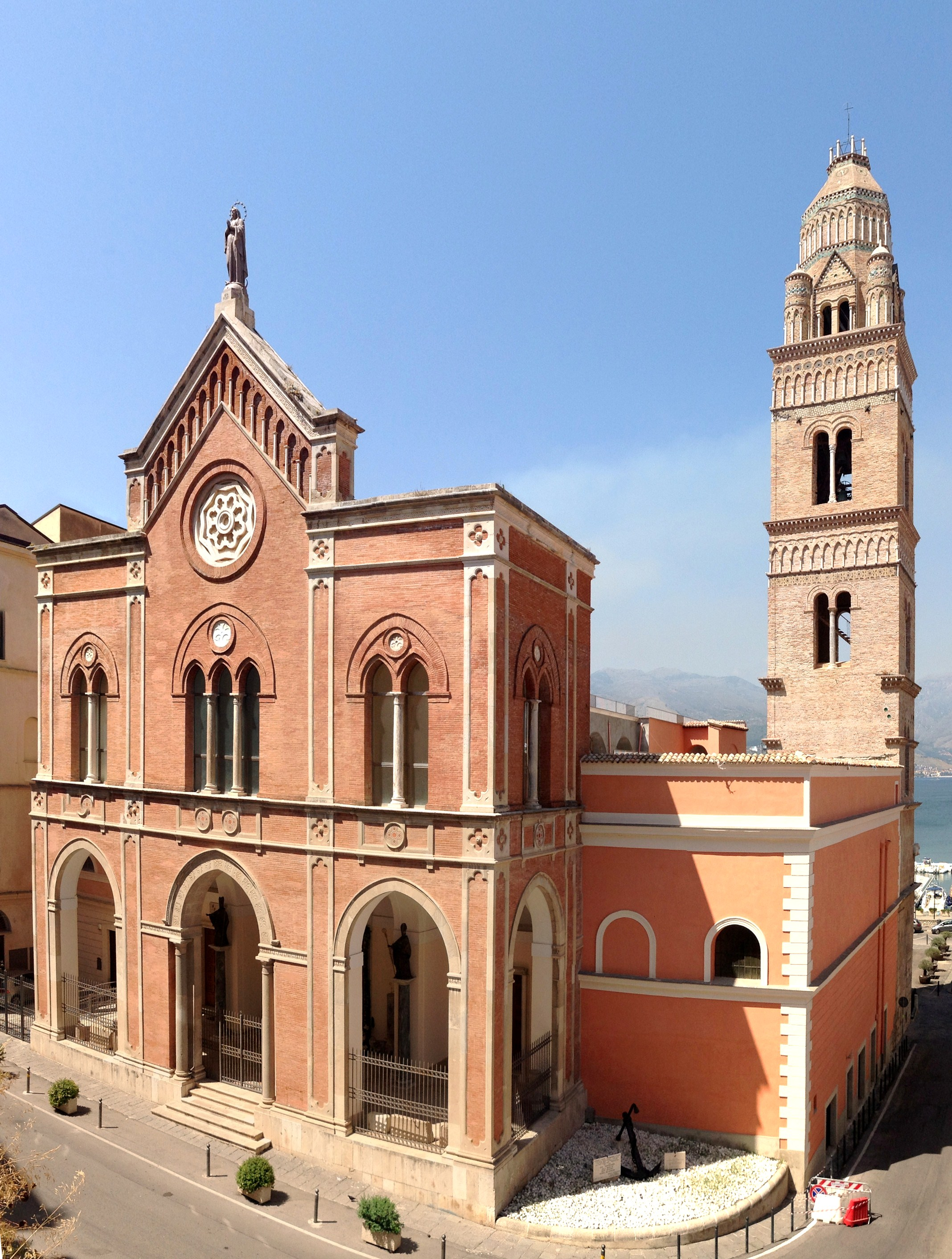
- Façade and bell tower

- Location within Italy
- 41°12′32.2″N 13°35′12.5″E
- Location: Gaeta, Lazio, Italy
- Address: Via Duomo, 24
- Denomination: Catholic
- Sui iuris church: Latin Church
- Tradition: Roman Rite
- Website: cattedralegaeta.it

History
- Status: Cathedral
- Dedication: Erasmus of Formia, Marcian of Syracuse, Saint Mary of the Assumption
- Consecrated: January 22, 1106, May 28, 1793, November 23, 1950, September 27, 2014

Architecture
- Style: Romanesque architecture (bell tower) Neo-Gothic (façade) Baroque-Neoclassical (interior)
- Groundbreaking: 11th-12th century
- Completed: 1950

Administration
- Archdiocese: Gaeta

The Gaeta Cathedral, more formally the Cathedral of Saints Erasmus and Marcian and St. Mary of the Assumption (Italian: Cattedrale di Gaeta; Cattedrale dei Santi Erasmo e Marciano e di Santa Maria Assunta), is the most important place of Catholic worship in Gaeta, Italy, the mother church of the archdiocese of the same name and the seat of the parish of Mary Most Holy Assumed into Heaven (Italian: Maria Santissima Assunta in Cielo).

The cathedral was built on the site of the older church of Santa Maria del Parco, beginning in the 9th century and enlarged several times. In the 13th century it assumed a seven-aisle structure that remained unaltered under later additions; major interventions were made in the 17th century, carried out by the Lazzari family, which rebuilt the present apse and the crypt dating from the end of the previous century, and in the last quarter of the 18th century, when to a design by Pietro Paolo Ferrara the interior assumed its present appearance. The neo-Gothic facade was built in 1903-1904 and completed only in 1950.

The cathedral was elevated to the dignity of minor basilica by Pope Pius IX on December 10, 1848, while it has been an Italian national monument since January 18, 1941.

== History ==
=== The cathedral of Santa Maria del Parco ===
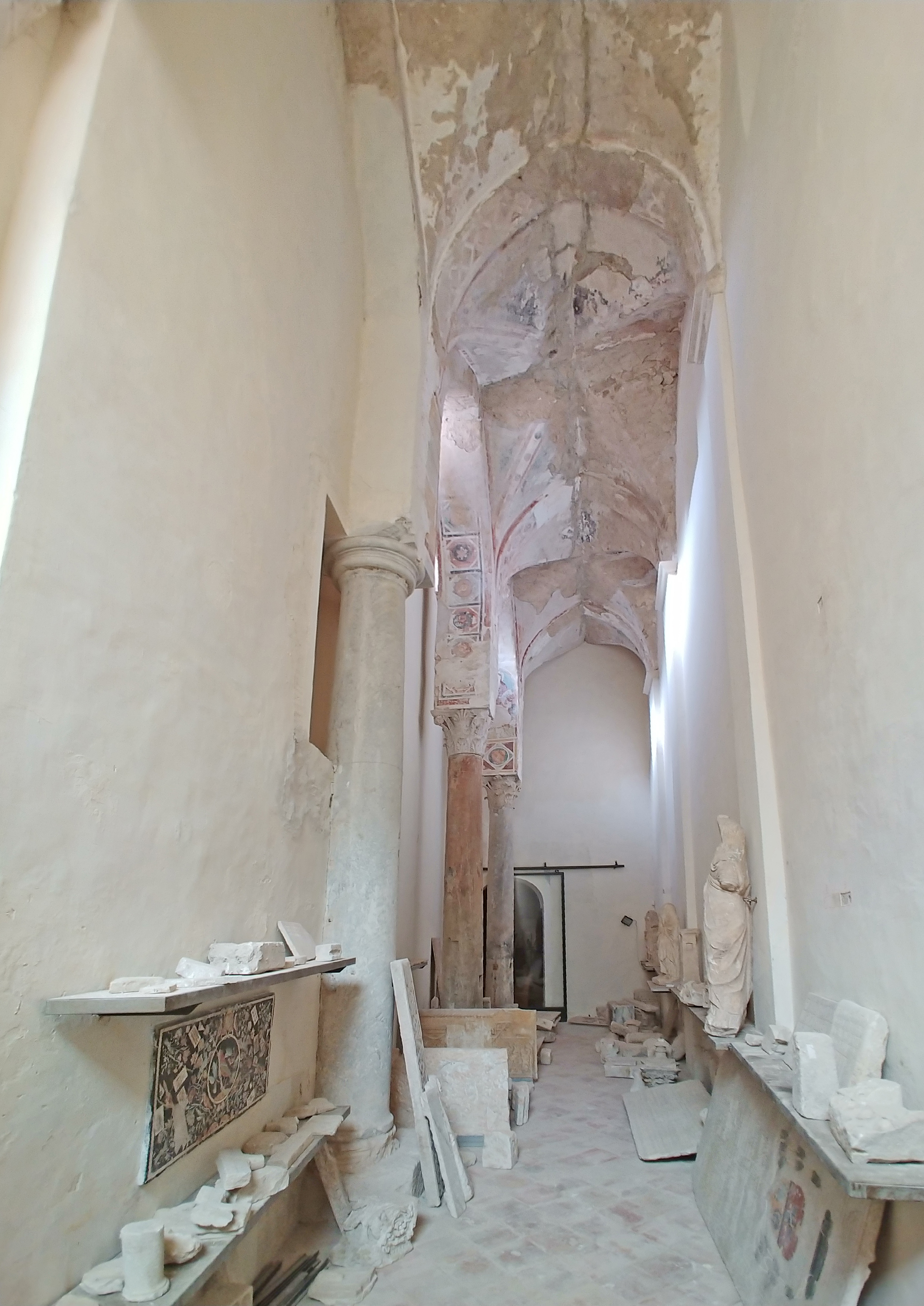
Interior of the seventh nave, left aisle of the first cathedral.

In ancient times, the city of Gaeta fell under the jurisdiction of the diocese of Formia, according to tradition founded by 487. Due to frequent Saracen raids, in the second half of the 8th century the bishopric was transferred to the safer city of Gaeta, joining its title to the Formian one starting in 787 with Bishop Campolo, which was permanently replaced from 867 with Bishop Rainulfo I.

The relics of St. Erasmus were brought to Gaeta in 842 by Bishop John III and placed in the pre-existing church of Santa Maria del Parco (probably the same church of Santa Maria extra portam mentioned in 831); this building probably already existed at the end of the 7th century, and owed its appellation (placed to indicate an enclosed area) to its inclusion within the second city wall, built between the end of the 8th century and the beginning of the following one. The episcopal complex stood in a terraced area facing the harbor, near the ducal palace, in a densely built-up area, and had incorporated two horrea from the late Republican period built to serve the harbor itself. Below the podium on which the cathedral and episcope stood were several basements owned by Docibilis II (later passed in 954 to his son Marinus II) that had direct access to the outside; in the one below the altar of St. Eupuria was a cell entrusted since 978 to the rector of the hermitage of St. Michael the Archangel on Mount Altino.

With the discovery of the remains of St. Erasmus made by Bishop Bono (917), the cult of the saint grew, so much so that he became the patron saint of the city, recorded from 995 as the co-dedicatory of the cathedral. For this reason, Hypatos John II of Gaeta (933–963) planned a series of works (probably started in 954) to give the martyr's relics a suitable location, purchasing a house contiguous to the cathedral to enlarge the church and build the new episcope. The cathedral gained further importance in 933 or 934 when Hypatos John, an imperial patrician and grandfather of John II, was buried there.

=== The cathedral in the 12th century ===
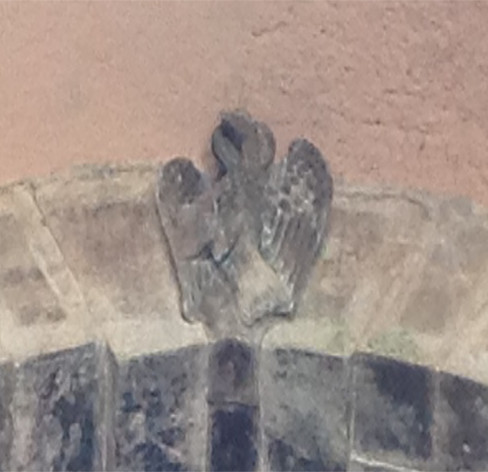
The keystone of the inner arch of the bell tower basement, with the inscription bearing the name of the designer: Nicolangelo.

In 1003, Bishop Bernard, son of Marinus II, initiated the construction of the baptistery of St. John by purchasing a house located near the cathedral and thus beginning the “process of monumentalization of the northern front of the episcopal complex,” probably consisting of a series of staircases and loggias; the designer of the baptistery was possibly Stefano, mentioned in a document of Bishop Leo IV in 1052; the same document describes the monumental access to the complex from the portico side, which took place with a double staircase: the one that led into the church and the one that, instead, through the underground vault reached the episcope.

Beginning with the reign of the Hypati John I (867–933) and his son Docibilis II (933–954), the church was enlarged, and again after 978, to be finally consecrated on January 22, 1106 by Pope Paschal II and dedicated to St. Mary of the Assumption and St. Erasmus, and probably also to St. Marcian and St. Probus; this had a three-aisled structure with access facing the sea and was the place where Pope Gelasius II was consecrated on March 10, 1118.

In 1148 construction of the tall bell tower began on a design by Nicolangelo, a Roman, on land specially donated by the monk Pandolfo Pelagrosio. Work continued until 1180, reaching the top of the quadrangular tower. The apical dome with an octagonal base was added only in 1279 during the episcopate of Bartolomeo Maltacea.

=== The present cathedral ===
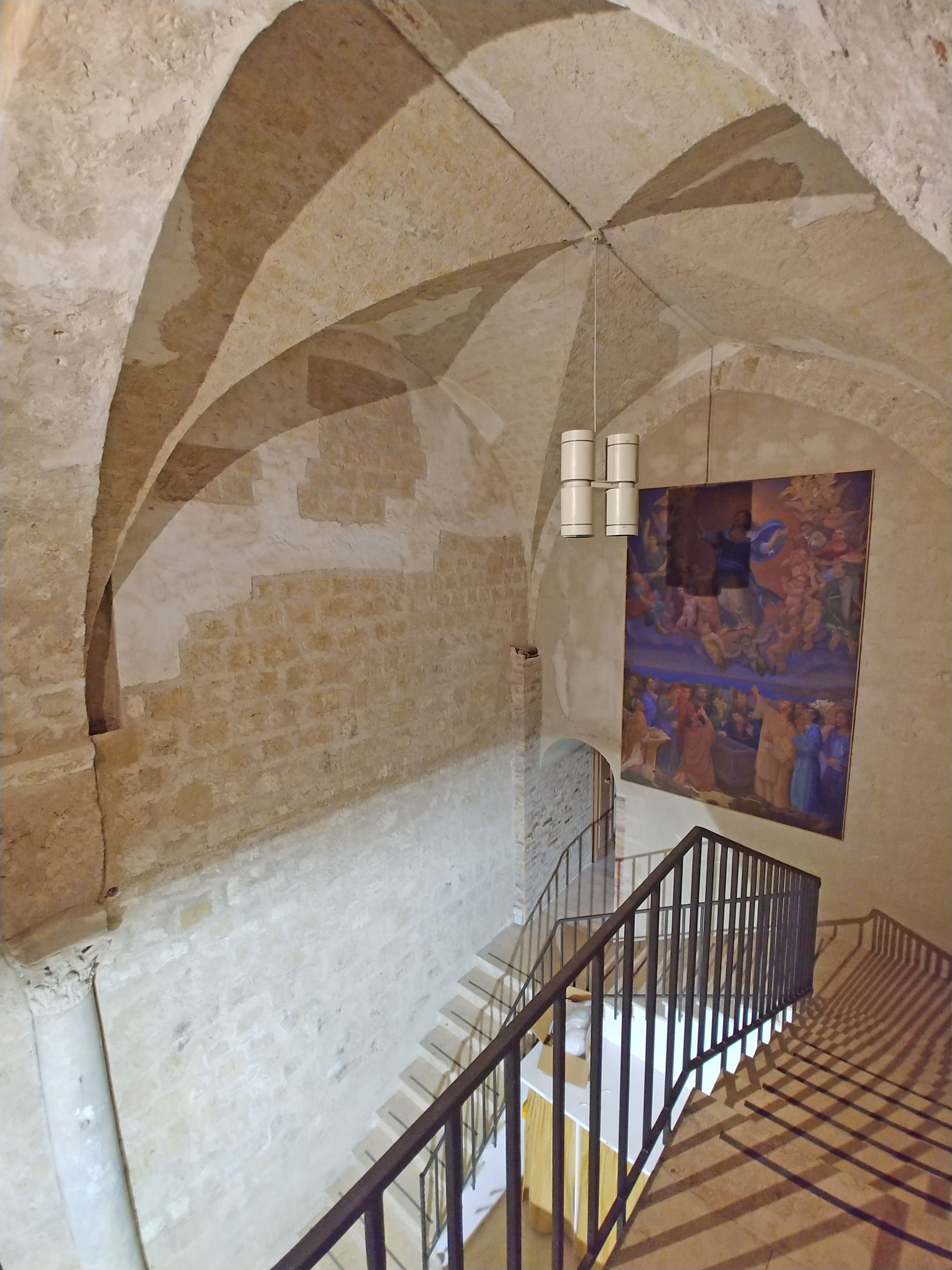
The first bay of the outer western aisle of the Gothic cathedral.

In the 13th century, the cathedral was rebuilt with the opposite orientation to the original one, and a wider structure with seven aisles divided by thirty-six columns to which, over the centuries, others of smaller section were added to better support the structure; the left aisle of the first cathedral, although not in axis with the others, went to form the first right aisle of the new church. Regarding the unique layout of the building there are two main theses:

- the first considers the seven-aisled structure all built ex novo by 1256 following the powerful earthquake of June 1, 1213 by incorporating the 11th-century cathedral, and justifies the anomalous number of aisles as a workaround, through the multiplication of the number of aisles, to the impossibility of multiplying the number of bays due to the presence of pre-existing buildings and streets;
- the second, which draws on cases such as that of the cathedral of St. Andrew and the adjoining basilica of the Crucifix in Amalfi, sees it as the result of the union of two pre-existing buildings of worship of three aisles each (the 11th-century cathedral and a church parallel to it), joined after 1255 by means of an additional, purpose-built nave that would go on to form the central nave of the new cathedral.

Throughout the 13th century the building was enriched with valuable artifacts, including the column of the Easter candle and a pulpit; in 1303, on the occasion of the millennium of the death of St. Erasmus, a precious silver statue depicting the patron saint was commissioned. It is probable that the earthquake of the central-southern Apennines in 1349 also damaged the cathedral of Gaeta, and that the decorative pictorial campaign of the late 14th century - to which the pieces of frescoes visible in the seventh nave bear witness - can be traced back to the restorations following that earthquake.

In the 15th and 16th centuries, the interior decoration of the church underwent some changes: the layout of the chancel was modified and a carved wooden choir was installed, as well as a first pipe organ of modest size.

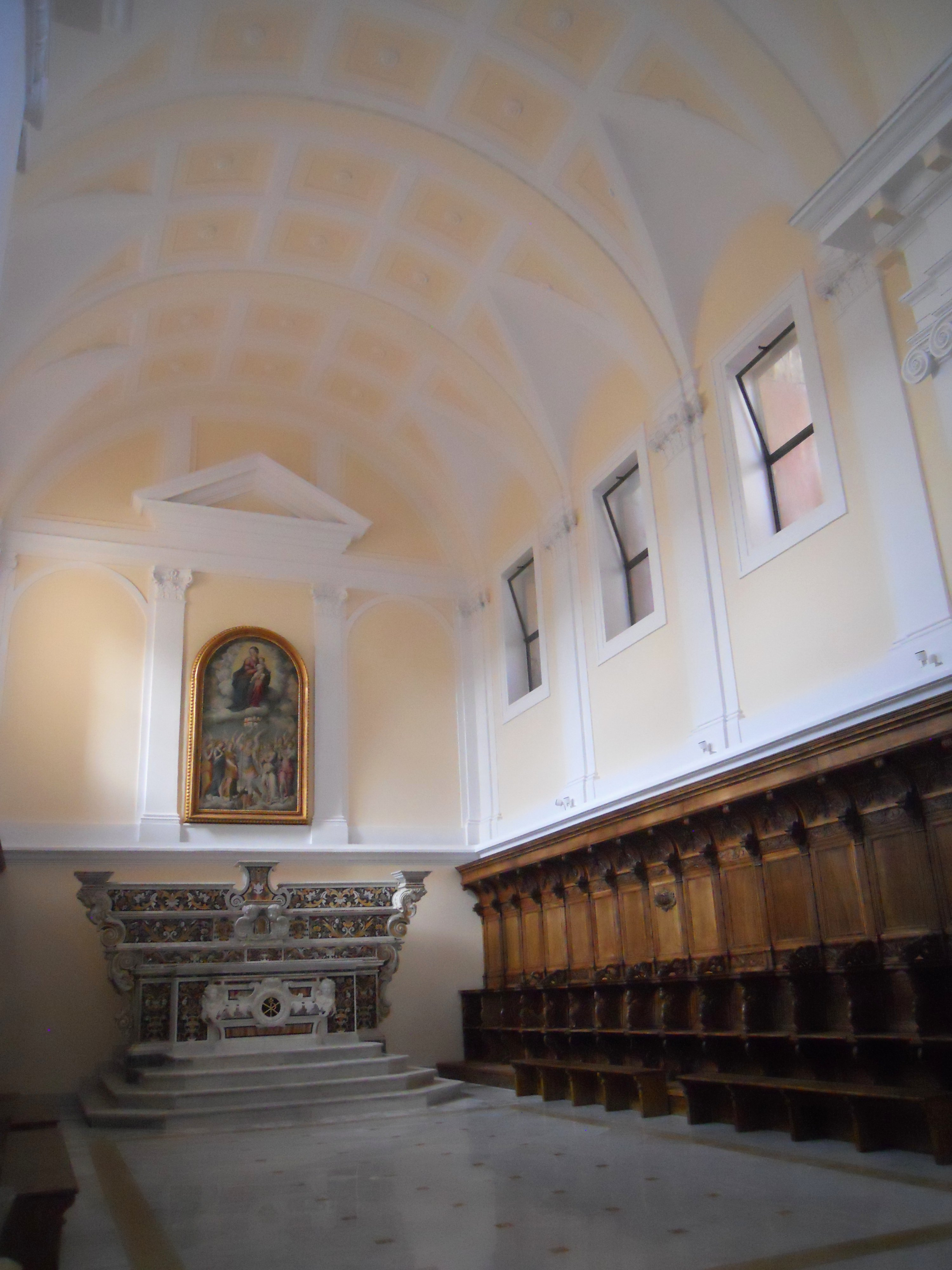
The Baroque apse (17th century, finished in 1737 with the construction of the vault) in its present arrangement, with the high altar by Dionisio Lazzari (1683).

As early as 1543, Bishop Antonio Lunello had decided to work on the apsidal area of the cathedral by enlarging it to the structures that had been built on the site of the ancient baptistery; however, the presence of the altar of the Holy Cross (placed to the left of the major one, which held the venerated relics of St. Eupuria) and the main access to the episcope, which was formed by the medieval subportico, delayed the work, which was probably never undertaken. The idea was taken up in 1569 by Antonio Lunello's nephew and successor, Pedro, but due to a dispute with the civic magistrate (who had exclusive patronage of the apse) it could not begin until 1584. The new apse, conforming to the dictates of the Council of Trent and adapted to the increased number of canons, was finished and consecrated in 1597, while the underlying crypt was only completed in 1607; at that juncture the two sacristies were also built. In 1617 to raise the vault of the crypt the latter was, together with the apse, the subject of a radical interior makeover by Jacopo Lazzari, who was succeeded in 1644 by his son Dionisio, who in the 1680s was responsible for the construction of a new high altar in polychrome marble; it was not placed close to the back wall, but under the apsidal arch, while at the end of the apse there was a pipe organ on a special chancel, probably a duplicate of the one in the sanctuary of the Santissima Annunziata (built by Giuseppe de Martino in 1685-1689 and enlarged in 1737). Due to a lack of funds, the apse was provisionally covered with a hooded vault; it was not until 1775 that a masonry barrel vault was built, albeit lower than in the original design.

In 1725, the cathedral was also the seat of the parish of Santa Maria Assunta (which had a population of 310 and had been united in the 16th century with that of San Salvatore by Bishop Cardinal Tommaso De Vio) and the only baptismal font within Gaeta's city walls (corresponding to the present medieval old town) at which the various parish priests came to administer the sacrament of Baptism; in addition, there was a chapter consisting of an archpriest, an archdeacon, two primiceri, seventeen canons, eight hebdomadaries, and other clerics.

Beginning in 1788, at the behest of Ferdinand IV of Bourbon, the cathedral underwent a radical renovation designed by Pietro Paolo Ferrara: he did not demolish the old Gothic structure, but incorporated it within a neoclassical-style appearance; the floor plan was reduced from seven to three naves with side chapels, and the nave was covered with a coffered barrel vault, while the two side naves were covered with small domes. The renovated church was reconsecrated and opened for worship on May 28, 1793, by Bishop Gennaro Clemente Francone.

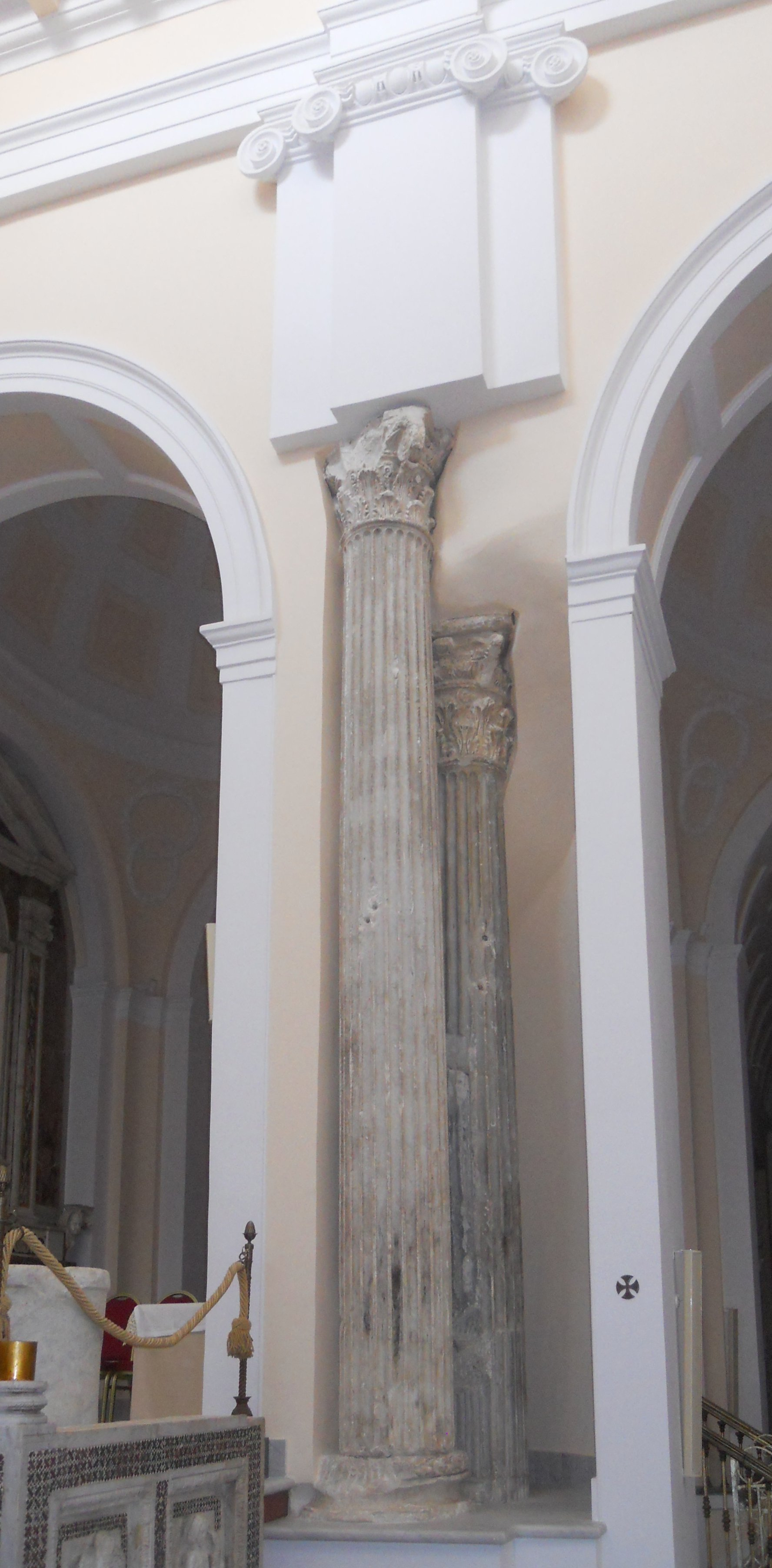
Some ancient columns incorporated into the neoclassical superstructure built between 1788 and 1793 by Pietro Paolo Ferrara.

In the 19th century the interior of the building underwent some changes: in 1810, following the suppression of religious orders ordered by Joachim Murat (1809), it welcomed two Baroque altars coming from the church of St. Catherine of Alexandria; in 1828 the balustrades of the side chapels and a double flight of steps connecting the presbytery and nave were made by Bishop Luigi Maria Parisio, who in 1845 wanted the chapter house to be rebuilt and used as a sacristy.

With the bull In Sublimi of 31 December 1848, Pope Pius IX, exiled in Gaeta, elevated the diocese to the rank of archdiocese; he himself visited and officiated several times in the cathedral during his stay in the city (1848–1849) and again in April 1850 on his return journey from Portici to Rome, and donated some liturgical furnishings to it that are currently on display at the diocesan museum.

In the last months of the siege of Gaeta in 1860-1861 the church was hit by two shells (which fell in the sacristy and apse, respectively), which caused some damage that was repaired in the following years.

The facade, the result of the late 19th-century restorations, was very simple in form: it consisted of a plain-plastered wall having a flat crowning, in which there were three lunette windows, the central one at the top corresponding to the vault of the nave and the two side windows, lower down, where there are currently two small circular rose windows to provide light to the aisles; the façade was divided in half its height by a simple cornice and there was a single portal, surmounted by the inscription that remains in the same position and the marble eagle in relief now inside the church. In 1860 Archbishop Filippo Cammarota commissioned Giacomo Guarinelli, a major and commander of the Engineer Corps, as well as an architect who was also active in Gaeta in those years for the neo-Gothic renovation of the temple of St. Francis and the restoration of several churches, to design a new façade; Guarinelli devised an elevation in a neo-medieval style to match that of the bell tower, with a portico surmounted by an enclosed loggia within which a lapidarium would be set up. The project was never realized.

On January 22, 1903, on the occasion of the sixteenth centenary of the death of St. Erasmus, construction began on a new façade in the neo-Gothic style, designed by Pietro Giannattasio and with the advice of Canon Filippo Pimpinella, in the same manner as Guarinelli had proposed. Work stopped in 1904, with the lower part completed and the upper part lacking the two side wings and the rose window; it was not completed until 1950, and, in the rooms above the atrium and behind the choir loft, the Diocesan Museum was set up, opened in 1956 (as already planned in 1910 by the Superintendent of the Galleries of Latium), while originally they were to be used as an archive and chapter house. In 1935, on the occasion of the Eucharistic Congress that was to be held in Gaeta the following year, Archbishop Dionigi Casaroli had a polychrome marble floor made for the apse, bearing the prelate's coat of arms in the center. By Royal Decree No. 1746 of November 21, 1940, the cathedral was elevated to the dignity of an Italian national monument, effective the following January 18.

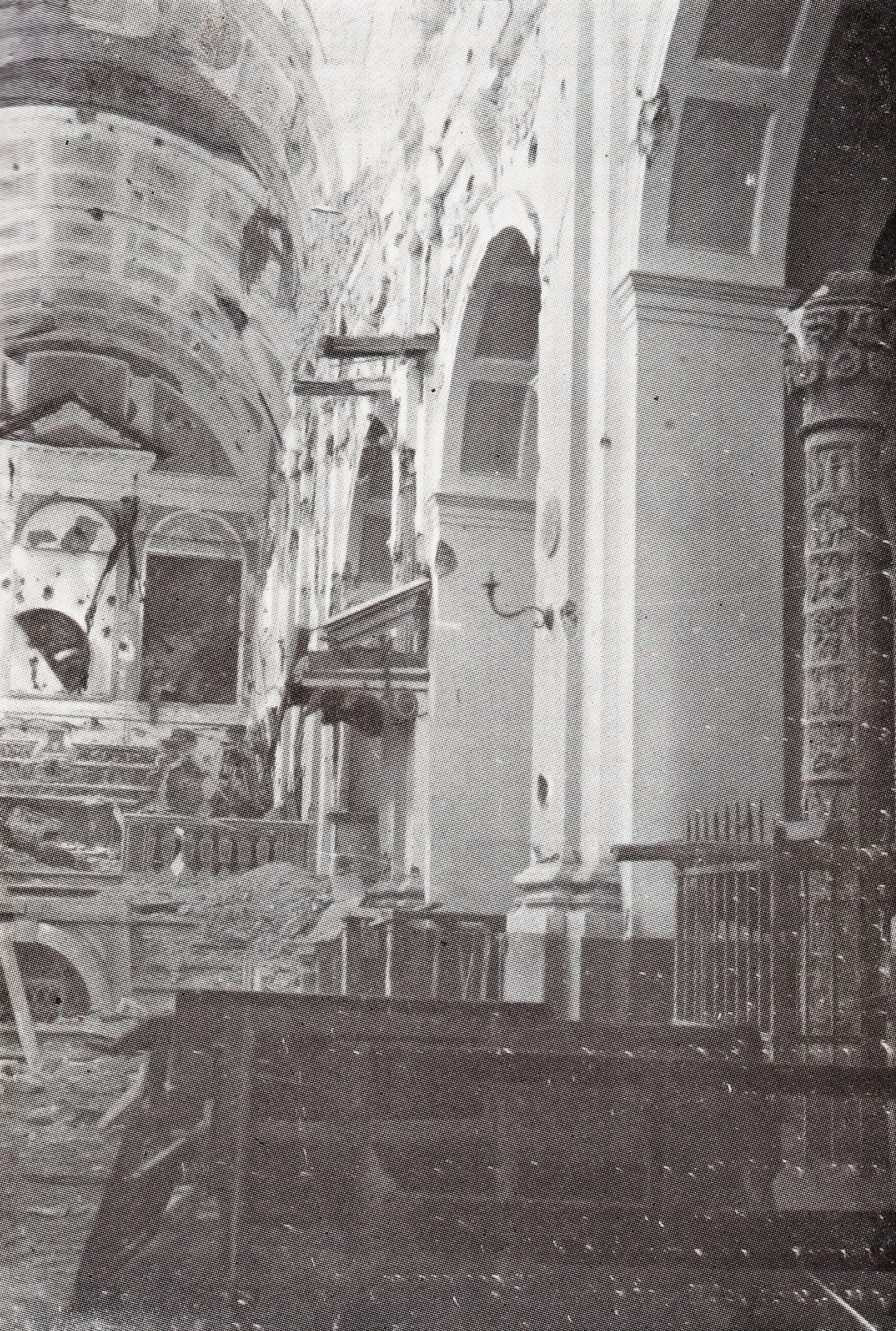
Interior of the cathedral after the bombing of September 8–9, 1943.

On the night between September 8 and 9, 1943, after the proclamation of the Armistice of Cassibile, the city of Gaeta was bombed by the German air force and a bomb hit the cathedral causing extensive damage: the roof of the nave and the pipe organ in the counterfaçade were destroyed, the floor of the apse and the Lepanto Standard, then displayed above the high altar, were heavily damaged. The repaired church was reopened for worship in 1950 after being reconsecrated by Archbishop Casaroli on November 23 of that year.

In the years immediately following the closing of the Second Vatican Council, the wooden cathedra - devoid of any particular decoration - was replaced with a high-backed upholstered chair that became the ordinary seat for non-bishop celebrants after the gift in 1972 of a new wooden seat in modern style and geometric workmanship, formerly the seat of the church of Santa Maria Assunta in Sperlonga. On the occasion of Pope John Paul II's visit to Gaeta (June 25, 1989), it was decided to endow the cathedral with a new cathedra, and Erasmo Vaudo was given the task; the seat was made of marble from Coreno Ausonio, reusing some medieval sculptural relics belonging to the cathedral (such as two stylophoric lions placed at the sides of the seat, a marble fragment with cosmatesque quincunx lacking the mosaic decoration with the function of a backrest, and above it the eagle already present on the 18th-century façade), and was inaugurated by the pope himself during the meeting with the diocesan clergy that took place inside the building.

On November 24, 2003, by a resolution of the municipality of Gaeta, which until then held the ownership, the cathedral was donated free of charge to the archdiocese, which became its owner.

Starting in 2008, the cathedral underwent a major renovation to restore and radically alter its interior appearance: some of the ancient columns placed in the pillars between the central nave and the side aisles were brought to light; a new flooring in polychrome marbles with elements in the Neo-Cosmatesque style was made; and the entire layout of the presbytery was reorganized using elements from various periods and characteristics, including some bas-relief carved tiles, previously in the former church of Santa Lucia, long considered to belong to the parapet of the cathedral's ancient pulpit and actually part of the plutei of that church. At the same time, the crypt underwent a conservative restoration, carried out between 2008 and 2010, both to its marble and fresco decorative apparatus. The cathedral was reopened for worship and reconsecrated by Archbishop Fabio Bernardo D'Onorio on September 27, 2014.

== Description ==
=== Exterior ===
==== Façade ====
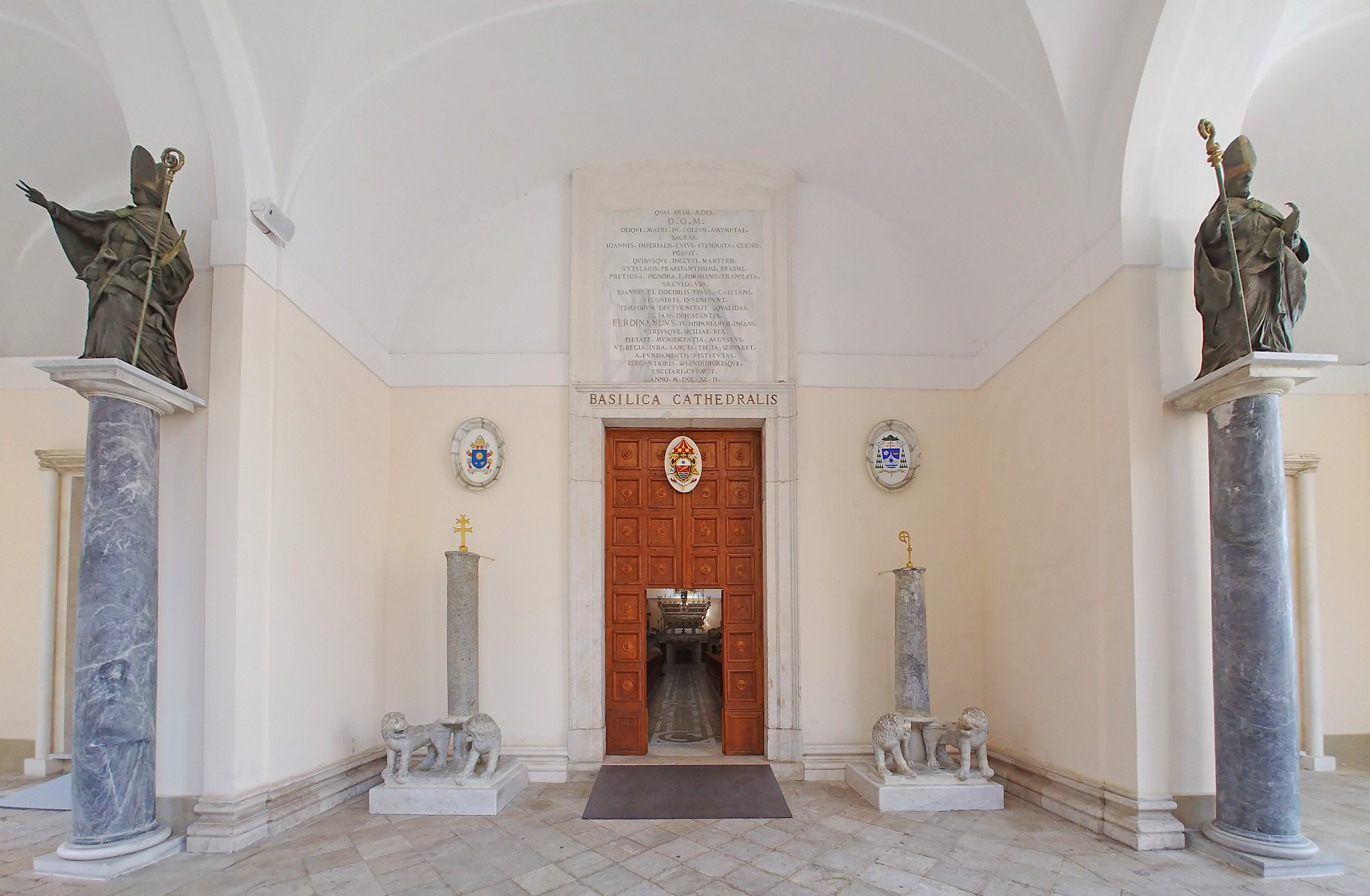
Interior of the central bay of the atrium.

The façade of the cathedral was built beginning in 1903 and completed in 1950 with the creation of the blind marble rose window. The project, carried out by engineer Pietro Giannattasio with the collaboration of canon Filippo Pimpinella, sought to reconcile neo-Gothic architecture with typical Romanesque elements taken from the bell tower, and the introduction of a narthex, of early Christian origin; the four angular pyramidal cusps, planned in the original design, were never built. The elevation, in red bricks with decorative elements in gray stone, faces the narrow Via Duomo, opened in 1852 along the axis of an earlier alley, and follows the internal division into three naves with as many bays.

An atrium covered with crosses is at the base, leading to the exterior with ogival arches resting on pillars; there is a portal at each of the naves. The main portal is surmounted by the 1792 inscription commemorating the restorations ordered by Ferdinand IV and is flanked by two columns resting on an ancient sculptural group depicting four stylophoric lions, which was divided into two halves during the 2008-2014 restorations. At the same time, the columns that originally supported the chancel were placed in the atrium, with silvered bronze processional statues of the patron saints above them, on the left St. Erasmus and on the right St. Marcianus, made by Erasmo Vaudo in 1984-1985 and already located inside the cathedral, first in the apse and then in the second side chapel on the right. Above the side portals, which were opened in 2008–2014, there are two coeval circular rose windows with marble frames that provide light to the smaller naves and replace the previous 18th-century lunette windows; the lintels of the aforementioned portals are made of the molded marble bases from the medieval period of the two sarcophagi located in the basement of the bell tower, which were removed as part of the post-war restoration that began in 1959.

In the upper part of the façade, there are three poliforas: in the center is a trifora and on either side are two biforas; below each of the corresponding columns, there is a marble inlay decoration depicting a cosmatesque quincunx. The central window is surmounted by a modern circular blind marble rose window. The elevation ends with a slender triangular spire surmounted by the cast-iron statue of the Immaculate Conception, made from a sketch by Ettore Ximenes and installed in 1904, on the occasion of the fiftieth anniversary of the proclamation of the dogma of the Immaculate Conception.

==== Bell tower ====
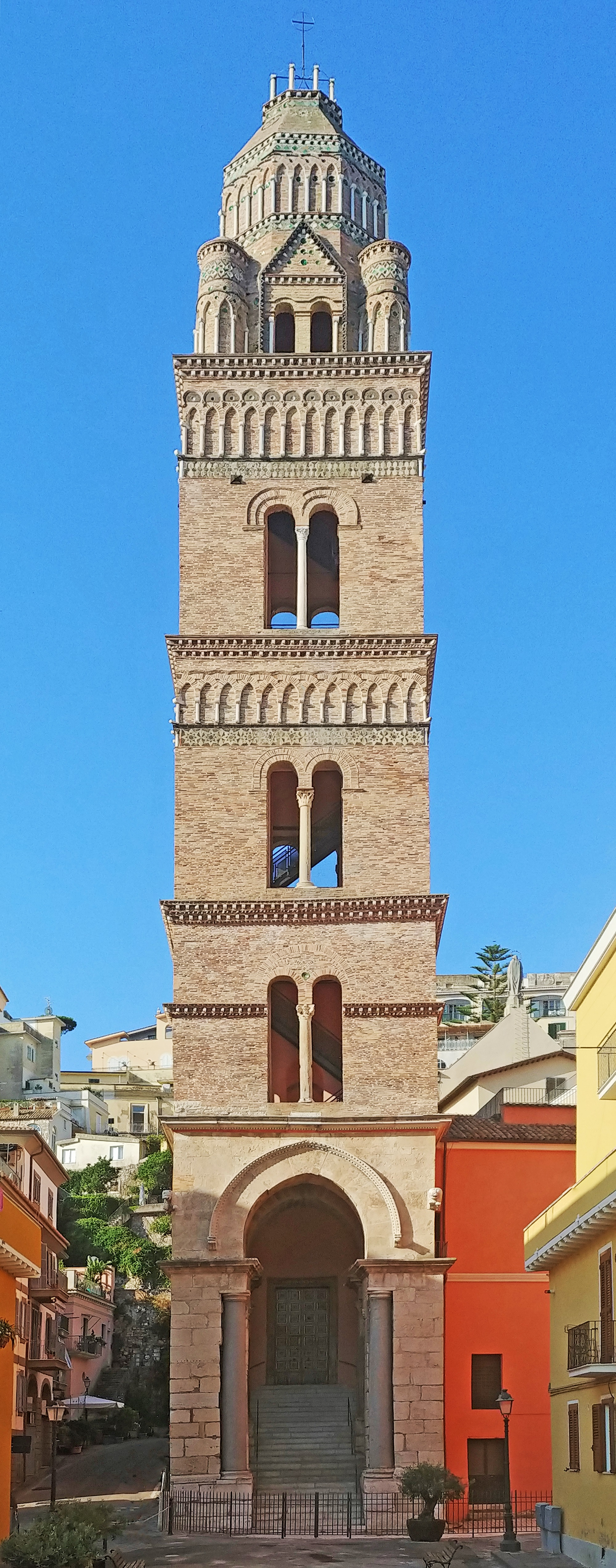
The bell tower.

The bell tower is located at the back of the cathedral, at the end of the hall, in axis with the ancient left aisle of the 11th-12th century cathedral.

The construction of the bell tower began in 1148 according to the design of the Roman magister Nicolangelo and ended in 1279 with the construction of the small dome; part of the outer facing of the mausoleum of Lucius Sempronius Atratinus, dating back to the 1st century B.C., whose name is partly legible on the left side, was also used for the construction of the high basement, whose wall face is made of stone blocks.

The basement is internally hollow: in the main façade of the bell tower, which faces the gulf, there is a large ogival arch supported by two Tuscan columns; this gives access to a room covered with a rib vault and entirely occupied by a staircase ending in a doorway, which constitutes a secondary entrance to the cathedral. Along the side walls, there are ancient sculptural elements, such as two strigilated Roman sarcophagi (mid-3rd century CE) and two bas-reliefs depicting the biblical episode of Jonah and the sea serpent (Jonah 2).

The bell tower is built in three orders divided by brick cornices with marble corbels, of cosmatesque derivation; there is a bifora on each of the sides, and the upper two are characterized by a peculiar decoration of Arab-Norman influence with interlaced ogival arches resting on marble columns. The top consists of an octagonal dome flanked by four smaller circular turrets; the entire complex is decorated with polychrome enamels and numerous painted ceramic basins, currently 20th-century copies of the four types of original 13th-15th century ornamentation. The central dome reaches 57 meters in height.

To the right of the bell tower, along the outer wall of the apse, there are some windows in neo-Romanesque style: mistakenly considered as the only remains of a possible baptistery present in that area and dedicated to St. John the Baptist, they date back to the 20th century and provide light to a room originally conceived with a staircase function.

Bell tower photos
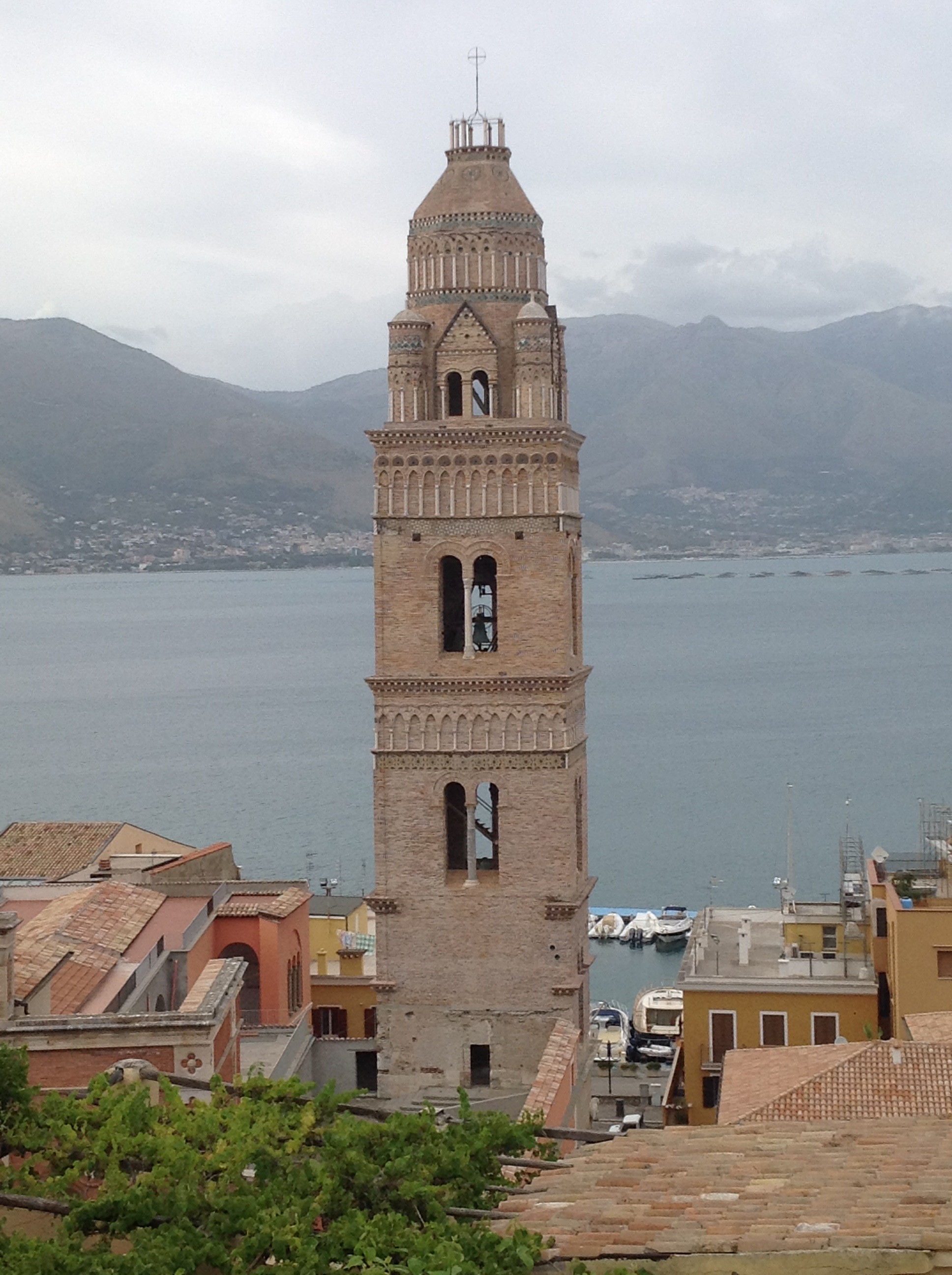
View from the south

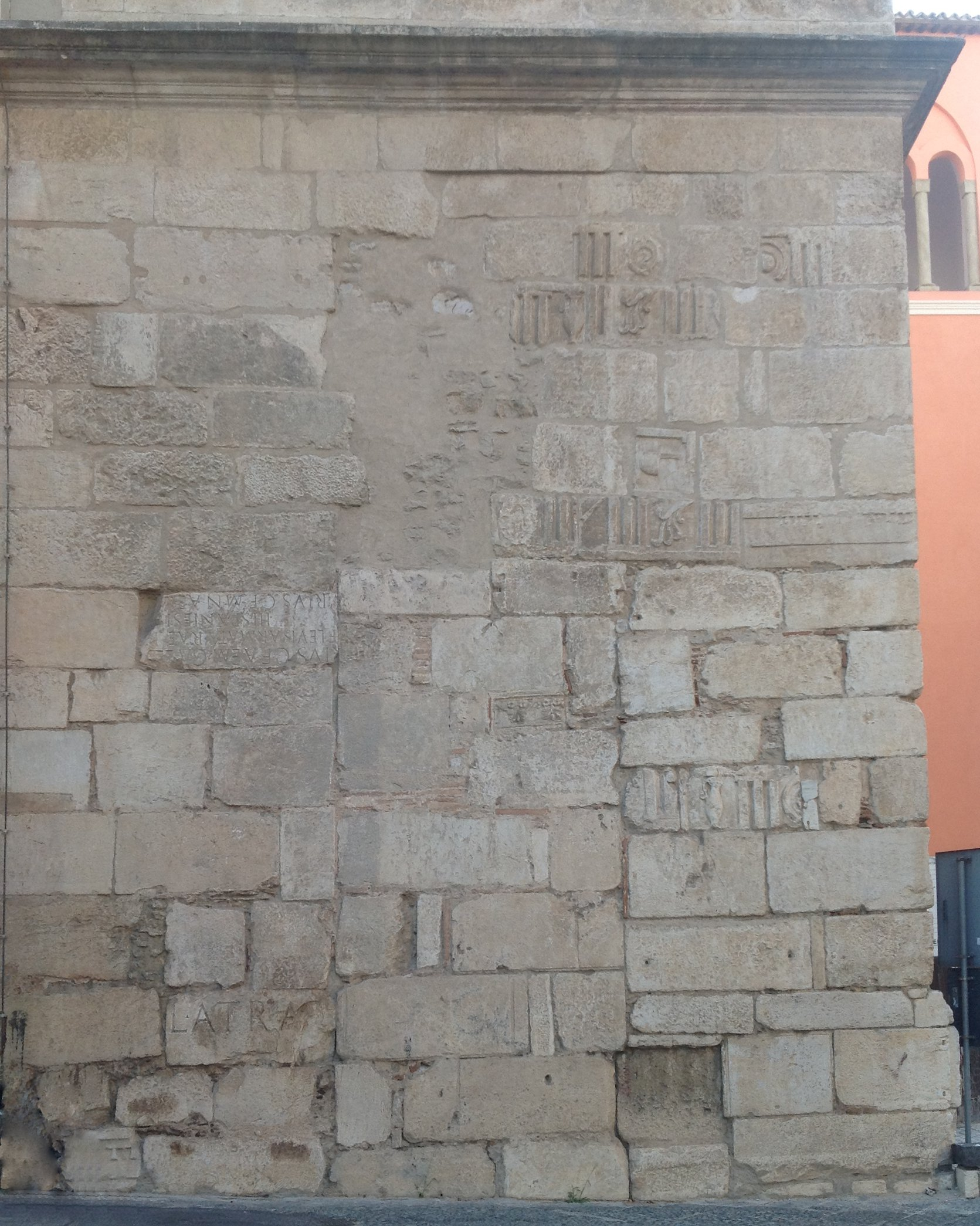
Left side of the basement

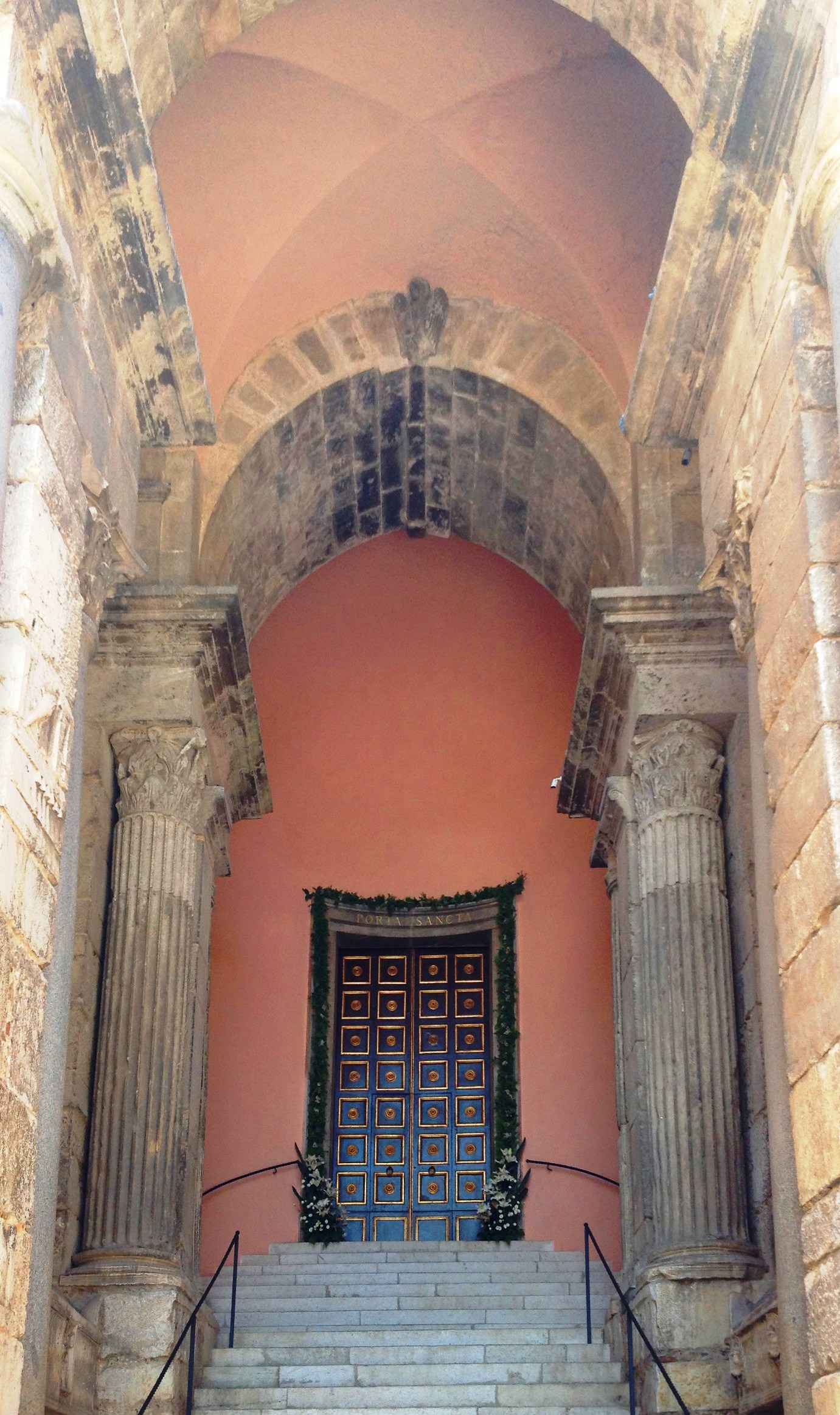
Interior of the basement

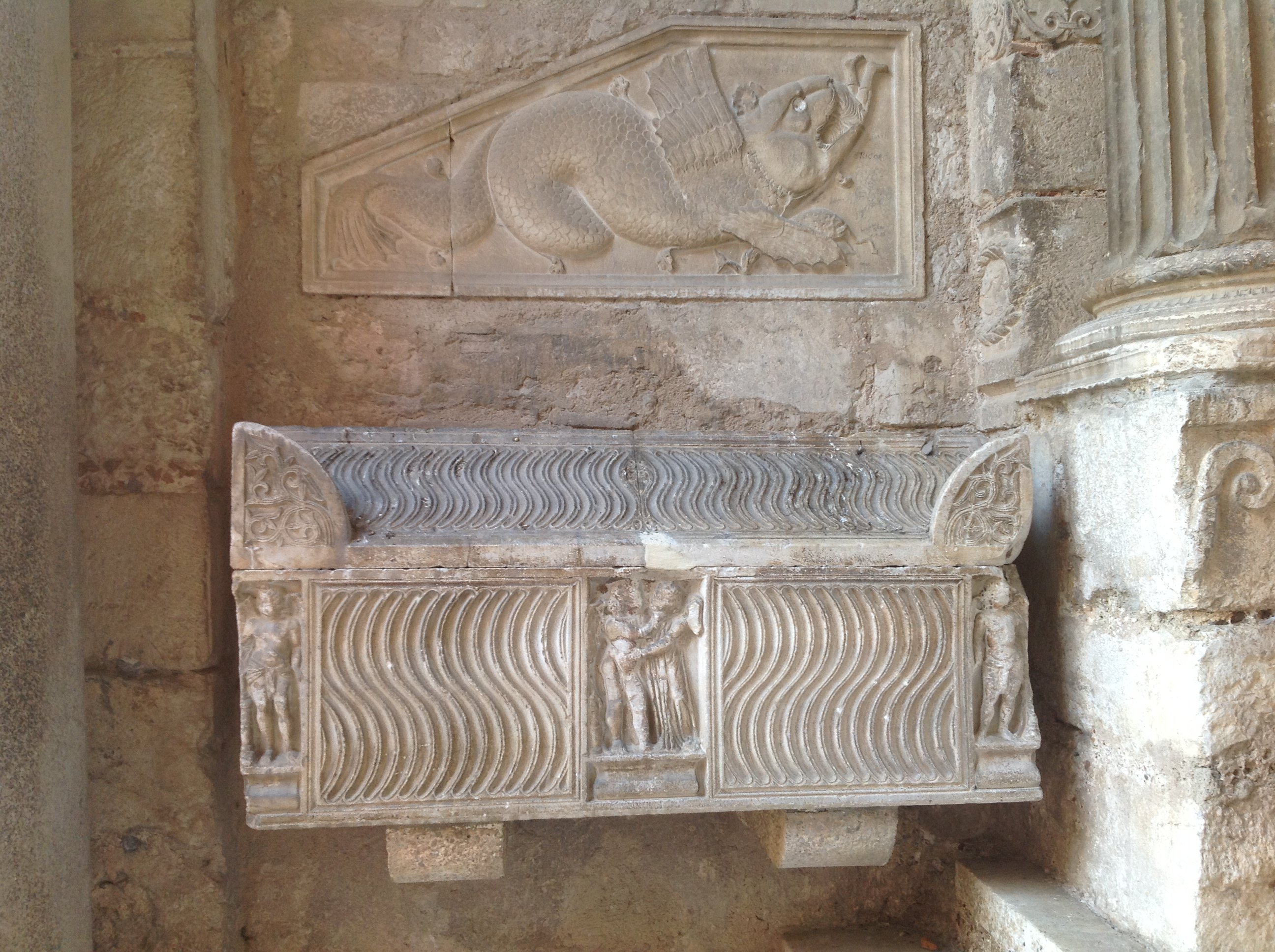
Sarcophagus and bas-relief on the left side

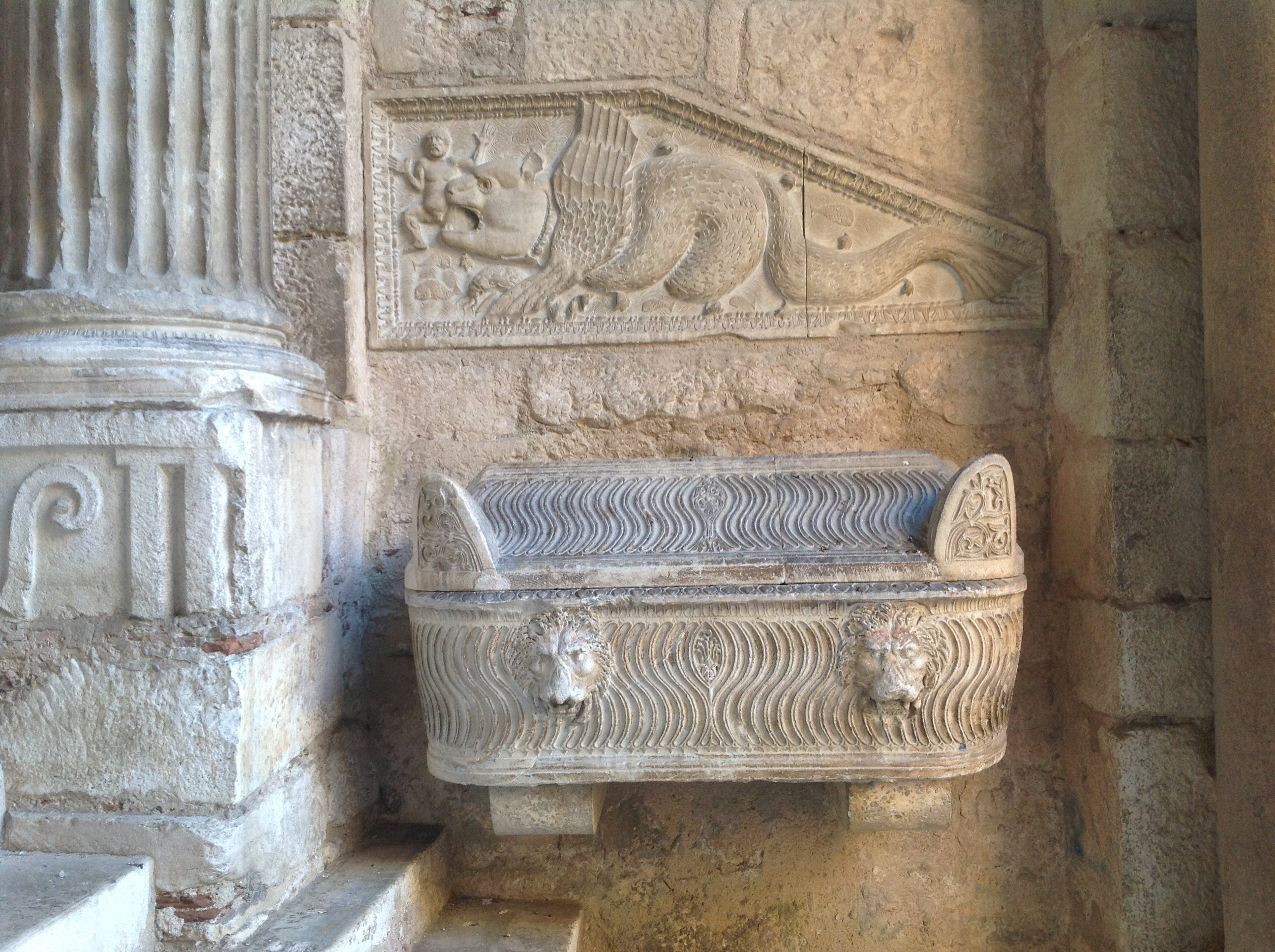
Sarcophagus and bas-relief on the right side

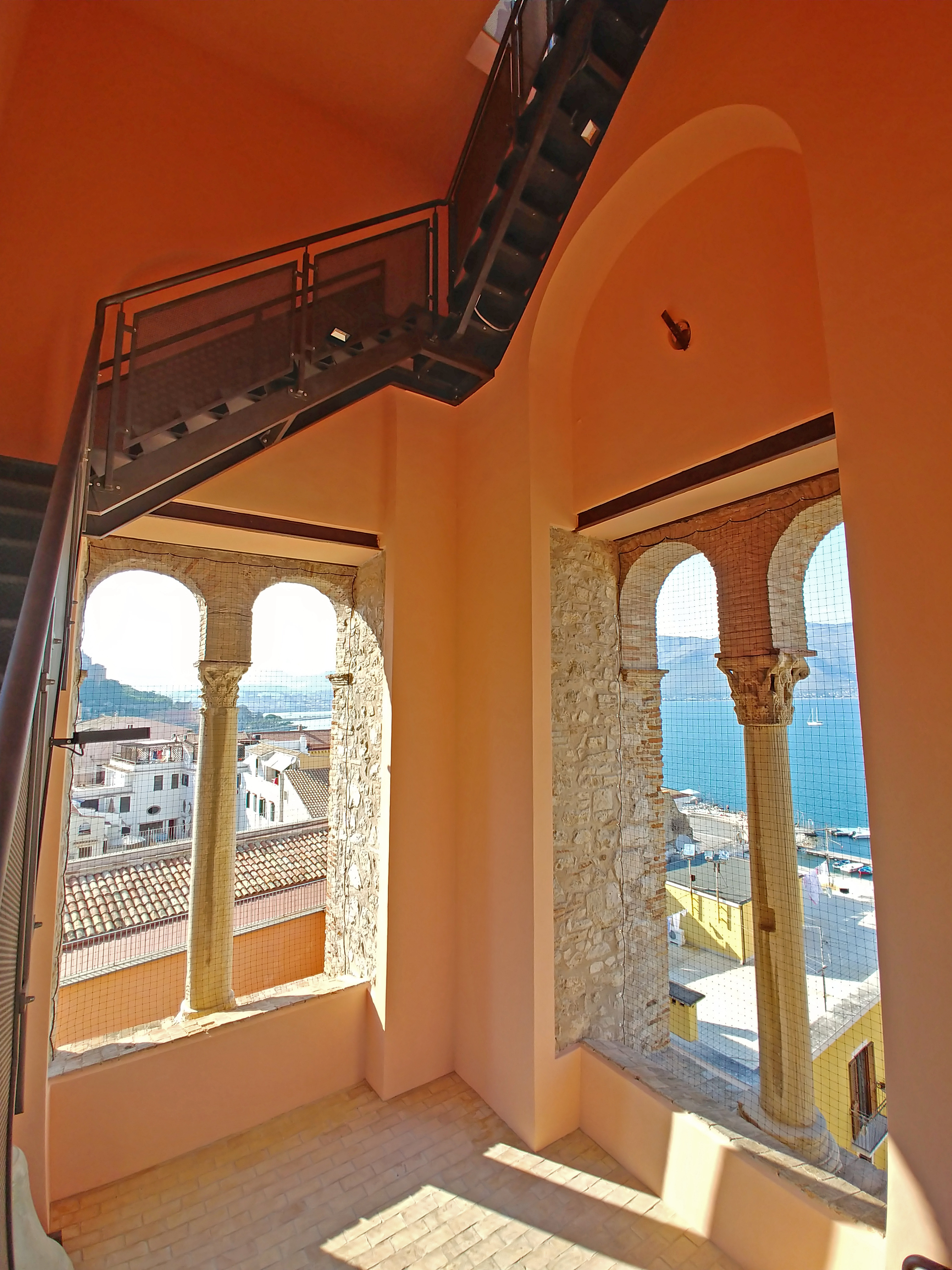
Interior of the second floor

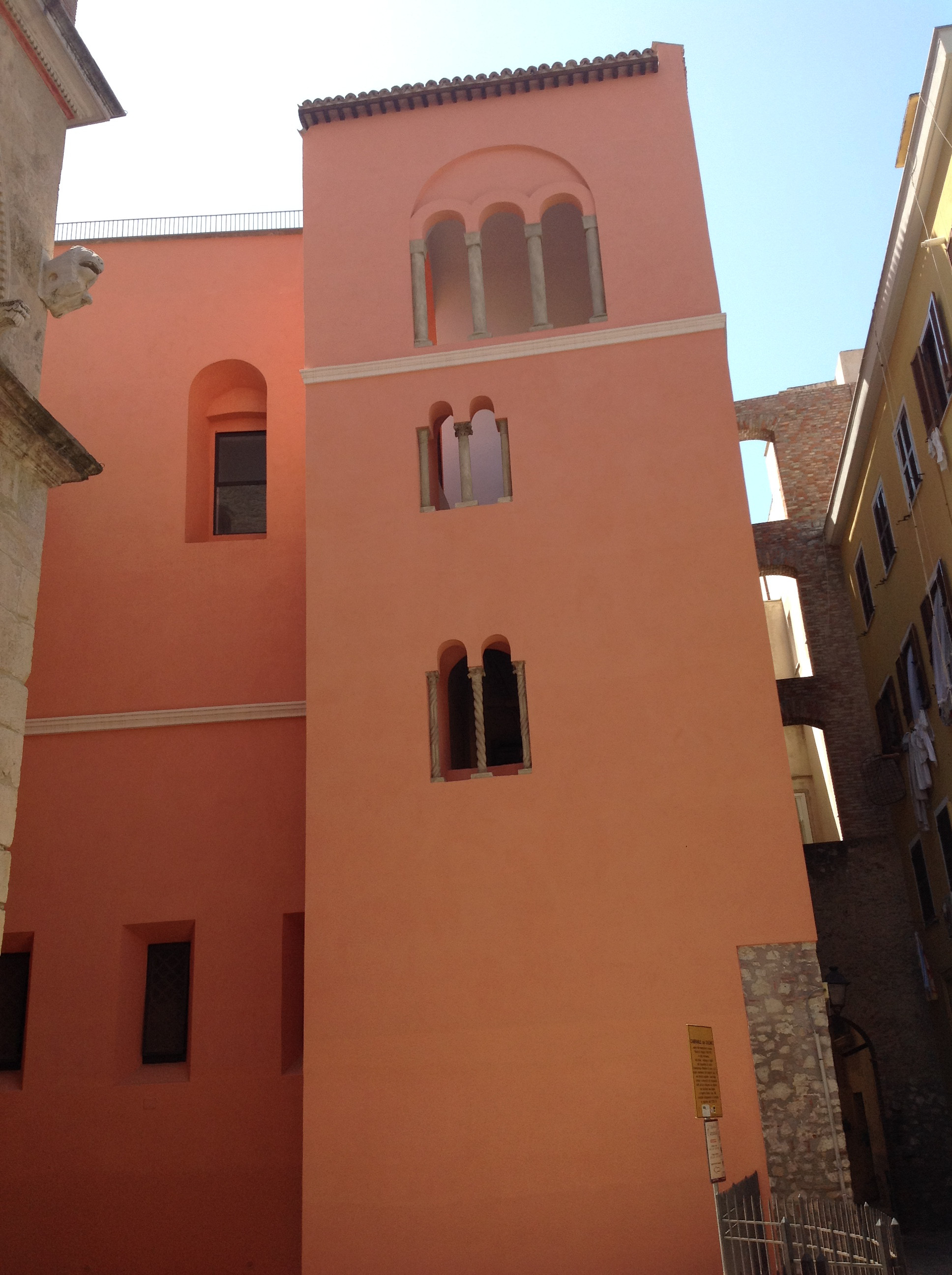
The staircase tower

=== Interior ===
The interior of the church owes its current layout to the 1788-1793 restorations carried out according to a design by Pietro Paolo Ferrara, who covered the ancient medieval seven-aisle structure with superstructures in the Neoclassical style.

==== Naves ====
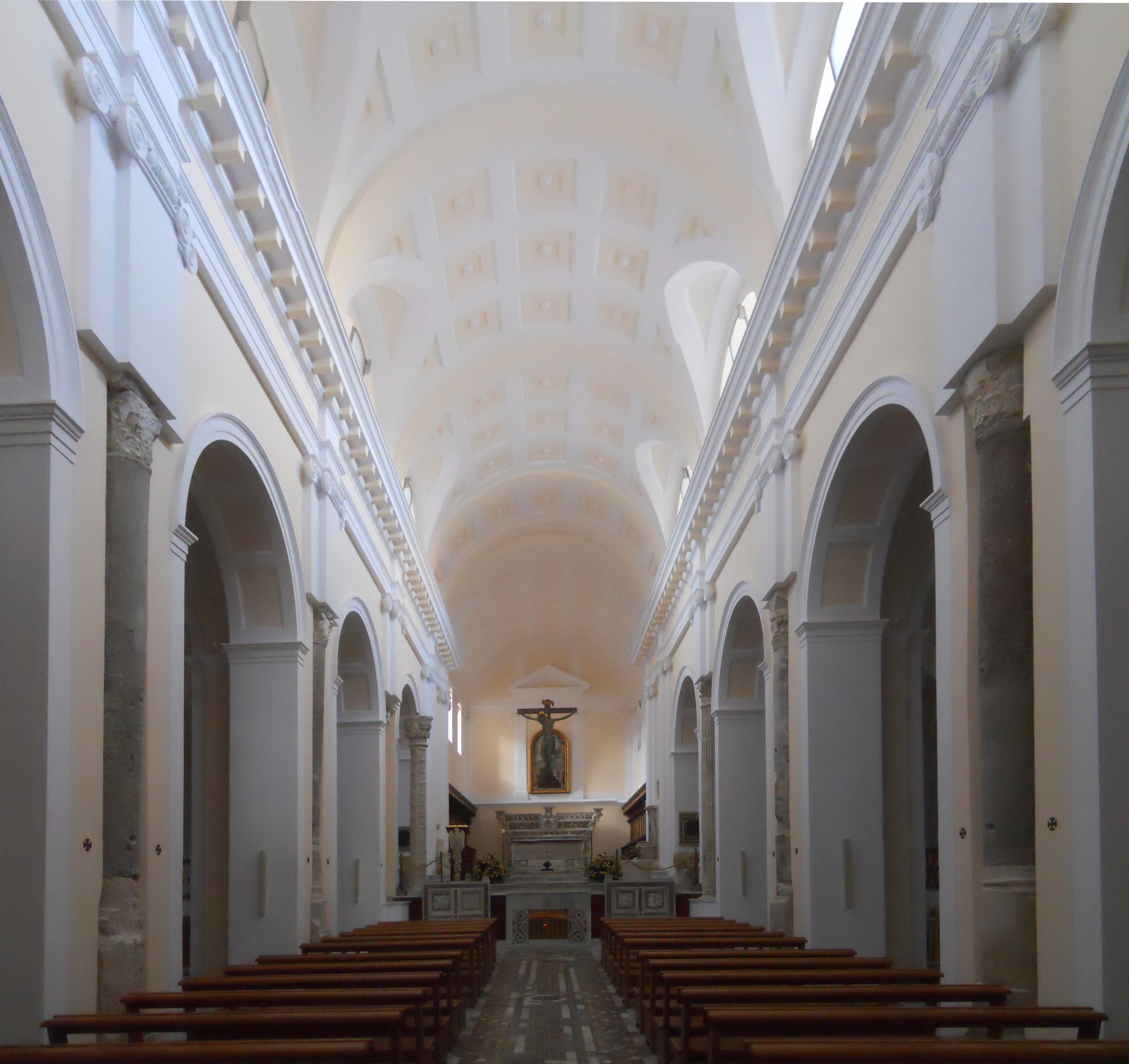
Interior.

The church has three aisles of four bays each; the central one is covered with a coffered lunette barrel vault and is separated from the two side aisles by round arches resting on pillars that incorporate, within them, the ancient columns (partly visible), and separated by smooth Ionic pilasters. Each bay of the side aisles is square and covered with a small dome, with no drum or lantern.

The counter façade of the nave is characterized by the presence of the main entrance portal, surmounted by the altarpiece, formerly on the back wall of the apse, Martyrdom of St. Erasmus by Carlo Saraceni (made in about 1610-1612 probably on commission from the Bishop of Gaeta Pedro de Oña, O. de M.); deeply damaged by the bombing of 1943 and subsequently subjected to a radical restoration, the work is one of the author's few large paintings, and for this reason it is characterized by a strong stylistic discontinuity between the lower part (very realistic and clearly inspired by Caravaggio) and the upper part (of academic derivation). Saraceni is said to have been inspired by the primitive altarpiece with a similar subject present at the time on the altar of St. Erasmus in the Vatican Basilica and coming from the Old St. Peter's Basilica (replaced in 1628–1629 with a new one by Nicolas Poussin), re-proposing the characters of the lost painting and reworking its composition. The scene is set outside a classical building on the terrace of which stands the emperor flanked by some men, probably the judges of the tribunal; in the foreground are the people witnessing the execution, depicted up to the bust, while in the center is the saint (whose robes and insignia are laid at his feet) lying on top of the wooden table to which he is tied, whose evisceration, carried out by two executioners, is depicted in a sharp and scientific manner; in the sky that forms the background are suspended in flight two putti bearing the palm and crown of martyrdom.

On either side of the portal are walled two ancient marble balustrades decorated in bas-relief (of which the one on the entrance to the right, with ornate intertwined wicker circles combined with crossed diagonals, comes from the church of San Domenico in Gaeta) and four epigraphs commemorating the visit of Pope John Paul II (June 25, 1989), the visits of other pontiffs to the city, the bishop and humanist Francesco Patrizi (in 1775) and the presence of Pius IX in Gaeta as well as the elevation by his will of the diocese to an archdiocese; the latter was commissioned to be sculpted by Archbishop Filippo Cammarota in 1857 and was part of a larger monument placed on the wall to the right of the doorway of the sacristy of the hebdomadaries. Higher up is the chancel, bordered by a marble balustrade, created during the 2008-2014 restorations by demolishing the 19th-century one (along with the 1980 Continiello pipe organ) in the rooms above the portico of the façade, resulting in the opening onto the church of the neo-Gothic trifora.

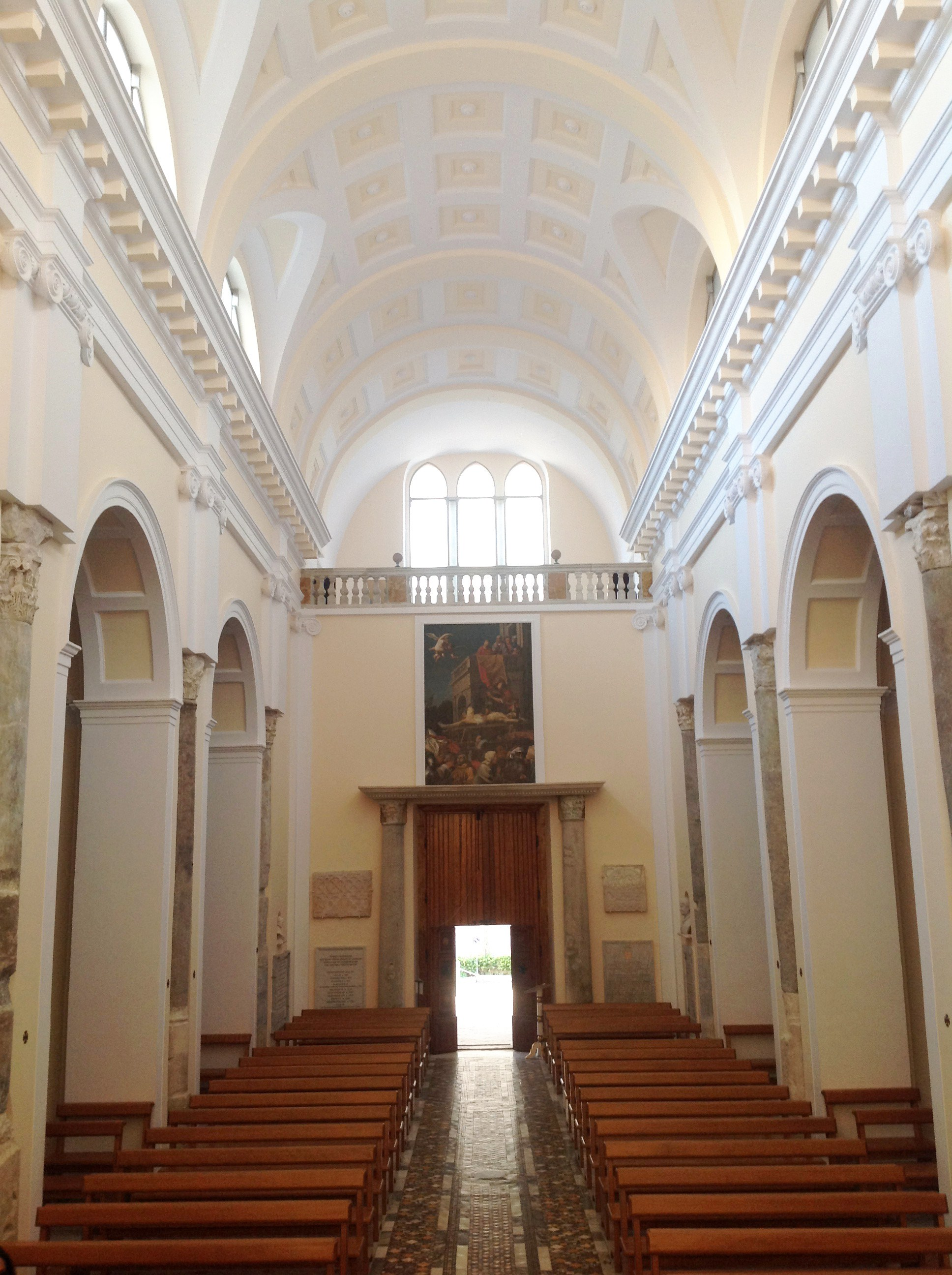
The nave toward the counterfaçade.

The floor of the hall and chapels, made of sawn white and yellow marble in imitation of the post-war one in the apse, dates from the 2008-2014 restorations, as does the neo-Cosmatesque-style fascia in the nave, which features a modern design with five spiral disks regularly arranged along the vertical axis (analogous to that of the late 12th-century church of San Pietro in Vinculis in Pisa) and a quincunx at the foot of the chancel, at the base of which is carved the signature of Franco Vitelli, who created the work.

The first bay of each of the two minor naves is introduced by a quadrangular, barrel-vaulted room, similar to those that connect the various bays. Before the 2008-2014 restorations, a 17th-century wooden crucifix donated by St. Alphonsus Maria de' Liguori (left aisle) and the 19th-century baptismal font with a painting from the first half of the 19th century depicting the Madonna and Child and St. John, by Luigi Stanziani, behind it (right aisle) were located there; the latter originally stood at the beginning of the left aisle and replaced a panel painting of the same subject, dating from the 16th century and traditionally attributed to Raphael Sanzio, which was sold in the early 20th century. Currently on the left are a marble stoup surmounted by a bas-relief with the Risen Christ and a detached fresco from the church of San Giovanni a Mare in Gaeta depicting St. Agatha (14th century), while the room at the top of the beginning of the right aisle has been turned into the tomb of the bishops and archbishops of Gaeta, with burials along the side walls.

Each of the two side aisles ends with a double flight of steps: the upward one leads to the presbytery, the downward one, on the other hand, to the crypt; in the fourth bay, raised above the others, an altar in polychrome marble finds its place: the one on the left, by Domenico Antonio Vaccaro, houses the polychrome wooden statue of the Immaculate Virgin (early 20th century); the one on the right, dating from 1828 and deprived of the mensa, the coeval wooden statue of St. Joseph and Sebastiano Conca's oil on copper painting Jesus Crucified between the Madonna, St. John the Evangelist and St. Mary Magdalene (1764), located within a marble frame above the tabletop, which recalls Luca Giordano's Jesus Crucified with the Three Marys and John the Evangelist (c. 1690–1692) placed on the left side altar of the nave of the sanctuary of the Santissima Annunziata in Gaeta.

The cathedral has no transept. However, at each of the fourth bays of the aisles a quadrangular ambulatory covered with a barrel vault leads outward, no deeper than the chapels. The one on the right ends with an arched niche surmounted by a triangular stucco tympanum and flanked by two marble columns with carved capitals, inside which is a processional wooden statue of the Virgin Mary; in the back wall of the left ambulatory, on the other hand, is the portal that gives access to the sacristy of the hebdomadaries, also flanked by two columns, on whose stucco lintel a carved marble one from the church of San Domenico in Gaeta (as are the carved sections of the door) dating from medieval times has been installed.

Nave photos
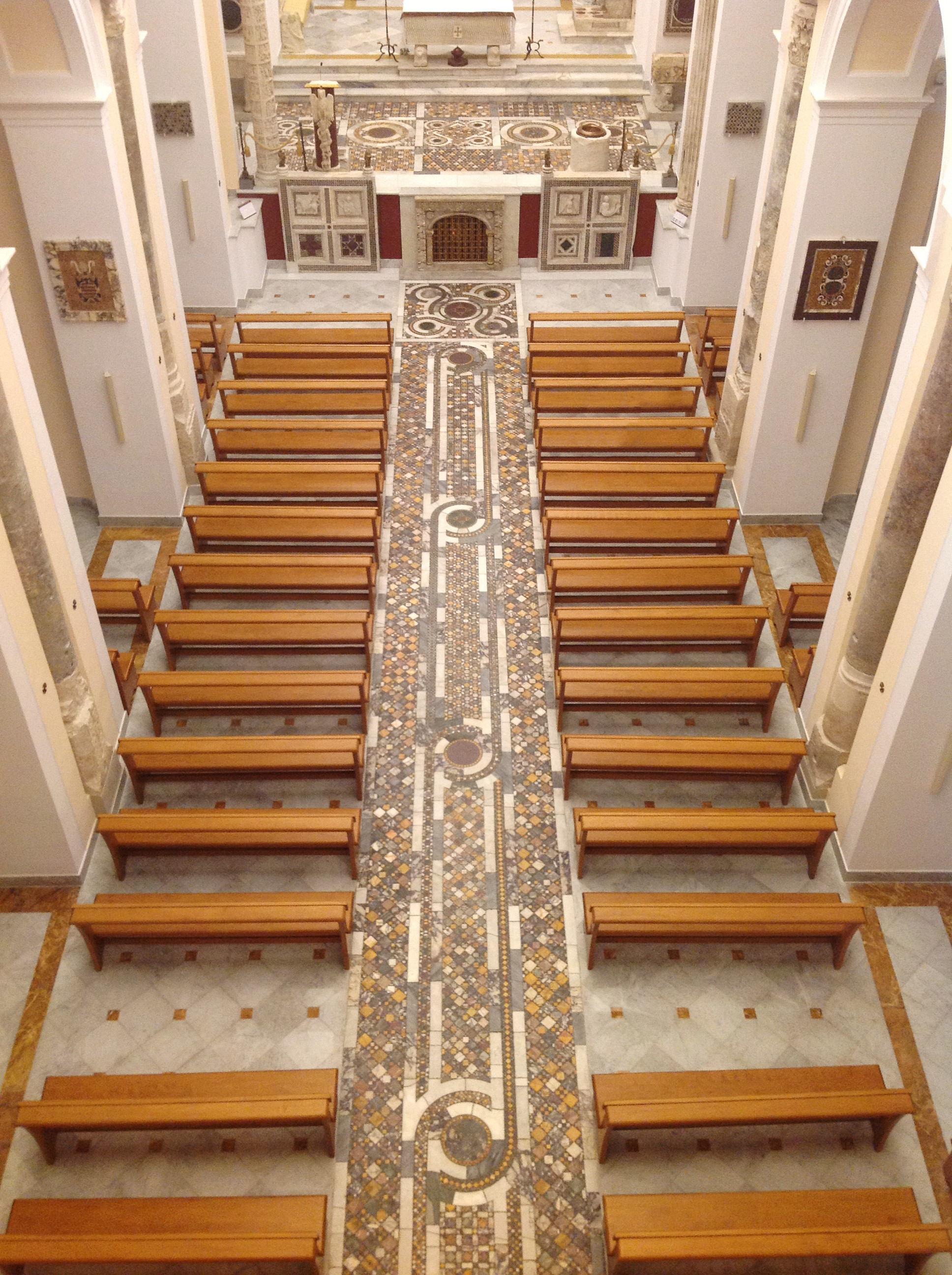
Floor of the nave

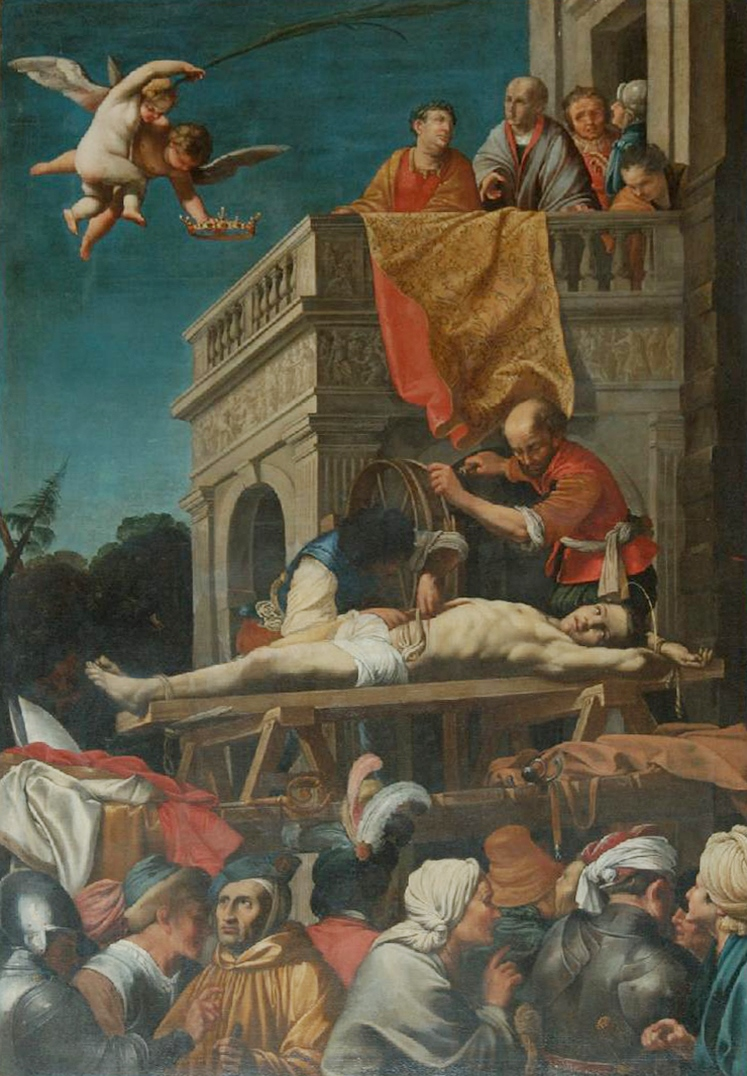
Martyrdom of St. Erasmus by Carlo Saraceni

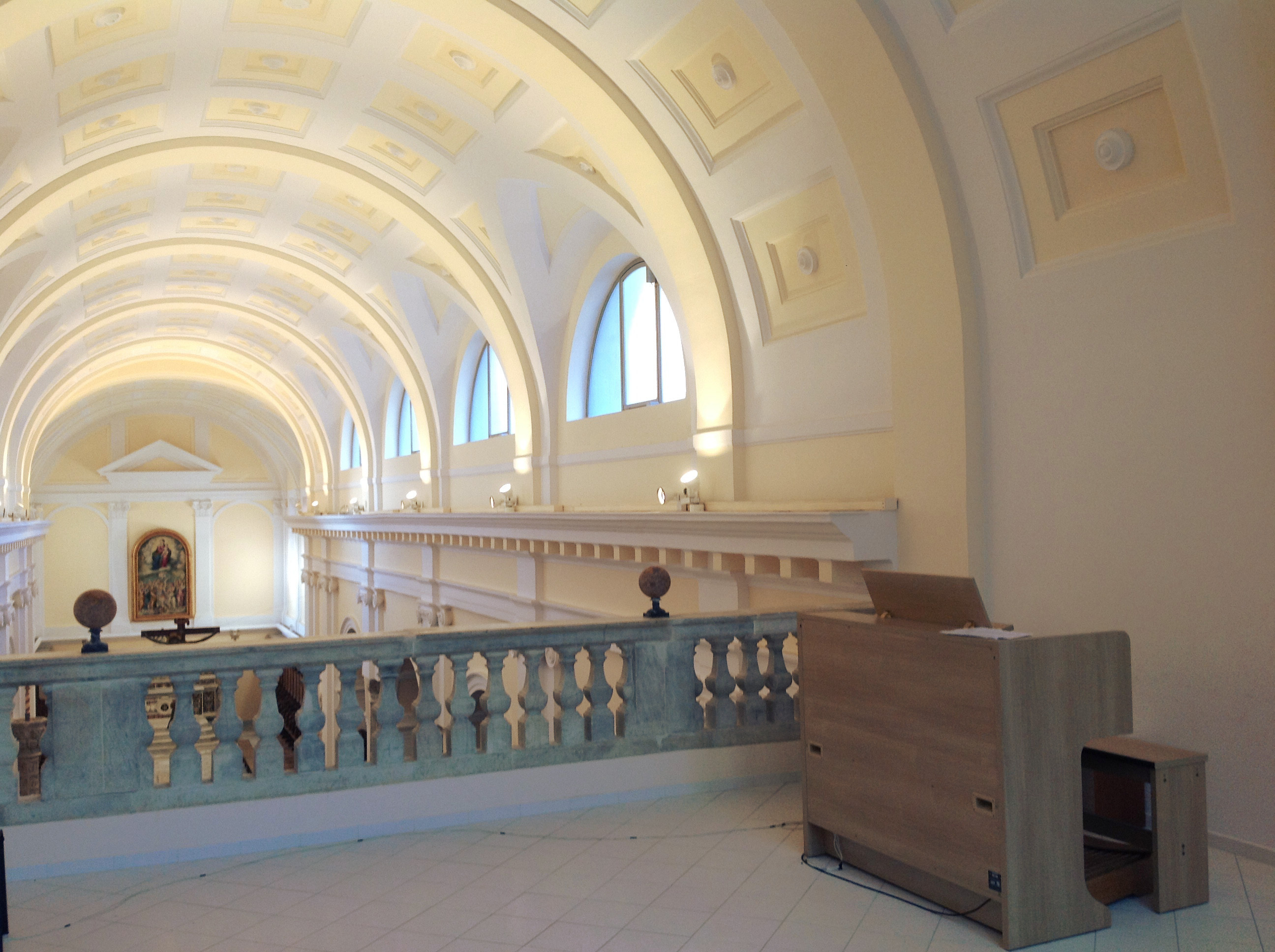
Choir loft and vault of the nave

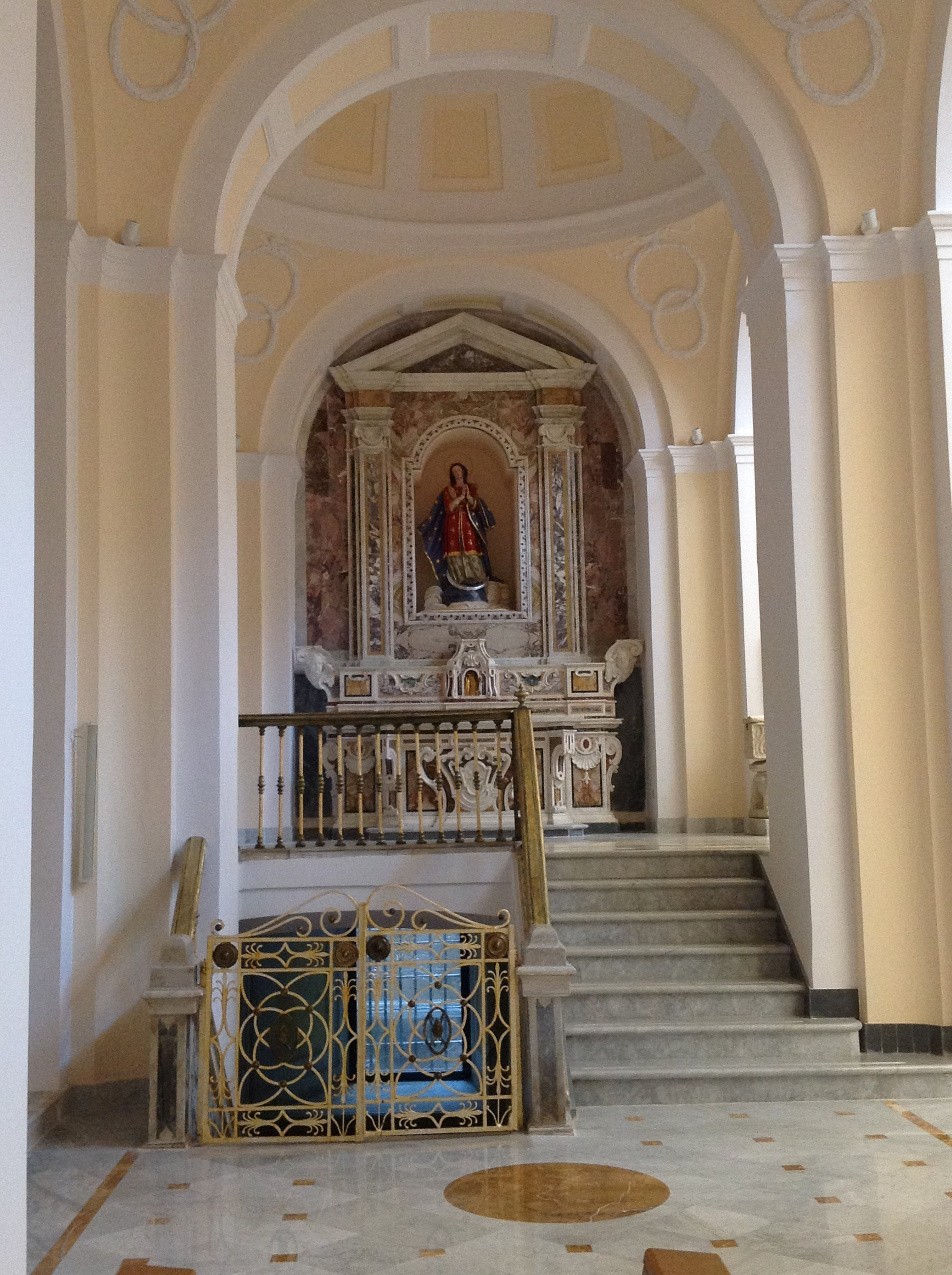
Left side aisle and altar of the Immaculate Conception

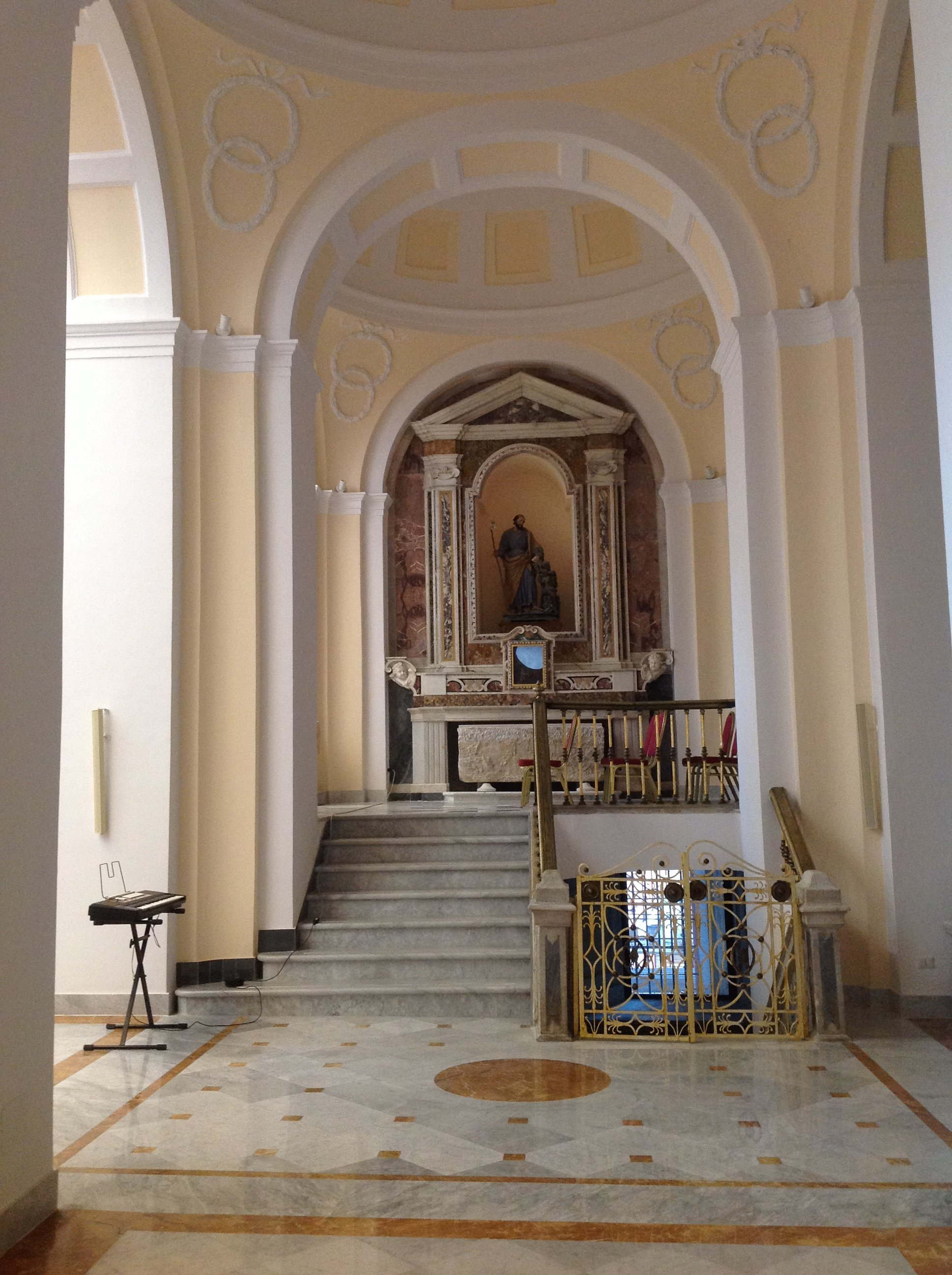
Right side aisle and altar of St. Joseph

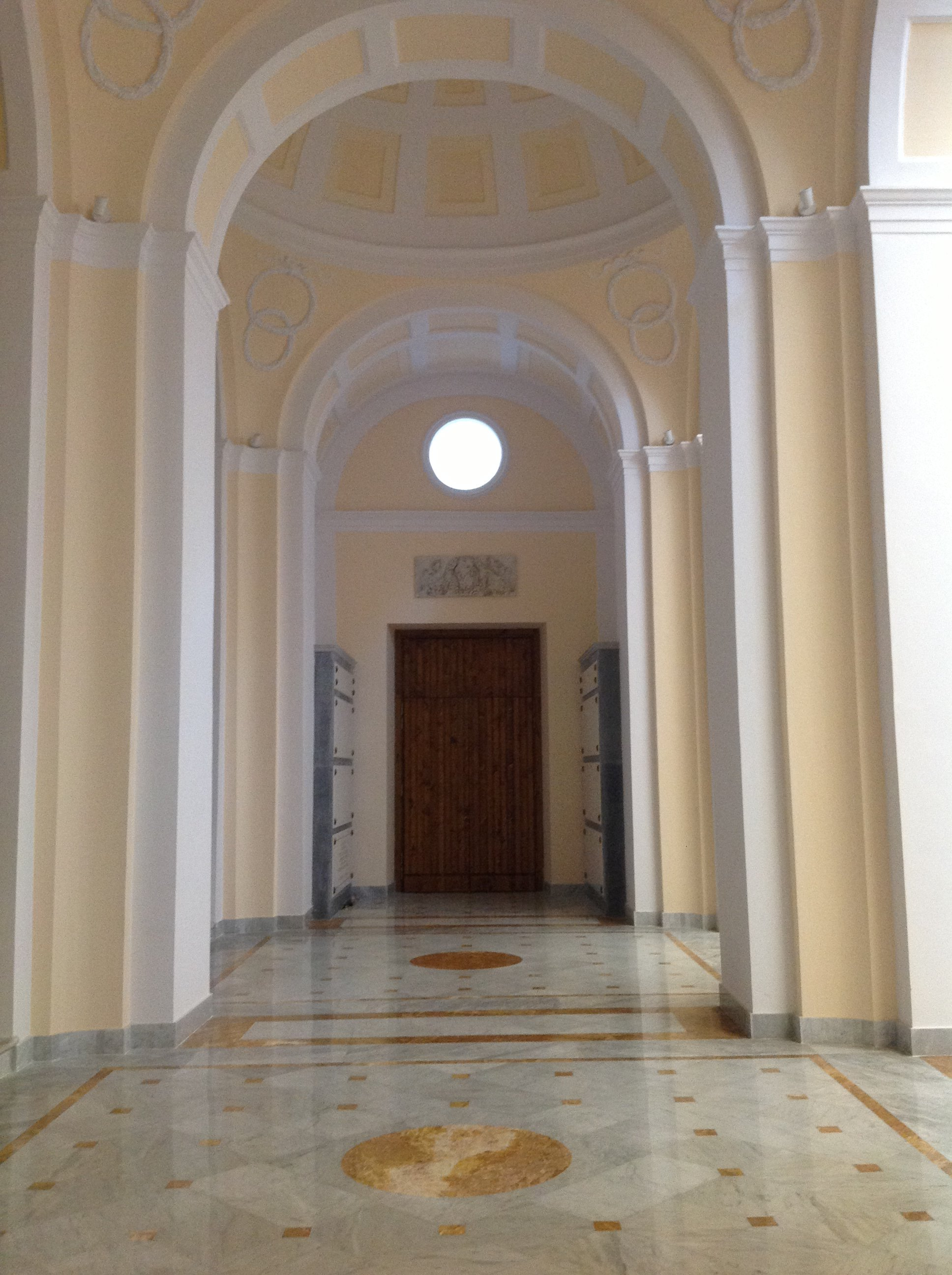
Right side aisle and tomb of the archbishops

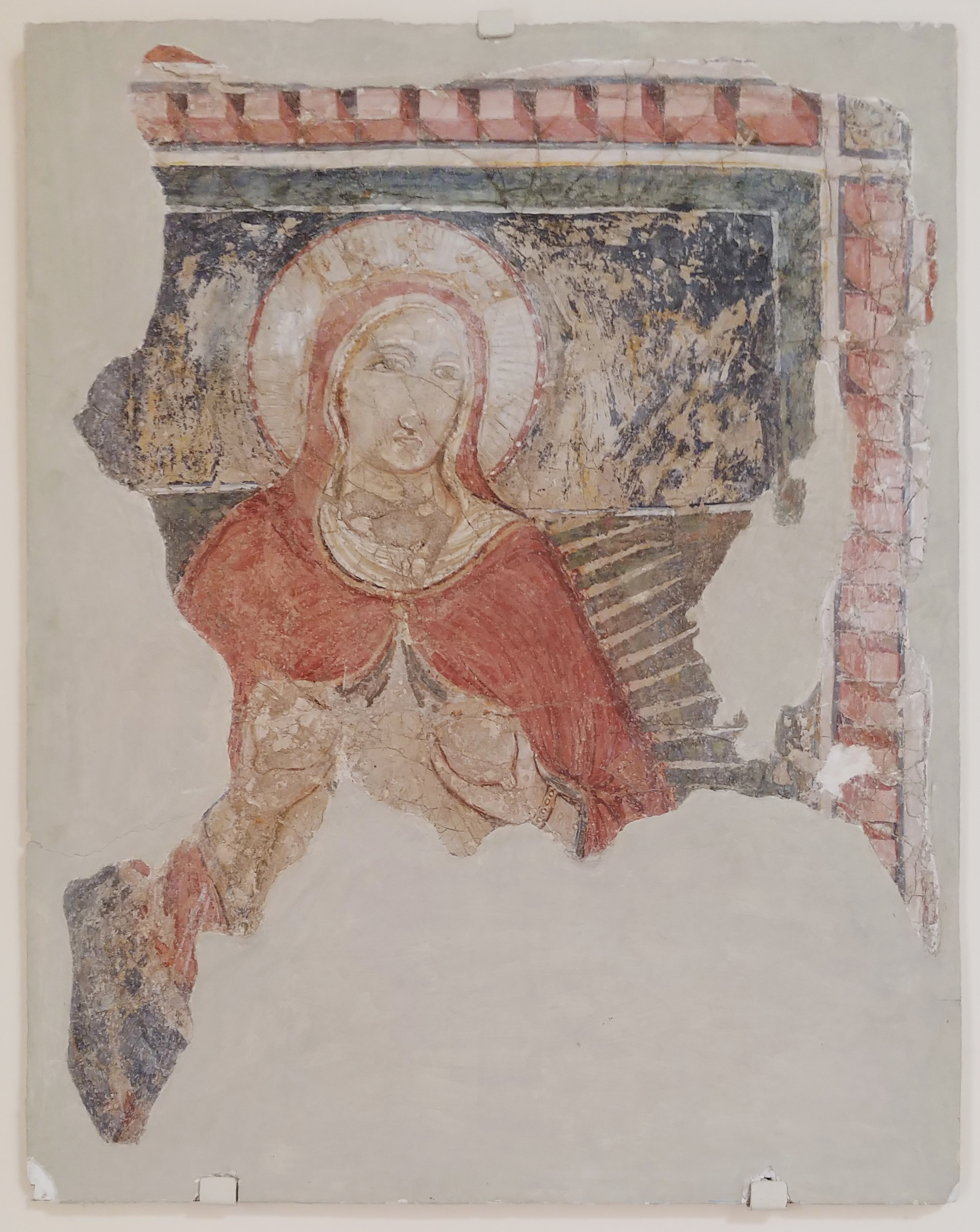
Fresco depicting St. Agatha

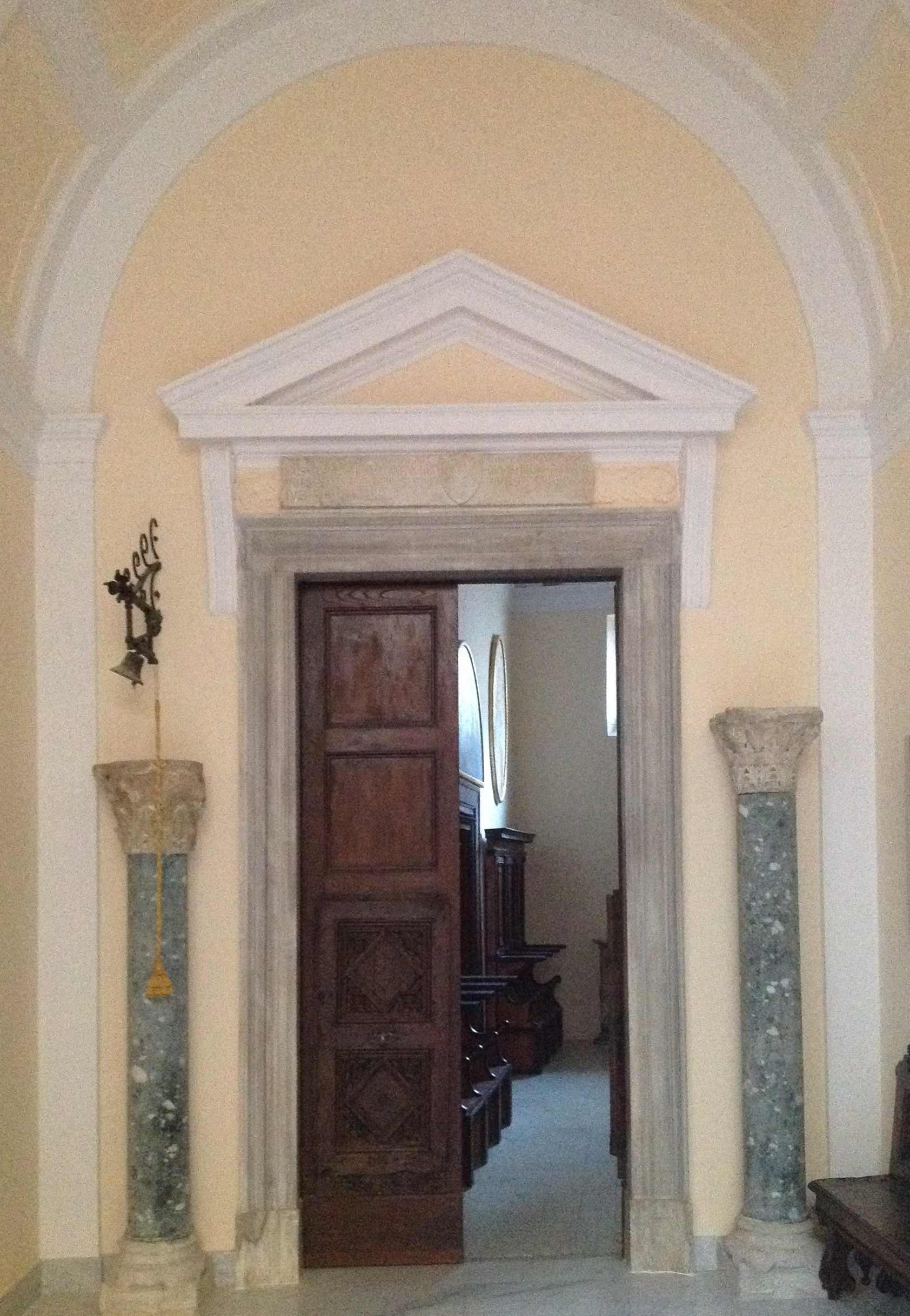
Portal of the sacristy of the hebdomadaries

===== Cosmatesque repertoire =====
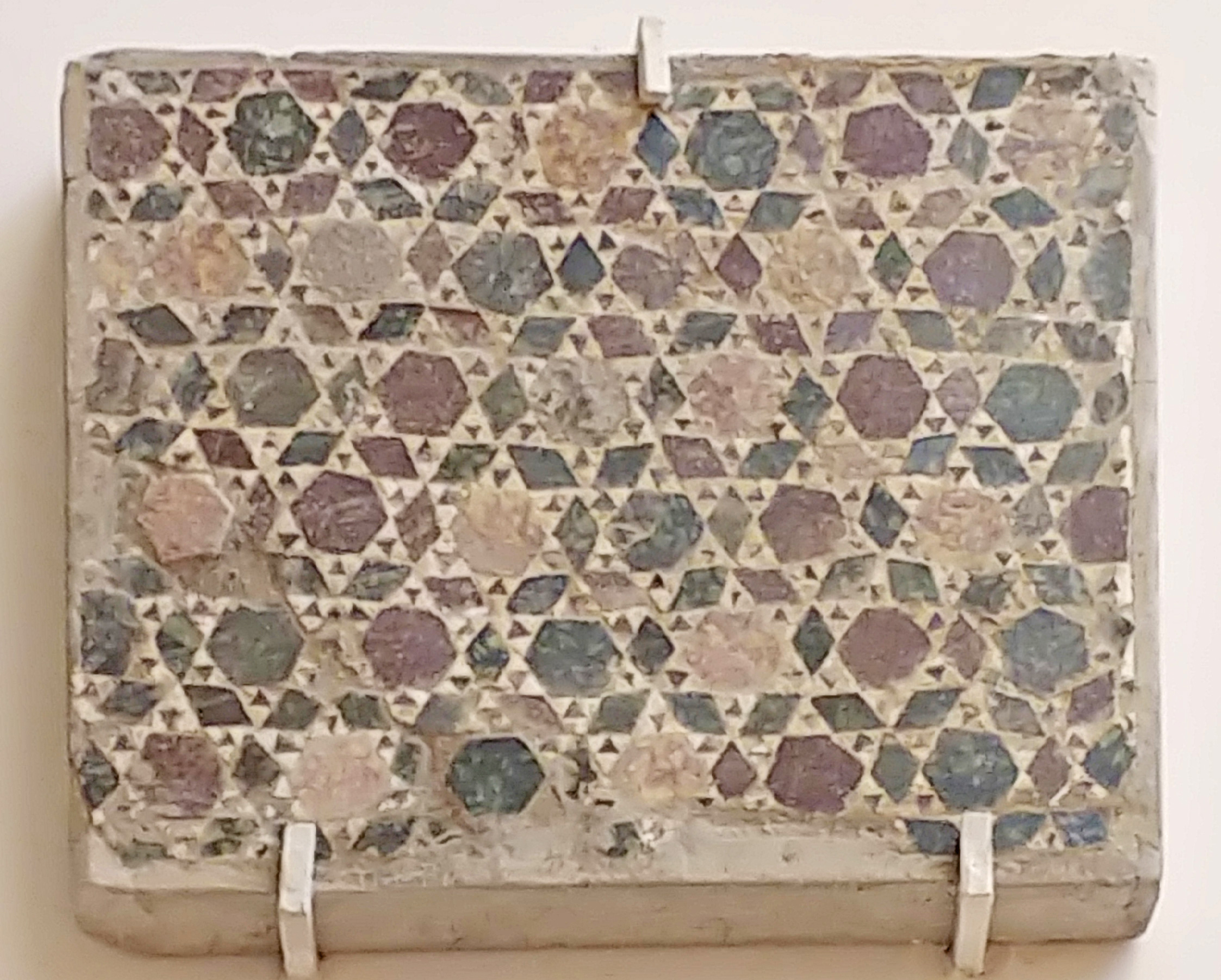
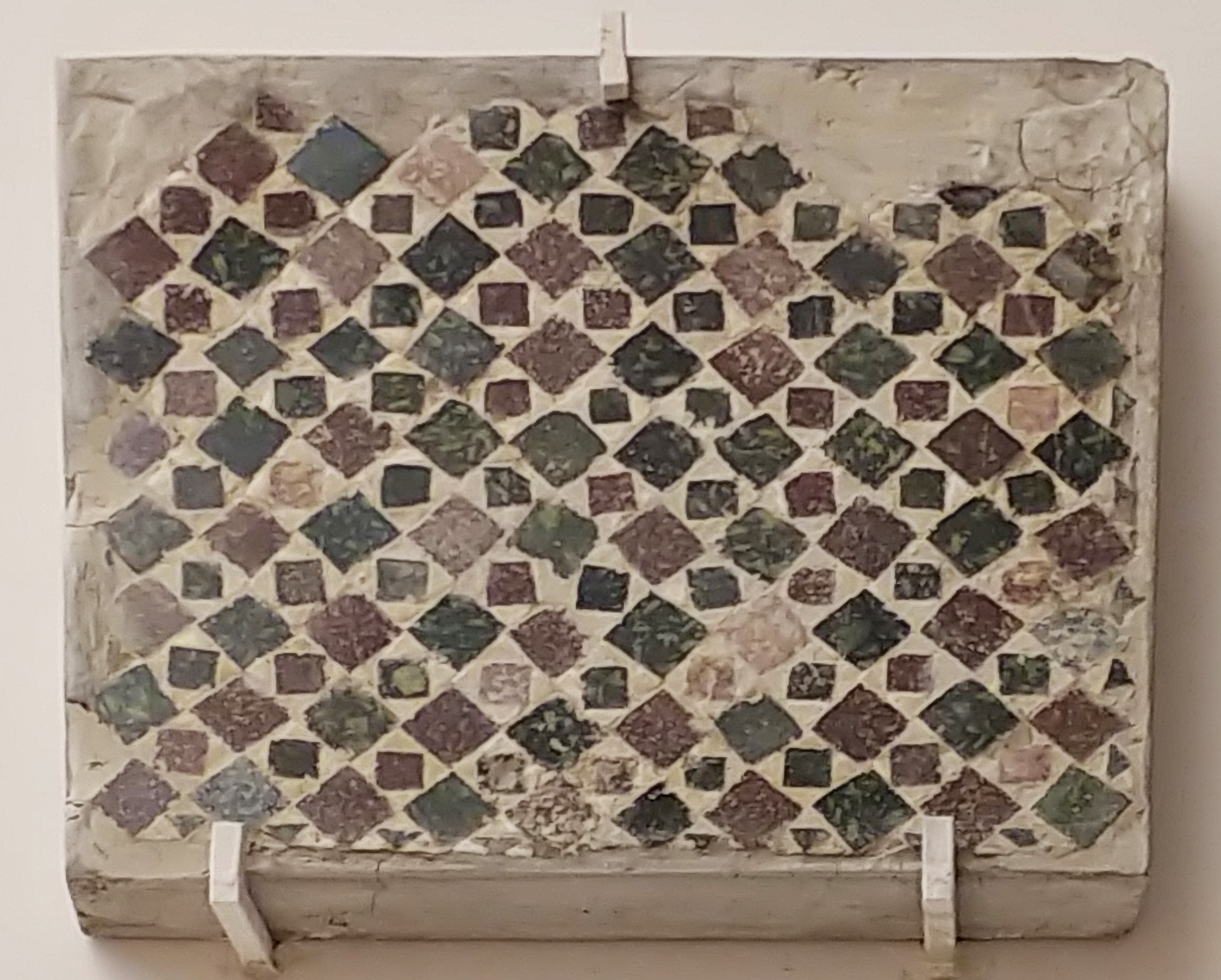
Fragments of cosmatesque flooring.

Several cosmatesque mosaic fragments previously collected at the seventh aisle have been dislocated in various places in the hall since 2014.

Only a few modestly sized slabs remain from the cathedral's ancient medieval flooring, discovered in 1932-1935 below the floor of the chancel and apse: the first with polychrome motifs respectively in squares with diagonally inscribed squares (under the third right arch of the nave), the second with hexagons surrounded by small rhombuses and triangles (under the third left arch of the nave), and the third with zig-zag ornamentation (in the seventh aisle). In the seventh aisle there are additional fragments as well, embedded in a movable platform already in use for the present ambon: the two larger ones are the one that constitutes the floor of the upper step, decorated with "an original boxed layout and T-band," and the one on the left side that features a cross inscribed in a clypeus; the three smaller ones consist of the aforementioned pavement slab with a zig-zag motif, one with opposing triangles alternating with diagonally placed squares (both on the right side), a third with alternating squares and rhombi with triangles (modern replica, on the first step), and a fourth analogous to the mosaic cornices of the balustrades that make up the chancel elevation.

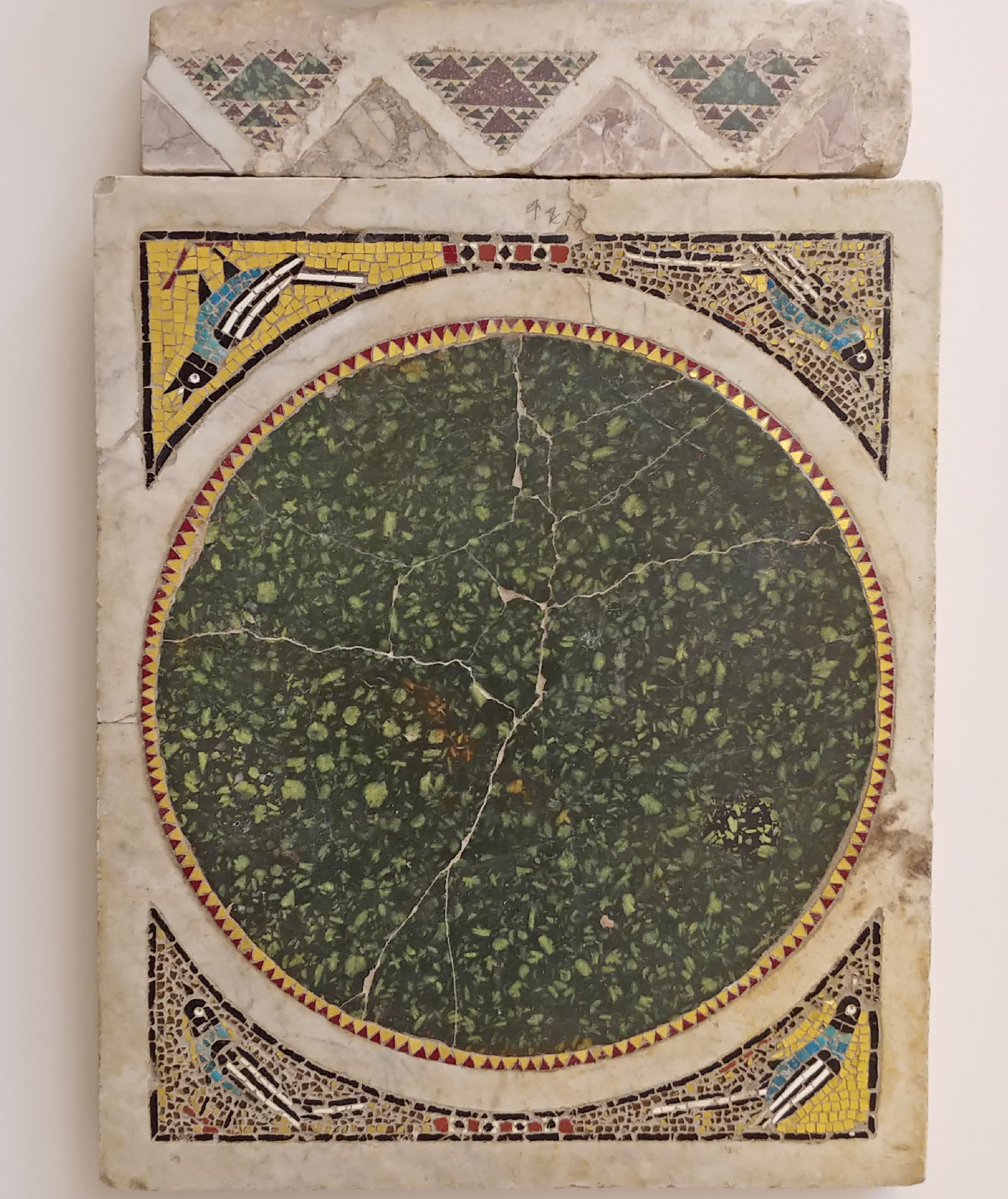
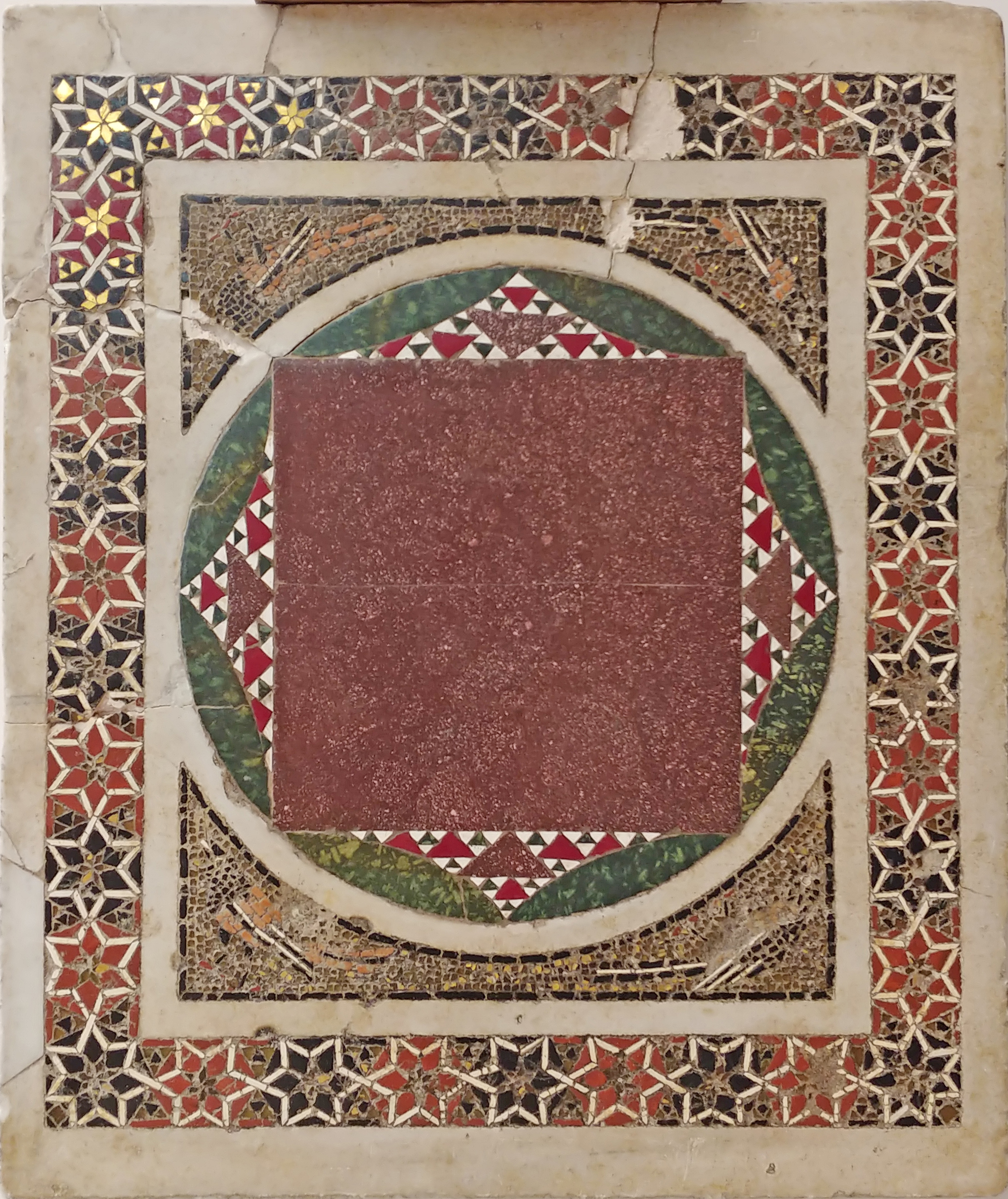
The two cosmatesque slabs placed on either side of the chancel, probably parapets of an ancient ambon.

Beneath the two side arches of the nave of access to the chancel, additional cosmatesque slabs are walled in, restored and supplemented at the time of their placement. Close to the northern pillars, above the sarcophagi, are two similar slabs: probably parapets of an ancient ambon, they present a circular central shaft (the one on the left slab with a green porphyry disk, the other with polychrome inlay forming an eight-pointed polygon) framed by opus tessellatum backgrounds on a gilded (left slab) or reddish (right slab) mosaic background with four birds (typical of Campania and southern Lazio) at the corners; only the right artifact has the original opus sectile frame consisting of a series of six-pointed stars and other geometric figures. On the southern pillar of the right arch there is a pluteus with a hexagonal geometric motif and cornice, while on that of the left arch there is another with an ornate interlacing of broken lines around an octagon.

Under the archway of access to the ambulatory of the sacristy, on the other hand, there is a square marble slab with projecting edges already reused as the back of the 1989 cathedra (north half-pillar) and a large panel with complex decorative scheme characterized by a series of knots similar to those in the Honorian presbytery of the basilica of San Lorenzo fuori le mura in Rome (south half-pillar). On the right wall of the adjacent ambulatory find place two slabs extensively integrated into the mosaic decoration, placed side by side and bearing conspicuous portions of quincunx, probably belonging to a single original element; on the opposite wall, on the other hand, mounted on a bracket so that both sides can be seen, there is an artifact from the area of the De Vio palace, which on one face presents the coat of arms of the Rogano family with an inscription pertaining to the tomb of Giovanni Battista, son of Vincenzo, and on the other there is a quincunx adorned with modern marble decoration.

===== Seventh nave =====
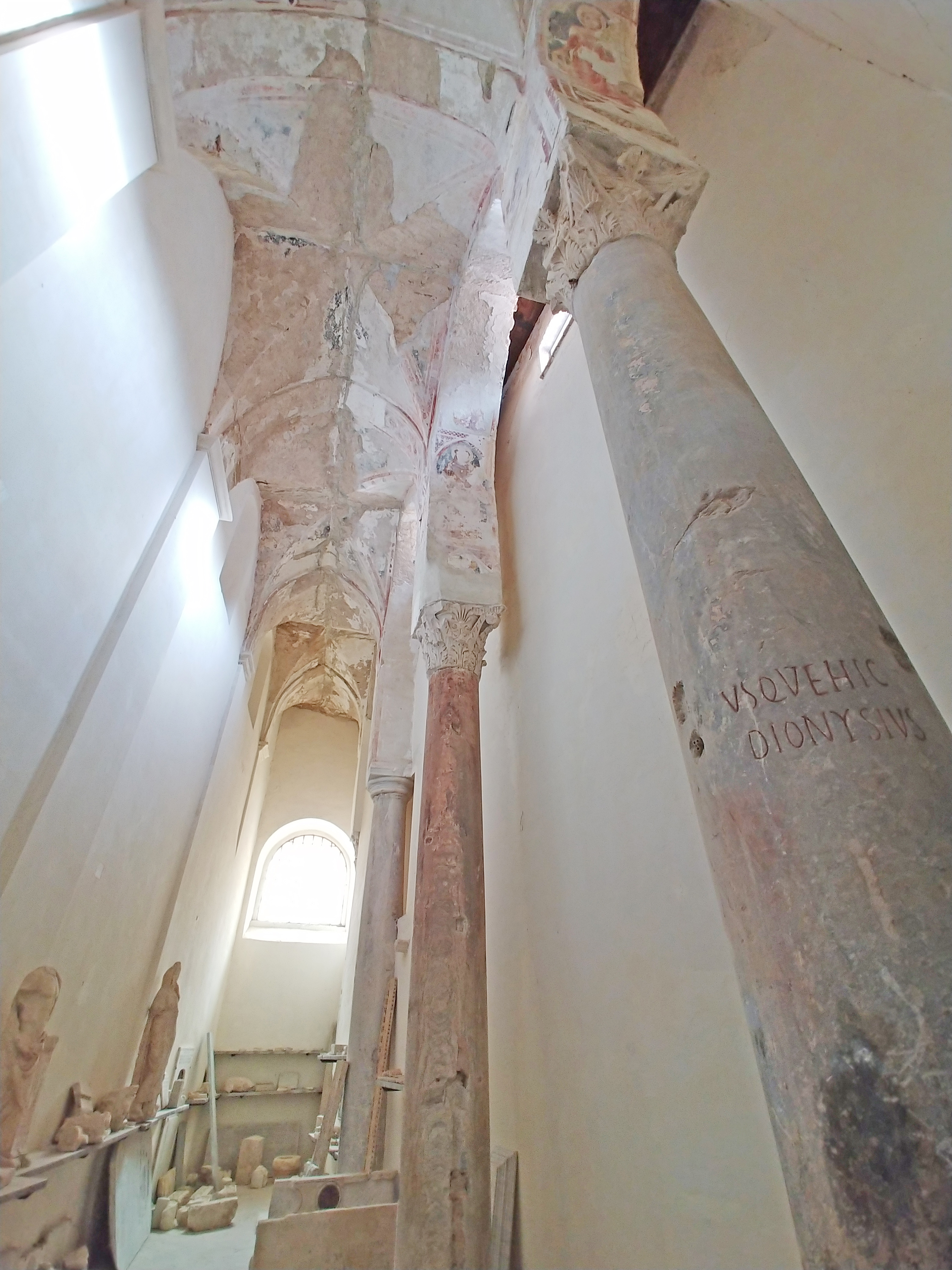
The seventh aisle.

Behind the right side chapels is the so-called seventh aisle (formerly known as the old church), i.e., the easternmost aisle of the 13th-century building (with seven aisles), carved out by repurposing the left side aisle of the 11th-12th-century cathedral (with three aisles, in the opposite orientation from the present one). In the first half of the 20th century it was the site of a permanent exhibition of stone artifacts and pictorial works, which, in 1956, went on to form the first nucleus of the diocesan museum, set up in the rooms of the facade above the pronaos.

The entrance to the room consists of a simple Serlian window with a round arch and two marble composite columns with fluted shafts and carved capitals; it is surmounted by a 13th-century marble relief, formerly above the 1989 cathedra, depicting an eagle holding a serpent in its talons. The nave has an irregular trapezoidal plan, with a gradual narrowing toward the current cathedral façade originally due to a pre-existing street (today's Via Duomo) and currently accentuated by the protrusion of the eighteenth-century side chapels dictated by the desire to regularize the interior layout of the thirteenth-century church, as well as attributable to "reasons related to the particular morphology of the terrain." The nave is divided into four bays and its roof is an ogival cross-vault, with pointed arches set on high corbels. Four ancient columns are visible, three Corinthian and one Tuscan (the one at the chapel of St. Bernard); the one closest to the entrance bears the following engraved inscription in Latin: VSQUE HIC DIONYSIVS. Natural light is provided through a large round-arched window that stands next to the present facade of the cathedral, and single-lancet windows that are located at the top of the side walls.

The vault of the first three bays closest to the present entrance has traces of medieval polychrome frescoes, representing geometric cornices, coffers, faux marble carvings in cosmatesque style, and figures of saints: St. Catherine of Alexandria at the base of the intrados of the second column; individual figures within the clypei in the webs of the first bay (of which only a bishop saint, probably Erasmus, is recognizable); St. John the Baptist with the Albito family crest); and St. Francis of Assisi in the intrados of the next bay. The frescoes can be dated to the end of the 14th century and can be attributed to artists from Lazio (for the ornamental motifs) and Campania (for the figures). Pictorial traces (partly reduced to sinopia) can also be found on the remains of the Gothic vaults still visible in the attic of the first bay of the present right aisle, probably dating from the early 15th century and depicting in addition to a star motif the evangelists Mark and Matthew.

Arranged along the side walls are numerous stone artifacts from various periods including the tombstone of Agostino De Ortis, O.P., bishop of Satriano from 1500 to 1521, originally located in the church of San Domenico in Gaeta, where his burial place was located; from the same church come a number of stone fragments, including one of a screen adorned with a pelte motif, and others with wicker interlacing. Other artifacts include a window frame with arches from the ancient church of San Francesco, a fragment with knotted circular mesh decoration and rosettes.

==== Side chapels ====
Three side chapels are located on each of the aisles.

===== Right chapels =====
Chapel of St. Bernard

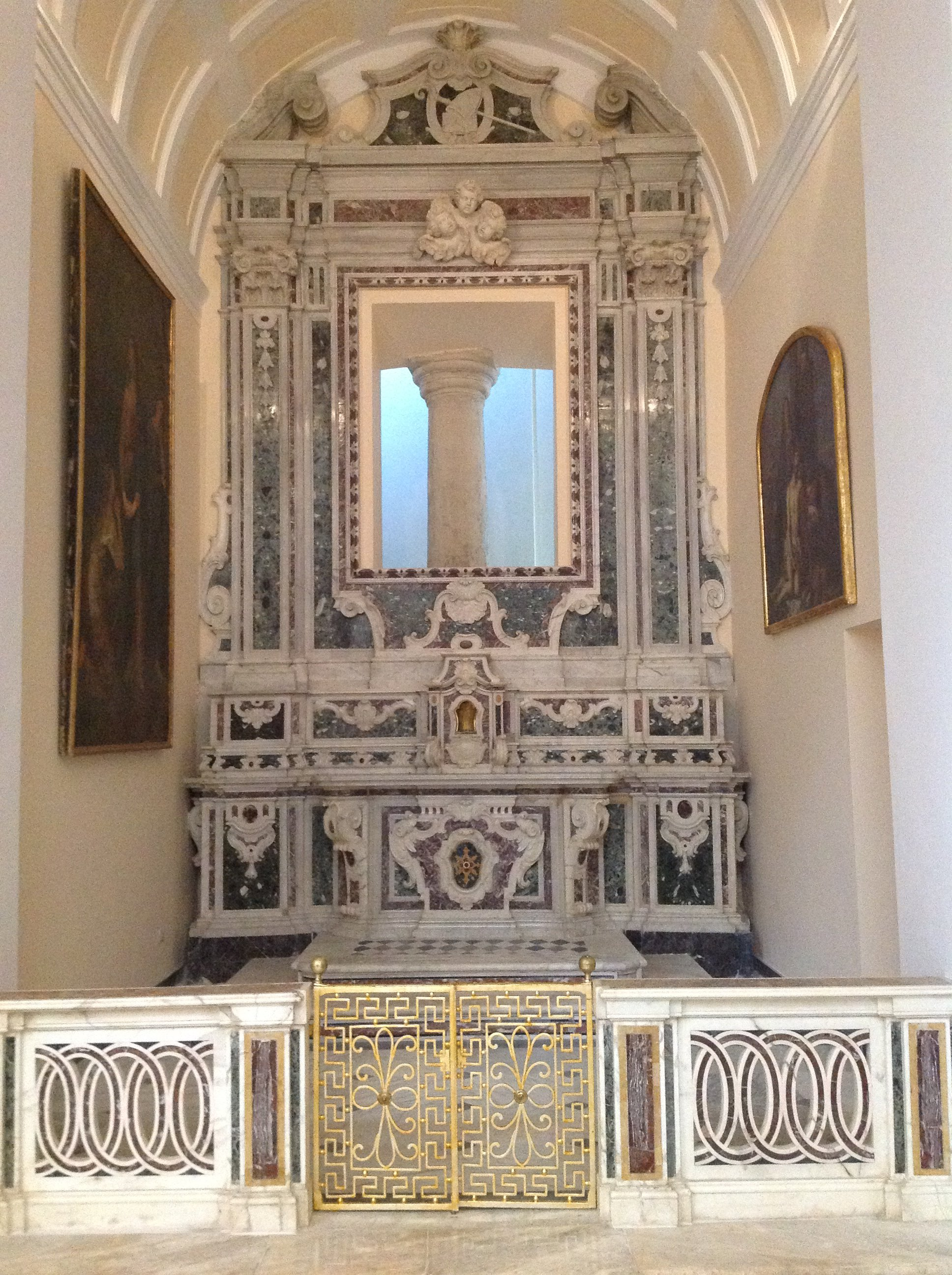
Chapel of St. Bernard.

The first chapel on the right is dedicated to St. Bernard of Clairvaux, as was originally the altar in it, which was made in 1705 by Domenico Antonio Vaccaro for the church of St. Catherine of Alexandria and transferred to the cathedral in 1810. It was later dedicated to Saint Gabriel the Archangel, depicted in a polychrome statue from 1828 located in the center of the altarpiece, and then used as the custody of the Blessed Sacrament. During the 2008-2014 restorations, the effigy of the saint was removed and in its place an opening was made to allow a view of part of one of the columns of the seventh nave.

The altar is made of polychrome marble and occupies the entire back wall; above the mensa, rises the altarpiece with an architrave ideally supported by two Corinthian pilasters placed at the ends; above the niche where the statue of St. Gabriel the Archangel once stood, a sculptural group with three putti finds its place; in the center of the pediment, which forms the crowning of the artifact, is a bas-relief depicting the attributes of St. Bernard of Clairvaux. At the center of the altarpiece, while leaving visible the column behind, was placed in 2016 the 17th-century wooden crucifix, a donation from St. Alphonsus Maria de' Liguori, formerly at the beginning of the left aisle, while immediately behind the balustrade was placed a polychrome wooden bust depicting St. Blaise.

The two side walls house as many altarpieces, both dating back to the 19th century: on the right, the Pietà by Pietro Abbadessa; on the left, the Three Marys by Gennaro Ruo, formerly on the altar of the left side aisle of the temple of St. Francis.

Chapel of St. Catherine of Alexandria

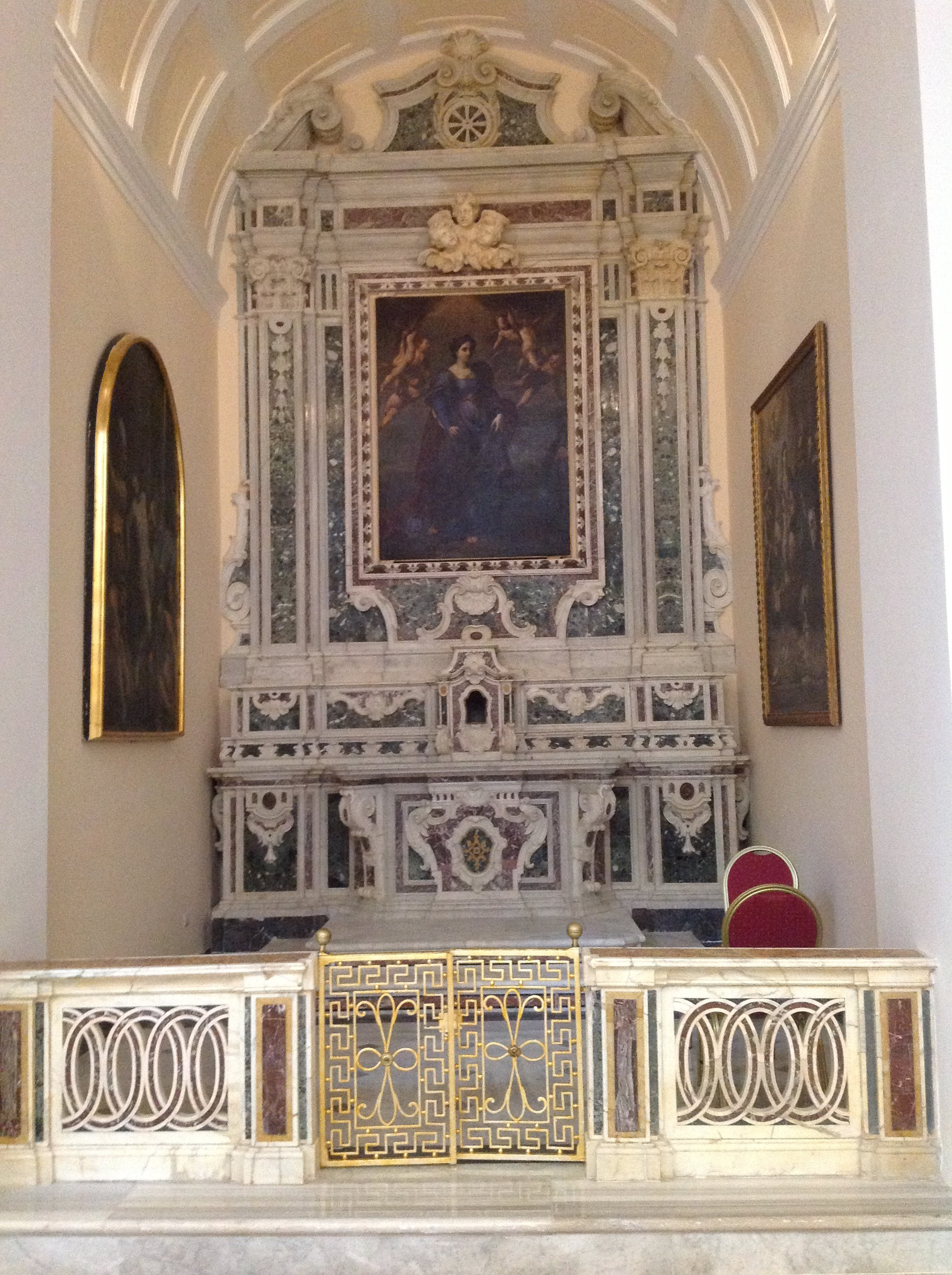
Chapel of St. Catherine of Alexandria.

The second chapel on the right is dedicated to St. Catherine of Alexandria, while previously it was dedicated to the Immaculate Virgin.

The altar, made of polychrome marble, was made in 1705 by Domenico Antonio Vaccaro together with the identical altar in the first chapel, for the church of St. Catherine of Alexandria; originally dedicated to the martyr, it was later titled to the Immaculate Virgin and, in the altarpiece, was placed the painting Immaculate Virgin Appearing to the Souls in Purgatory by an anonymous local painter of the 18th century, which is why the room was also called the Chapel of Purgatory. Currently, the altarpiece consists of the original painting, depicting Saint Catherine of Alexandria and an autograph work by Andrea Vaccaro, which can be traced back to the terminal phase of the painter's activity (mid-seventeenth century); the saint is presented as the sole and monumental protagonist, standing in the center of the scene, in the act of ideally advancing toward the viewer holding a palm in her hand while six cherubs crown her, opening the dark blanket of clouds around her. In the center of the crowning of the altar is a bas-relief of the wheel, an instrument of martyrdom and attribute of St. Catherine.

On the two side walls are paintings: on the left, a Flagellation of Christ by an unknown 17th-century author of the Neapolitan school, from the collections of the National Museum of Capodimonte and granted in 1938–39 to the church of San Domenico in Gaeta; on the right, Madonna of the Rosary by Sebastiano Conca (18th century).

Bourbon Shrine

The third chapel on the right has no altar: it is deeper than the others to the extent that it occupies two aisles of the 13th-century building in width, and its primary function is to connect the cathedral's rear entrance, consisting of the portal that is at the top of the staircase of the base of the bell tower, to the hall. During the 2008-2014 restorations, it was turned into a Bourbon shrine, which was inaugurated on November 29, 2014, bringing into the church some sepulchral monuments already kept in some neoclassical rooms located below the hall, which were accessed through a flight of stairs in the left bay of the atrium.

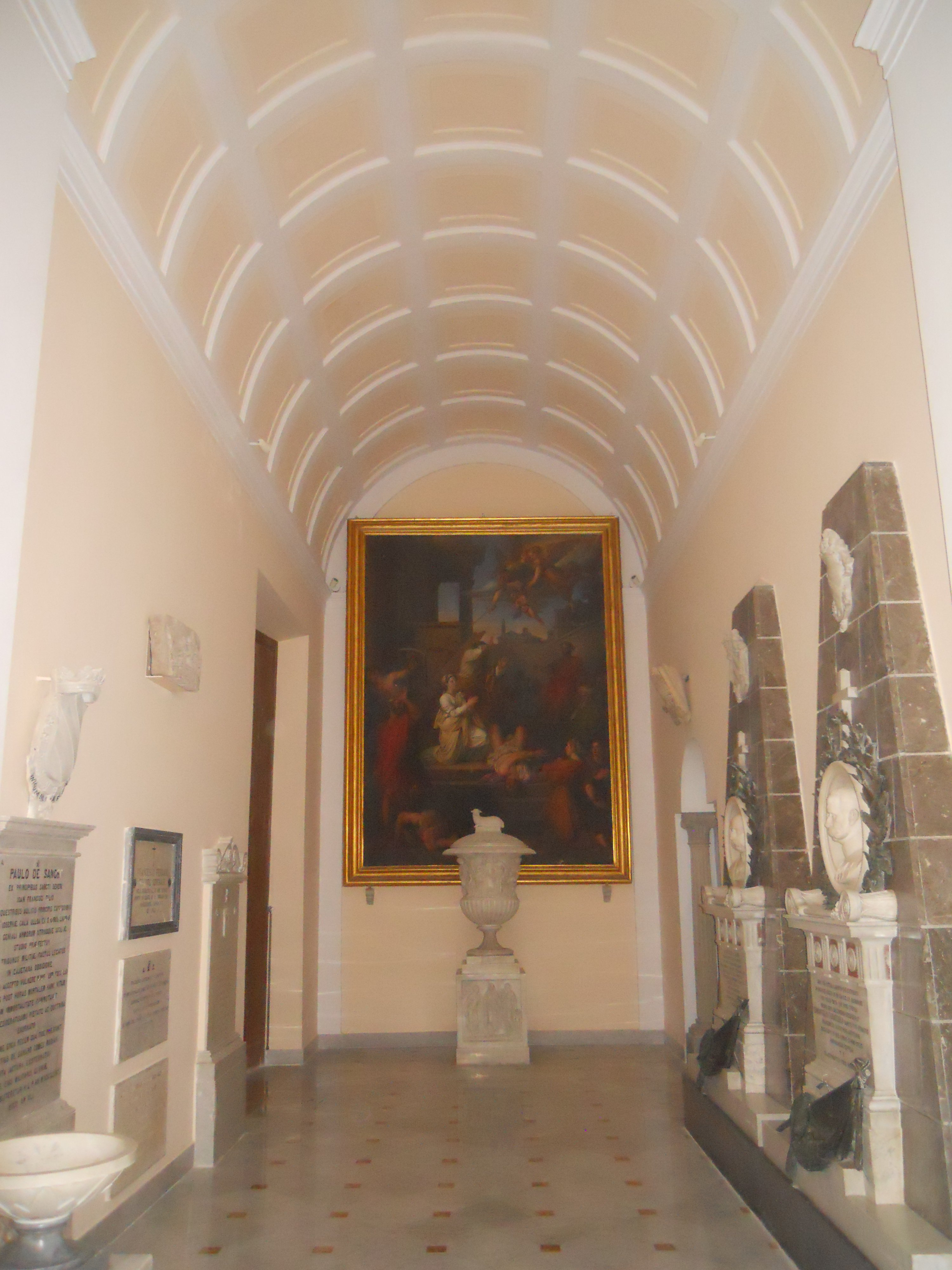
Third chapel on the right.

The portal of the bell tower is located, undecorated, at the end of the left wall. On axis with it there is the entrance to the seventh nave; the present one dates from the 21st-century restorations and replaces the original 18th-century one, consisting of a simple door. The back wall of the room is occupied for almost its entire surface by the altarpiece Martyrdom of St. Catherine of Alexandria by Gaetano Forte (1856), which came from the church St. Catherine of Alexandria, where it was placed above the high altar, and placed in the cathedral in 1988.

In front of the same wall sits the old marble baptismal font, a 19th-century neoclassical sculpture; traditionally attributed at least in part to Antonio Canova but more likely the work of Paolo Persico, it was donated by Ferdinand I of the Two Sicilies to replace the previous font. The latter had been carved from a marble vase by the Athenian sculptor Salpion (1st century B.C.), which had been found in Formia on the seashore and had been installed in the cathedral by Bishop Pedro de Oña, O. de M. (1605–1626); both were located at the beginning of the right aisle. The nineteenth-century artifact consists of a bell krater adorned with a bas-relief depicting the Baptism of Christ and surmounted by a lid on the top of which is a full-relief sculpture of the Agnus Dei; the base consists of a pedestal that on the front wall of the dado has the Theological Virtues in relief.

Below the arch connecting the chapel with the right aisle is a neoclassical stoup. On the side walls of the room are the funerary monuments of several fallen soldiers during the siege of Gaeta in 1860-1861. On the right wall, there are two steles of similar features and of considerable size in neoclassical style, already present in the chapel before the 2008-2014 restorations: both steles consist of a truncated pyramid made of squared dark stones with the front part of an altar in front with the epigraph, and the bas-relief and coat of arms of the deceased; the monument closest to the nave is that of General Emmanuele Caracciolo, Duke of San Vito, while the other is of General Riccardo De Sangro. On the opposite wall are the memorial of Lieutenant Colonel Matteo Negri (near the entrance to the bell tower) and that of Lieutenant Colonel Paolo De Sangro (near the nave); in the center are three plaques commemorating, respectively, the creation in 1908 of the shrine below the cathedral hall by the municipality of Gaeta, the canons who fell during the siege, Lieutenant General Francesco Ferrari, and the creation of the present shrine in 2014; the ensemble is surmounted by a bas-relief crown from a 15th-century coat of arms.

===== Left chapels =====
Chapel of Our Lady of Mount Carmel

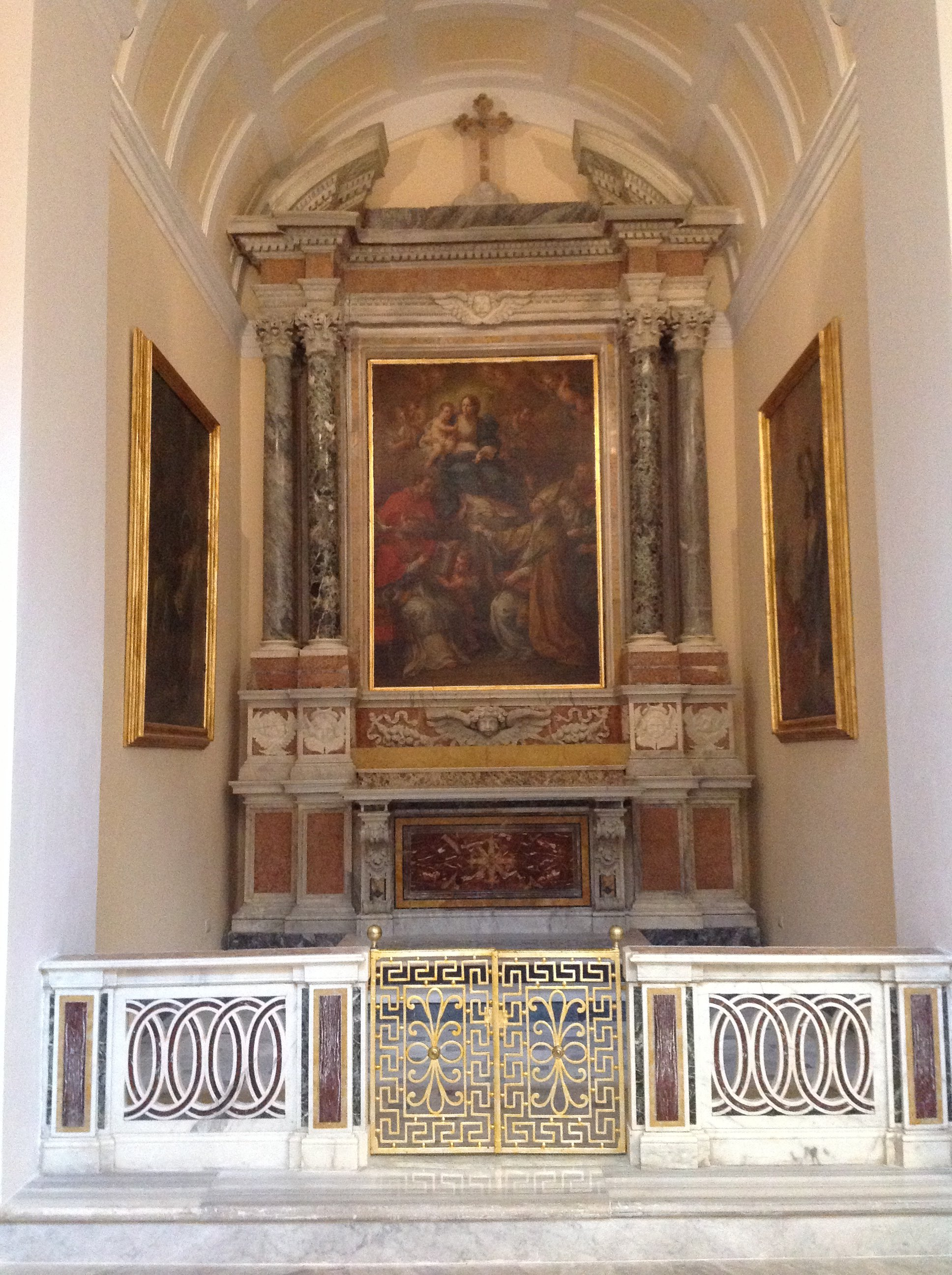
Chapel of Our Lady of Mount Carmel.

The first chapel on the left is dedicated to the Blessed Virgin Mary of Mount Carmel.

The altar entirely occupies the back wall of the room; it dates back to the mid-18th century and is attributable to the Neapolitan artist Ferdinando Sanfelice or his collaborator Giuseppe Astarita; it was later modified in the 19th century by Pietro Paolo Ferrara, who made a new antependium. The altar is in polychrome marble, and the altarpiece is surmounted by a high cornice supported by two pairs of plain Corinthian columns; at the base of each, there is a bas-relief depicting an angel. Below the altarpiece, however, is an angel's head in high relief between two festoons. The crowning of the altar consists of a broken tympanum having, in the center, a marble cross. The altarpiece is a painting on canvas by Sebastiano Conca depicting the Madonna and Child between Saints Charles Borromeo, Pius V, Lawrence, Philip Neri and Gennaro (1763), signed and dated on the plinth, a work of the artist's maturity that combines his experience in pietistic-devotional painting with references to the Solimenism of his early years; the five saints honoring the Virgin and Child (the latter placed above among angelic hosts) represent the different degrees of the Catholic hierarchy, respectively the cardinalate, pontificate, diaconate, presbyterate, and episcopate.

On the side walls, two paintings, both from the 17th century, find their place: the left one, a Deposition of Christ, by an unknown 17th-century painter and also from the collections of the National Museum of Capodimonte and formerly in San Domenico; the right one, Tobias and the Angel by Agostino Beltrano (first half of the century), formerly in the Diocesan Museum.

Chapel of the Blessed Sacrament

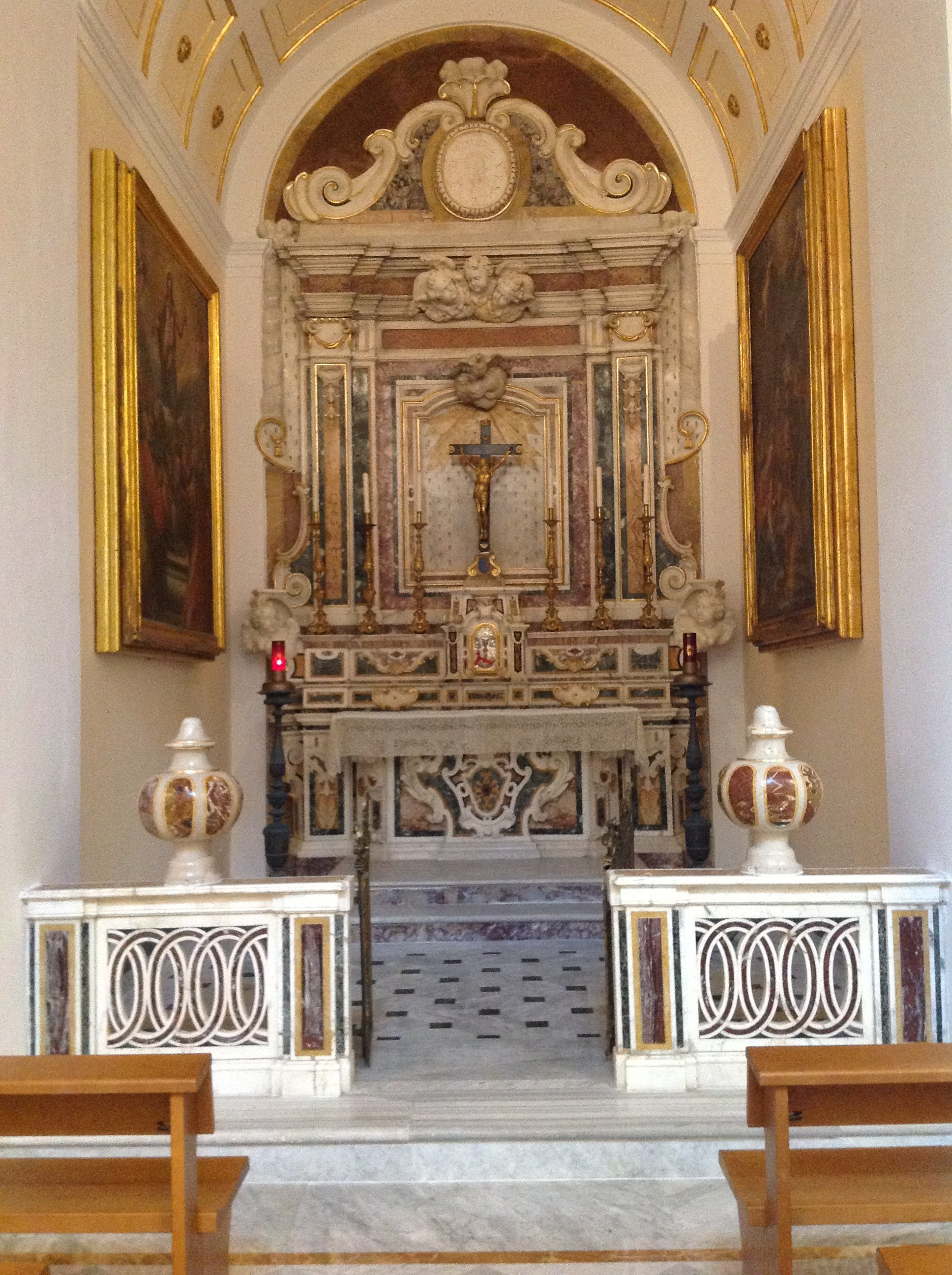
Chapel of the Blessed Sacrament.

The second chapel on the left is used to house the Blessed Sacrament; previously, it was dedicated to Our Lady of the Rosary, and a 20th-century painting reproducing the image of Our Lady of Pompeii was placed in the center of the altarpiece.

The polychrome marble altar, located close to the back wall, is attributable to Domenico Antonio Vaccaro and dates back to the early 18th century; it was probably originally located in the church of San Domenico (of which it would have been the high altar) and would have been transferred to the cathedral after the church was closed to worship in 1813. The altarpiece has no reredos, and in the center of it is a rectangular niche with the arched upper side surmounted by a high relief depicting the Dove of the Holy Spirit: it currently frames a Crucifix of the school of Alessandro Algardi, and its quilted decoration echoes that of the marble veil that ideally is behind the altar and can be seen protruding from the sides of the altarpiece. In the center of the coronation finds its place an oval painting on copper by Sebastiano Conca, depicting God the Blessing Father among angels. On either side of the altar are two bronze candelabra with the image of St. Erasmus and the coats of arms of the donors, dating from the 17th century and part of the original furnishings of the crypt.

On the side walls are two paintings on canvas: the one on the left wall depicts the Assumption of Mary and is the work of Girolamo Imparato (shortly after 1600), extensively reworked, formerly in the apse of the temple of St. Francis; the one on the right, on the other hand, depicts the Adoration of the Magi and is of the Neapolitan school (16th century).

Chapel of St. Philip Neri

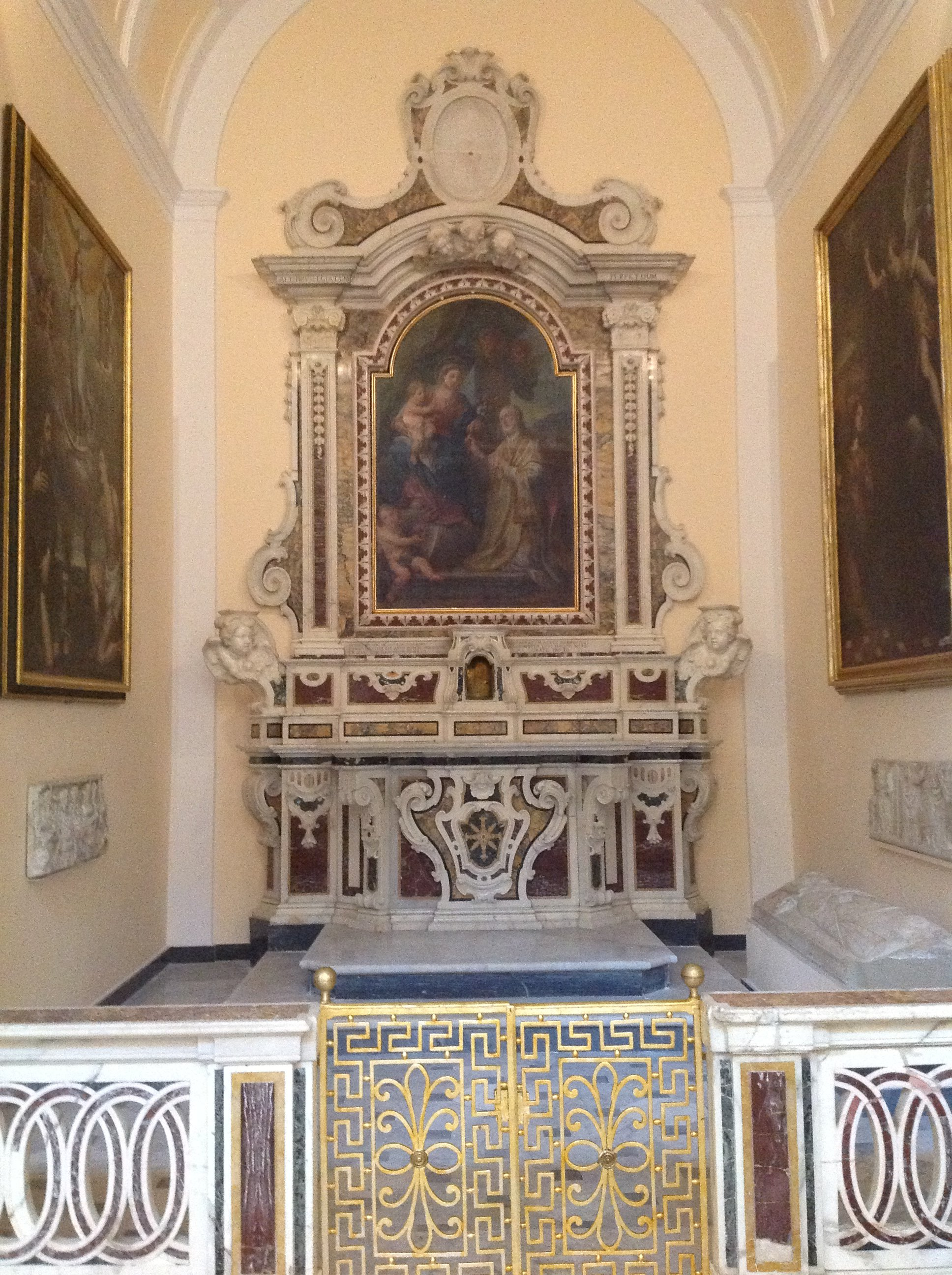
Chapel of St. Philip Neri.

The third chapel on the left is dedicated to St. Philip Neri, depicted in the altarpiece; previously, it was dedicated to the Nativity, while originally the dedicatory saint was St. Silvanus of Emesa.

The altar is in polychrome marble, and was made in 1767 on a commission from the Rogano family. dating from the 18th century; of those in the cathedral's side chapels, it is the most modest in terms of size. Above the mensa and riser (decorated at the ends with two angel heads) rises the altarpiece, framed between two Corinthian pilasters; in the center is located the altarpiece Madonna and Child and St. Philip Neri by Sebastiano Conca.

On the side walls are two paintings: on the left the Immaculate Virgin among angels and Saints Roch and Sebastian, from the 18th century; on the right the Annunciation attributed to Claudio Ridolfi, from the 16th-17th centuries.

There are also ancient marble sculptures in the chapel: on the left wall, a Roman bas-relief with Monads from the 3rd-4th centuries AD; on the right wall, the surviving elements of the ancient sepulchral monument of the bishop of Gaeta Francesco II Gattola (1321–1340). This originally stood in the Gattola family chapel located at first in the northeastern area of the building and then, after the construction of the 16th-century apse and crypt, it was moved to the first one on the right; following the cathedral restorations by Pietro Paolo Ferrara it became part of the lapidary collection of the seventh nave and then found its present location in 2014. On the floor, slightly elevated, is the marble lid, of the double-sloping type according to the ancient Ravenna model, on which the deceased is depicted in pontifical robes; at the base is an inscription on which the name of the deceased and the date of death are written in Gothic capitals. On the wall above the lid is a fragmentary bas-relief depicting the Madonna and Child to whom a bishop is presented kneeling by a saint (perhaps St. Paul or St. Bartholomew) and bearing the Gattola coat of arms, datable to between the 14th and 15th centuries; it is possible that it belongs to the other sarcophagus that was in the chapel and housed the remains of three bishops of the same family: Bartolomeo and Giovanni Antonello, bishops of Caiazzo (who died in 1390 and 1394, respectively) and Bartolomeo, archbishop of Messina (who died in 1446).

==== Presbytery ====
The presbytery entirely occupies the last bay of the nave and the connecting bay between the nave and the apse; the current layout dates back to the 2008-2014 restorations, during which the 19th-century double staircase, the polychrome marble balustrade and the 1989 cathedra were demolished, and the current space was designed ex novo, within which elements from various periods and of different workmanship are collected.

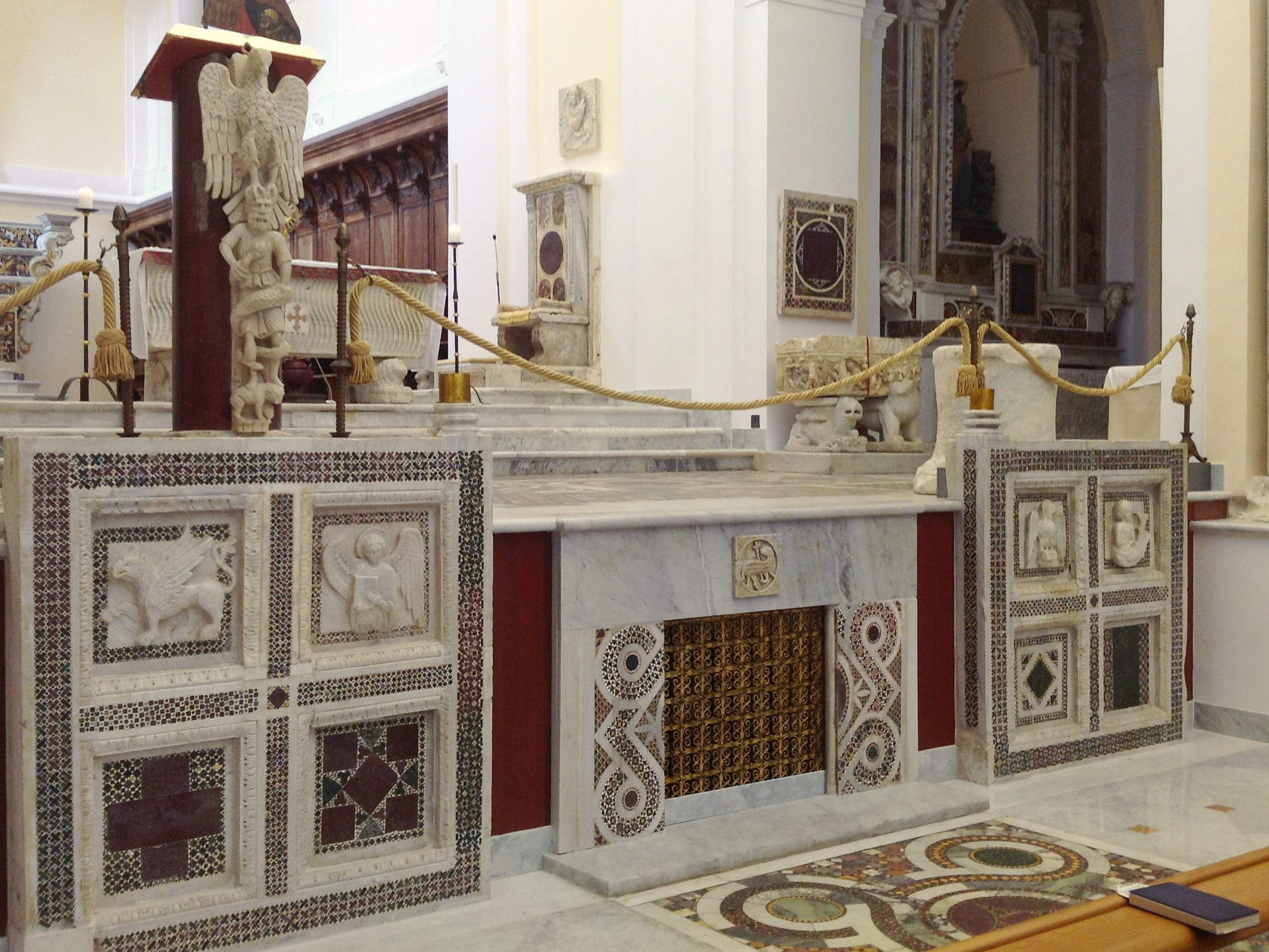
The front part of the chancel.

The area is elevated above the rest of the church, and is connected to the hall by two symmetrical flights of stairs placed in the last bay of the aisles. The façade on the nave has a lattice in the center overlooking the entrance to the crypt, with a marble frame in relief with a segmental arch resting on two half-columns, installed in 2015–16 in place of the previous decoration, consisting of two fragments of Cosmatesque mosaic on the sides (currently walled near the sacristy doorway) and a bas-relief with the Agnus Dei (currently on the back of the high altar). On the sides are two transepts obtained by Franco Vitelli by dismembering the altar of the former church of Santa Lucia, made in 1928 by Gino Chierici using medieval elements from the plutei of that church, long thought to belong to the parapet of the cathedral's ancient pulpit, and granted to it on loan in 2008. These are decorated with mosaics and bas-reliefs datable to the second half of the 12th century and attributable to a Roman workshop, probably linked to Nicola d'Angelo, depicting on the left one a Griffon (symbol of both wisdom and the strength of Christ) and the Angel (symbol of the evangelist Matthew), on the right one the Eagle (symbol of the evangelist John) and a two-tailed Mermaid (symbol of lust). Four other panels, housed in the Isabella Stewart-Gardner Museum in Boston, USA, belong to the cycle, depicting a Deer (symbol of the believer), the Lion (symbol of the evangelist Mark), the Bull (symbol of the evangelist Luke) and a Basilisk (considered a devilish animal, symbol of sin and in some cases also of heresy).

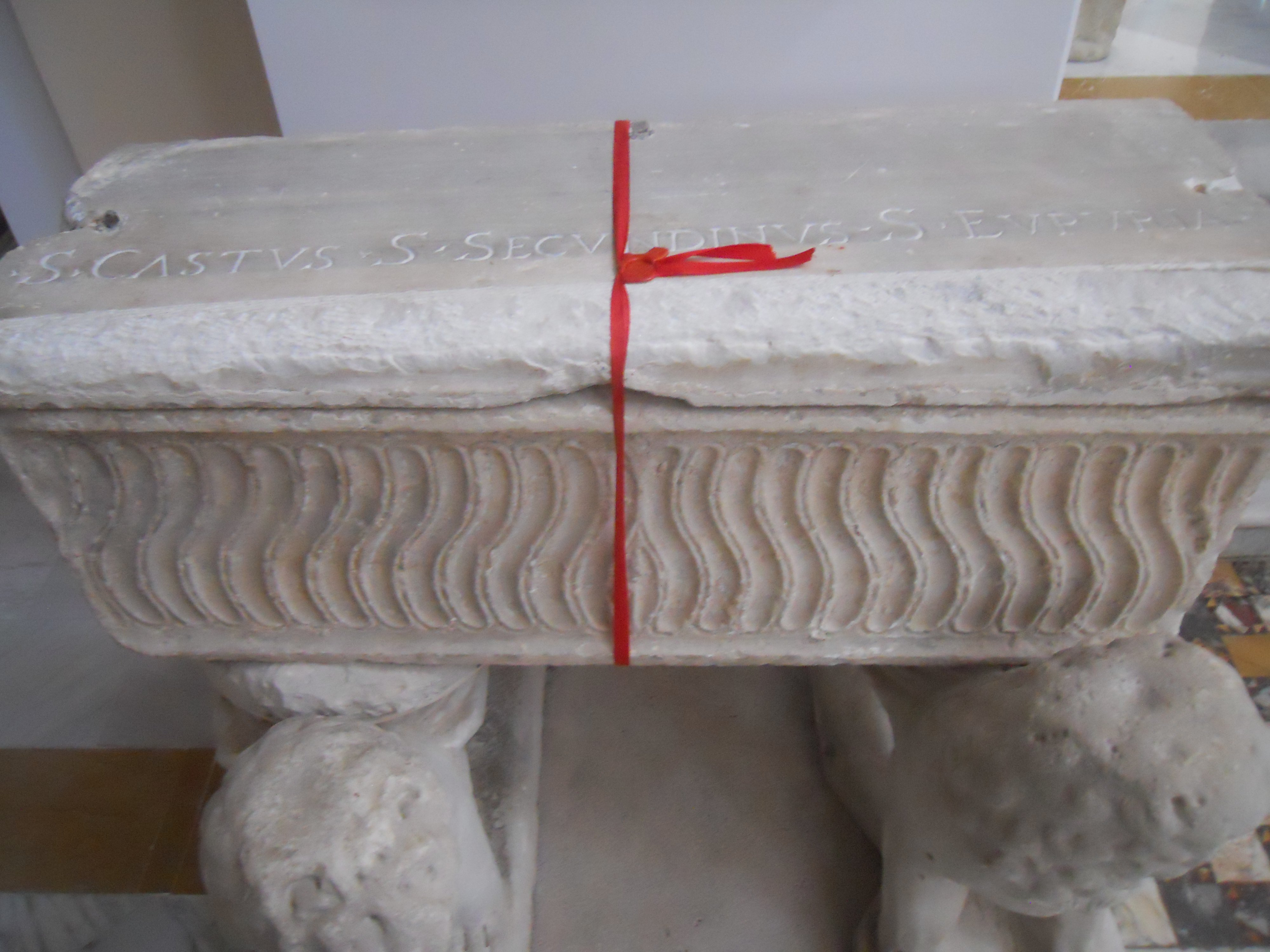
Sarcophagus of Saints Castus, Secondinus and Eupuria.

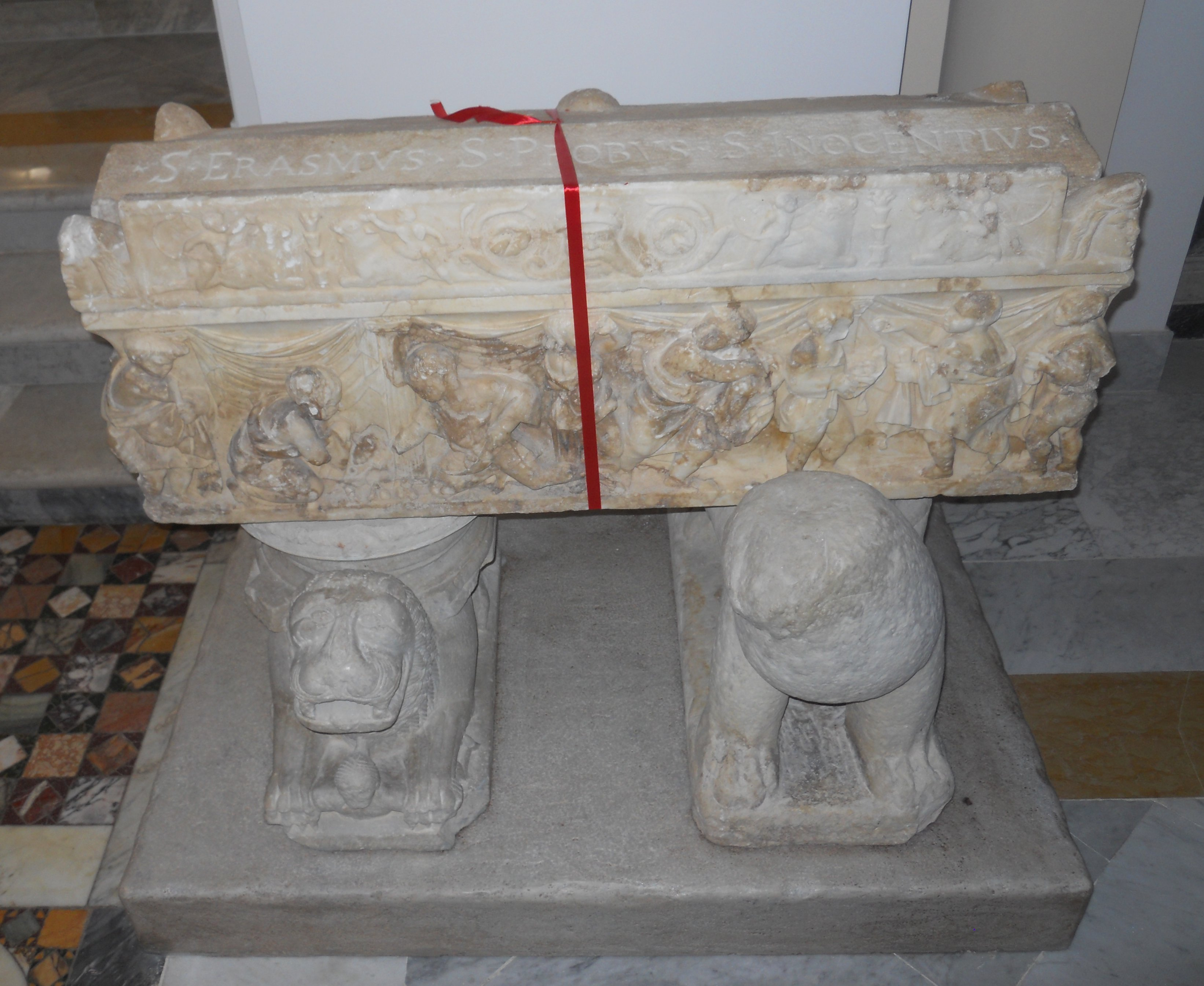
Sarcophagus of Saints Erasmus, Probus and Innocent.

In a forward position in the last bay of the nave are the ambon (on the left, flanked by the Easter candle column) and the baptismal font (on the right). The latter is made of copper and was carved out of the interior of a shallow marble puteal from the Roman period. The ambon consists of a wooden lectern painted in faux marble, with a circular base; on the front, it is decorated with a 13th-century marble sculpture, originally a pulpit decoration. It depicts a bearded man in an upright position, on whose head rests an eagle, and around whose body a serpent is clasped; at the figure's feet, possibly meant to represent the man's salvation, is a quadruped (a dog or lamb).

Under the arches connecting with the two side aisles are two ancient sarcophagi of modest size, made of marble. The one on the left contains the mortal remains of Saints Castus and Secondinus and St. Eupuria (the latter separated from the others by a wooden wall), as the inscription on the lid bears. The basin is strigilated on all sides; the other consists of a valuable infant sarcophagus, and houses the remains of Saints Erasmus, Probus and Innocent, whose names are inscribed above the lid. The basin is externally decorated with a bas-relief that runs on three sides and depicts a series of cupids (on the front side, they ride felines); at the corners, there are acroteria; the lid also has relief decoration, with the effigy of a male deity. Both sarcophagi were placed in 1620 inside the altar of the crypt together with that of St. Marcian; they each currently rest on a pair of stylophoric lions of which three (the two under the left sarcophagus and the one on the right under the other sarcophagus) date back to the 13th century and probably belong to the lost medieval ambon of the cathedral.

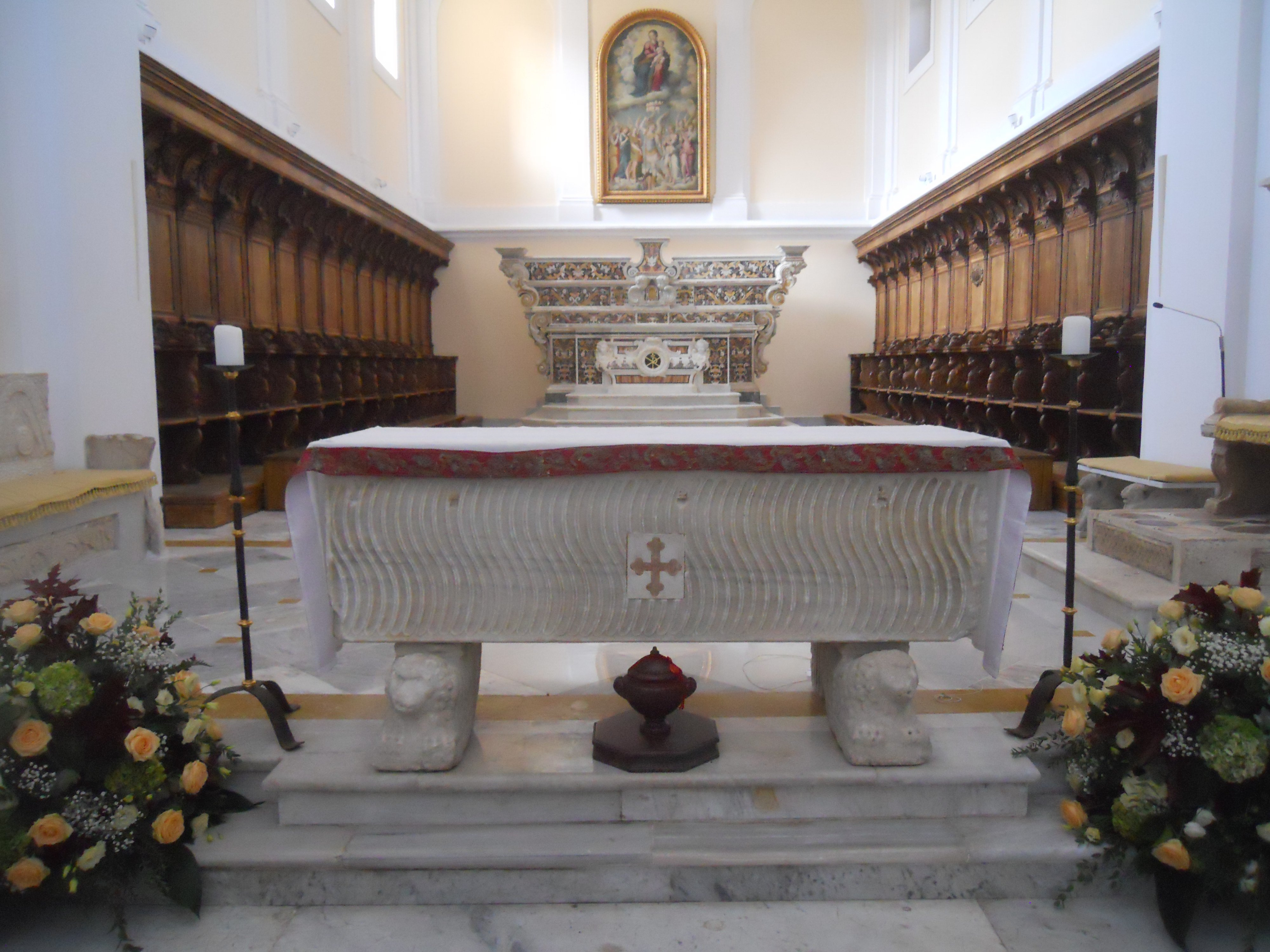
The high altar.

In the connecting bay between the nave and the apse, which is further raised by three steps, there is in a central position the high altar (surmounted in 2014–2018 by a crucifix painted and shaped by Giovanni da Gaeta, dating from around 1460s and coming from the former church of Santa Lucia in Gaeta). The altar was carved from the strigilated Roman sarcophagus that was placed in the 1620s inside the altar of the crypt and that enclosed the sarcophagi of Saints Erasmus, Probus and Innocent as well as Saint Marcianus; on the front, a seventeenth-century red marble cross, originally visible through an oval in the center of the antependium of the altar, while in the center of the rear is a modern bas-relief depicting the Lamb of God. The sarcophagus rests on two stylophoric lions, in the middle of which is placed a porphyry vase containing the relics.

Set back are the episcopal chair (on the left) and the presidential seat for celebrants other than the archbishop of Gaeta (on the right). The episcopal seat was made by Franco Vitelli by juxtaposing and integrating stone elements of different workmanship and age: among them a fragment of a pillar or jamb with double ogive knots (along the left side of the step), another with knotted circular mesh decoration (on the step, under the seat). The seat has on the front part of the seat a fragmentary cymatium from the church of San Giovanni a Mare (mid-9th century) decorated with four arches interspersed with lilies and bearing some animals as well as, in the center, a cross; the backrest, on the other hand, consists of a fragmentary slab with bas-relief three arches with pairs of peacocks alternately facing or opposing each other; two high-reliefs with angels (obtained by dismembering a single sculpture) make up the armrests. The cathedra is surmounted by a 15th-century bas-relief angel by Domenico Gagini, while on the wall above the seat are a fragment of an arched slab with a vine leaf motif and traces of polychromy, and a detached fresco from the former church of Santa Lucia depicting the Annunciation. The painting dates back to the late 14th century - early 15th century and is in poor condition; on the upper right, above the Archangel, God the Father is depicted from which emanates the ray of the Word "who is embodied in the child Jesus [...] within a sphere" and reaches the Virgin (the latter inserted within a soaring Gothic architecture) through the dove of the Holy Spirit.

Presbytery photos
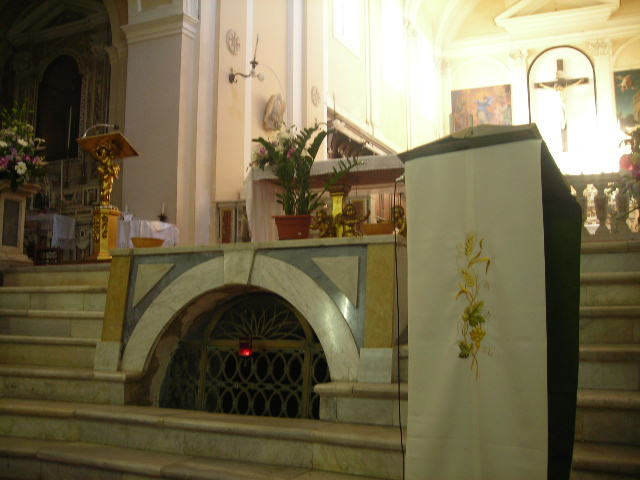
The presbytery in 2007

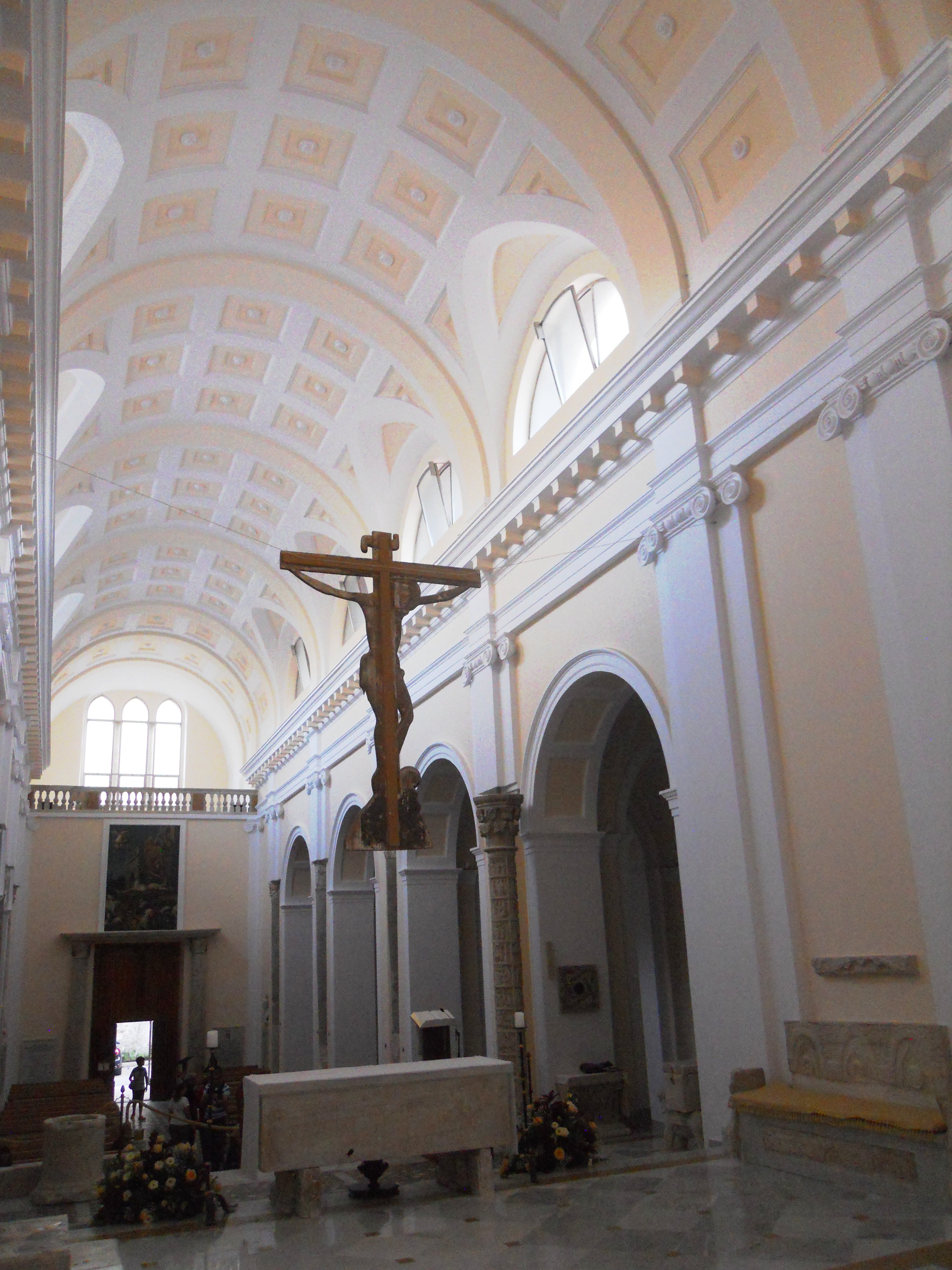
The chancel toward the counterfaçade

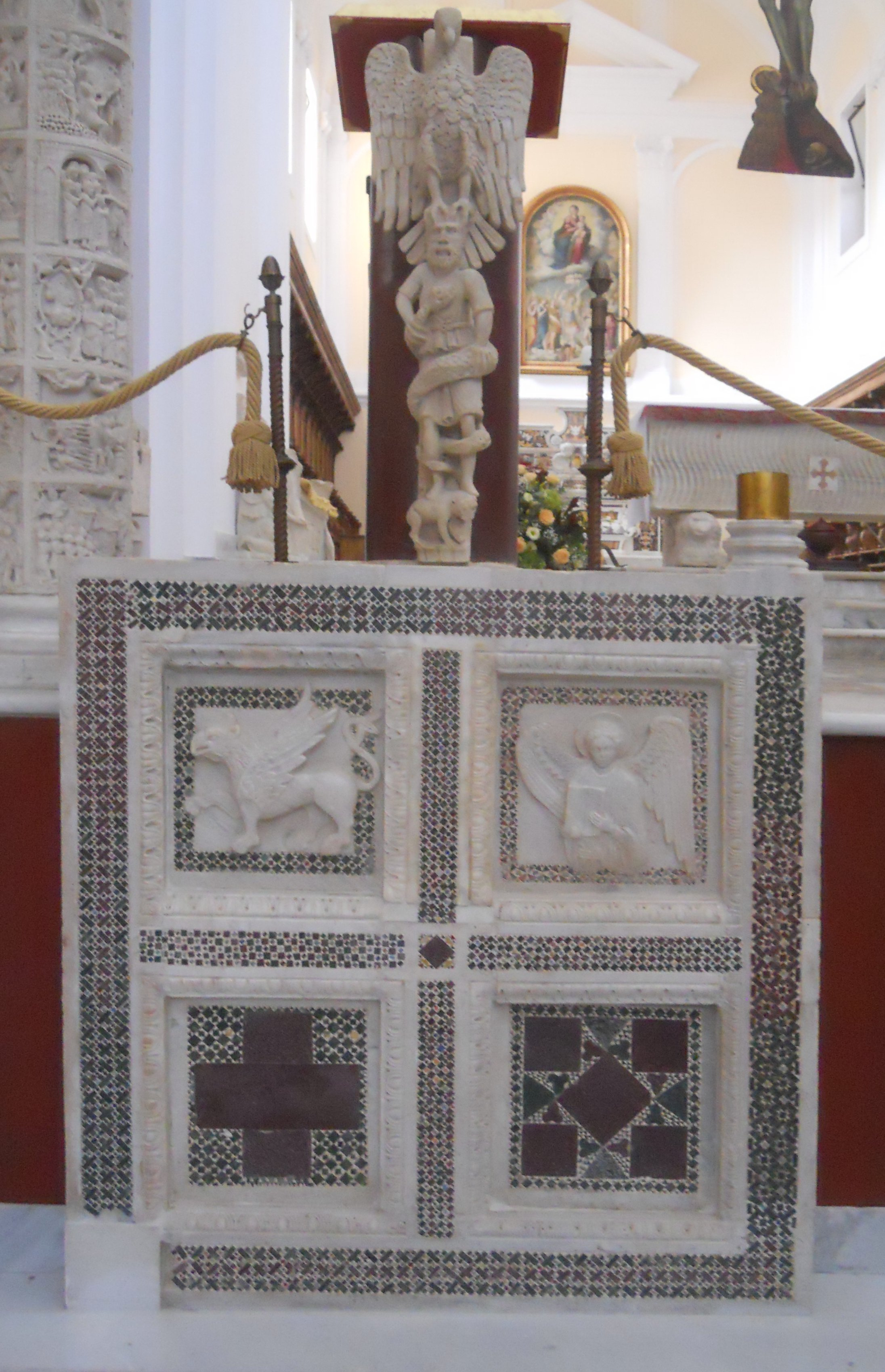
Left-hand screen and ambon

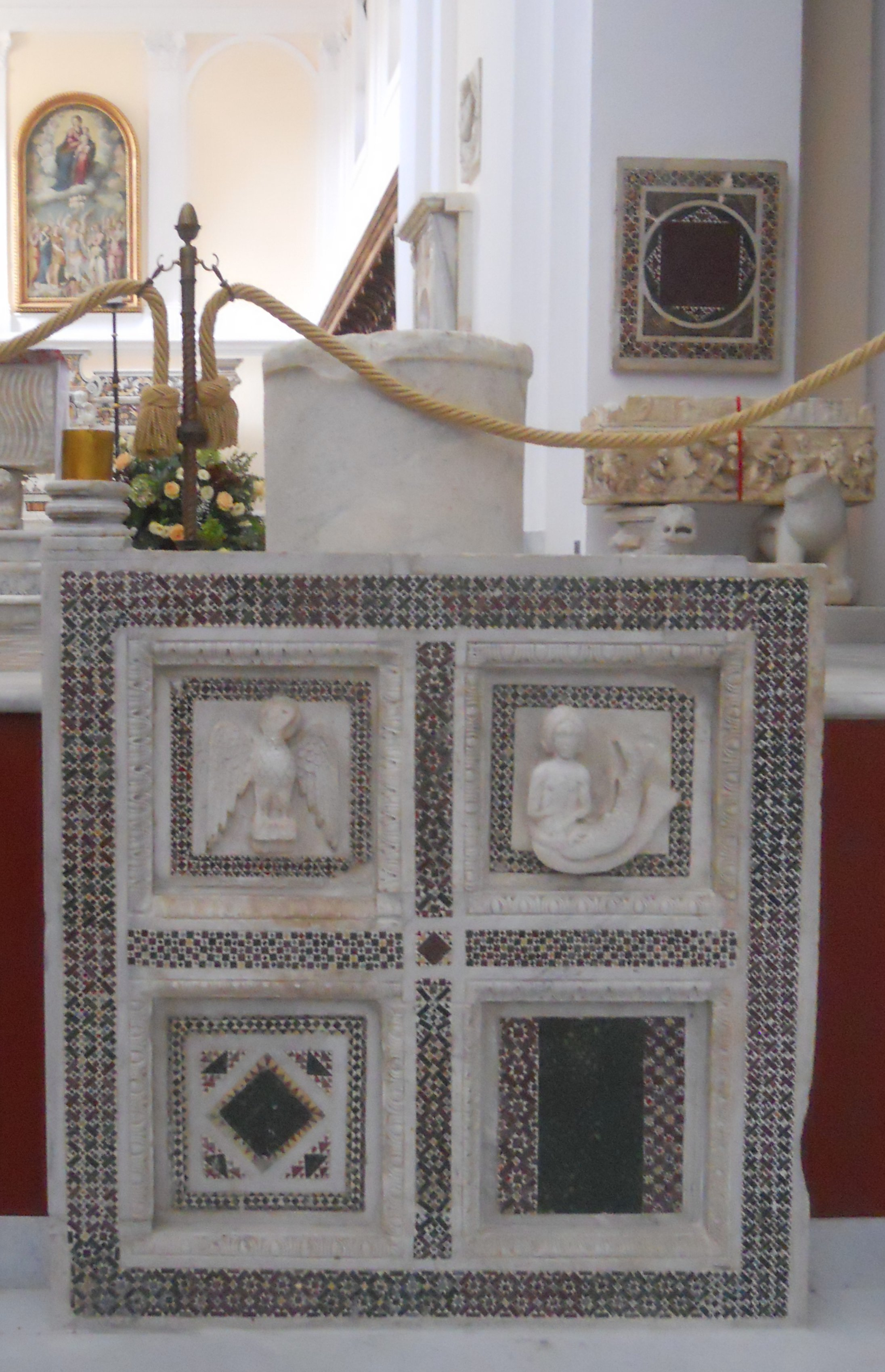
Right-hand screen and baptismal font

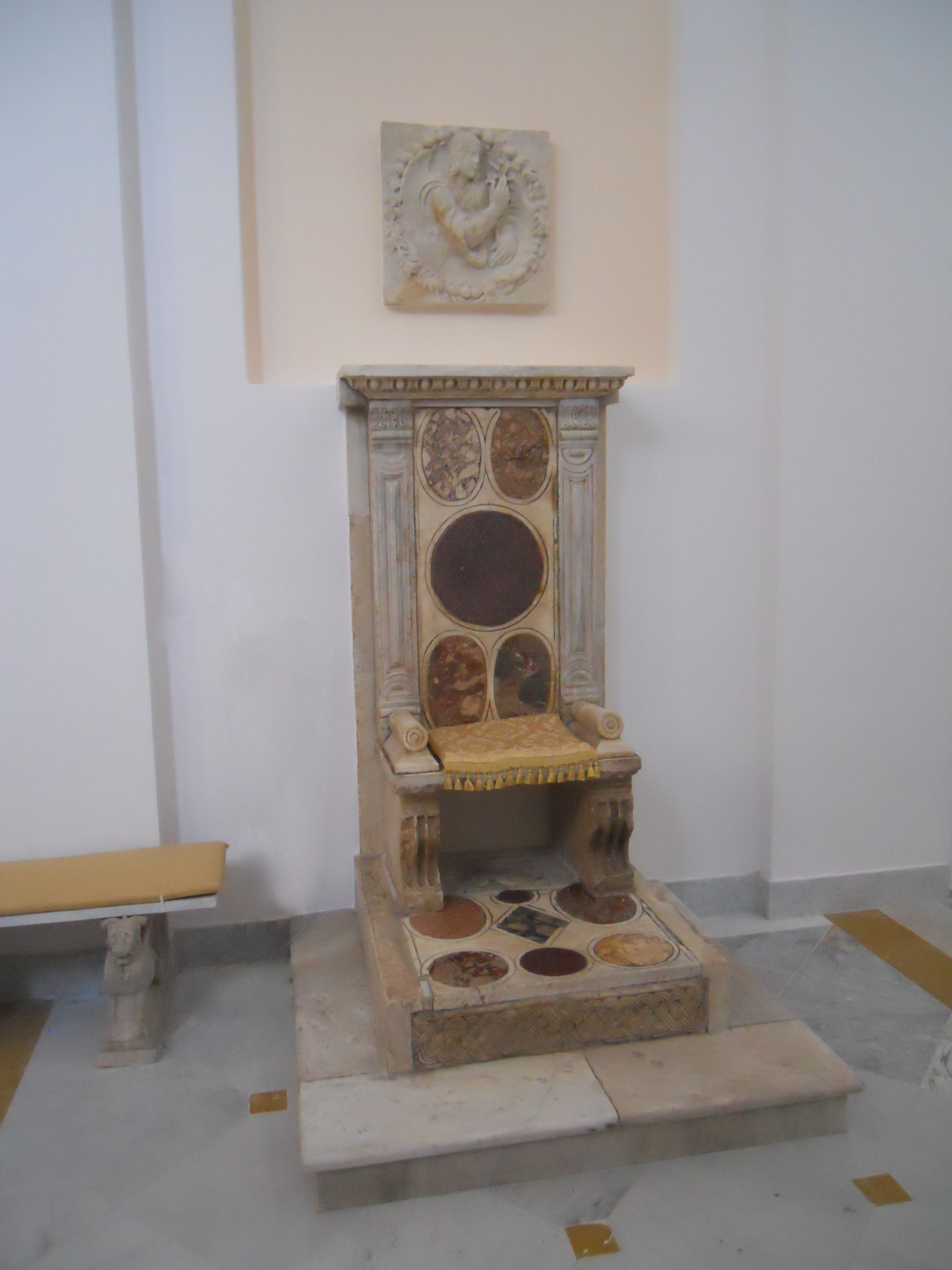
Chair and an Angel

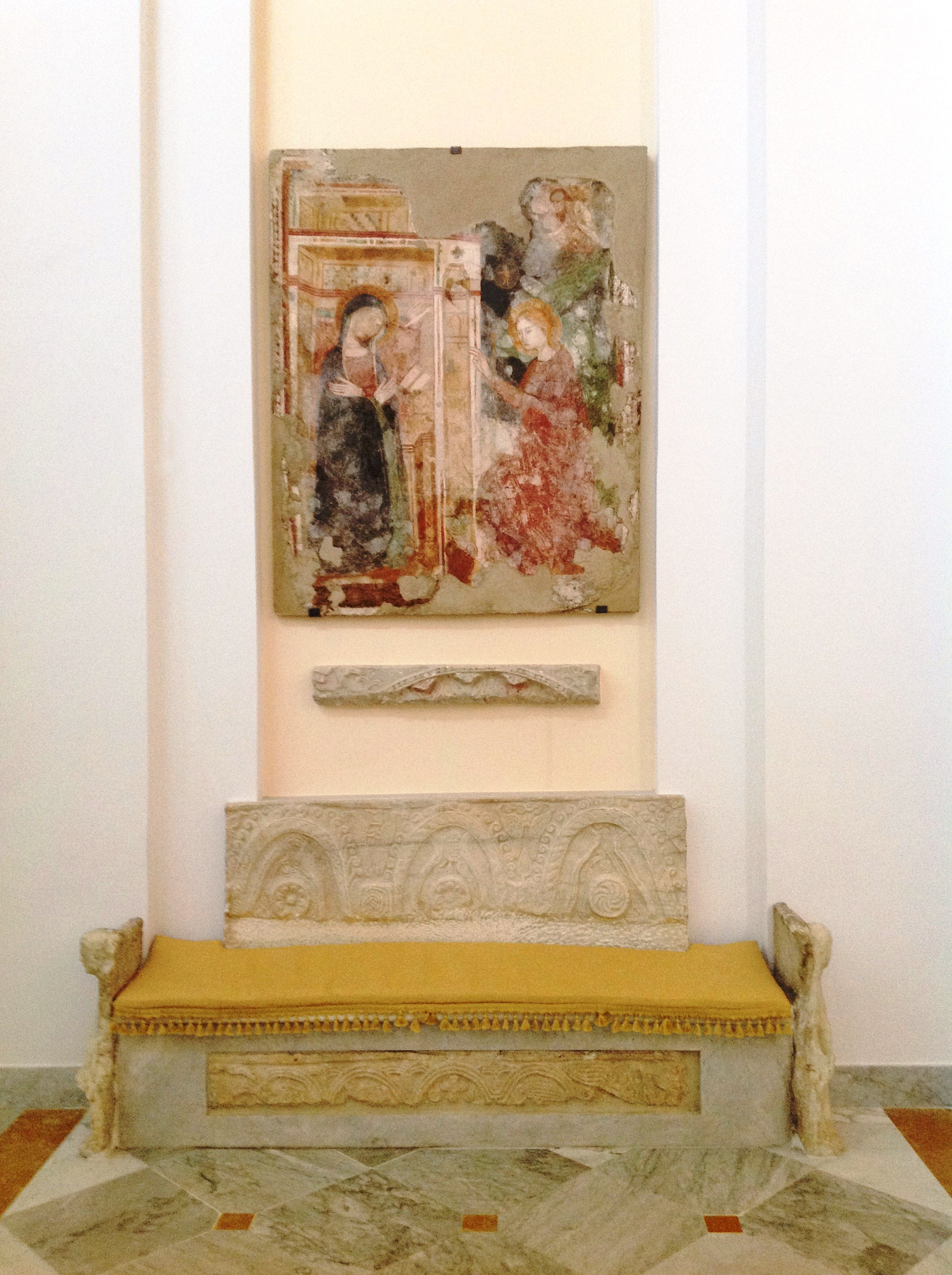
Seat and Annunciation

===== Column of the Easter candle =====
Easter candle photos
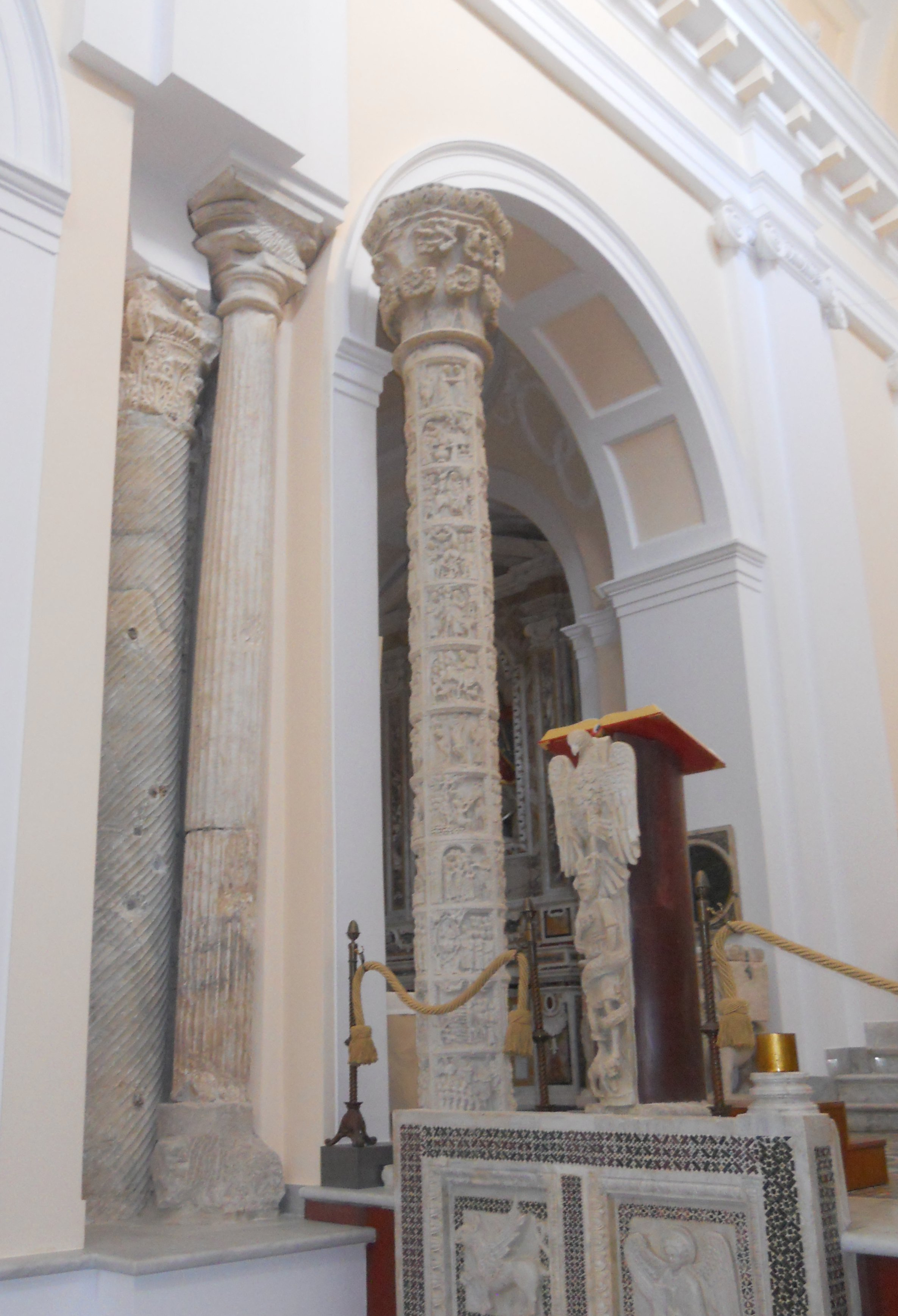
The ambon and the Easter candle column.

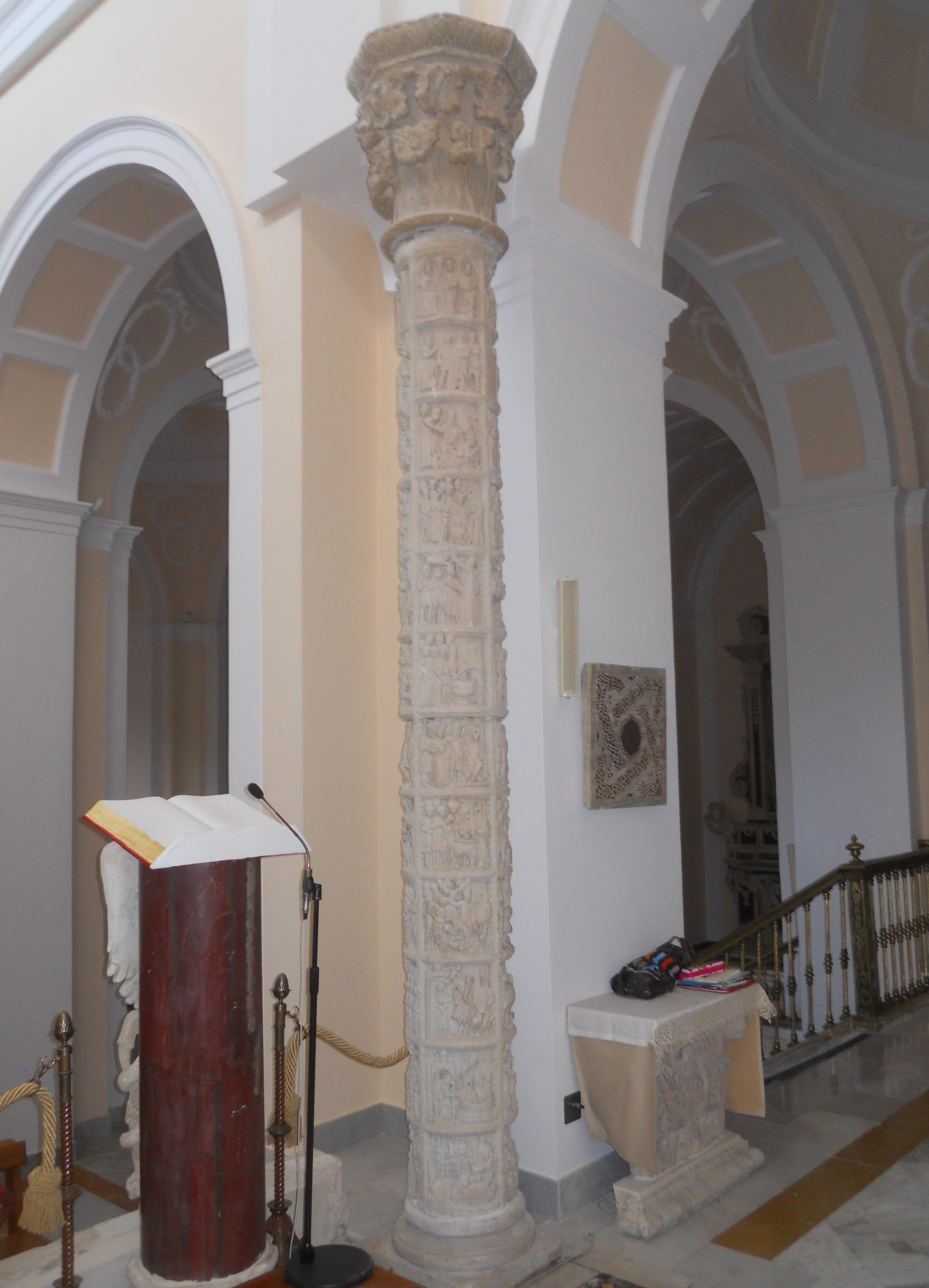
The Easter candle column as seen from the chancel.

To the left of the ambon is the valuable Easter candle column, dating from the 1270s. It had been kept inside the cathedral until the restoration work directed by Pietro Paolo Ferrara (1788–1792), when it was placed in the center of the churchyard, with the capital used as a base and a statuette depicting St. Erasmus on the top; later, starting in 1871, it had found its place inside a niche carved into the rock face in front of the church façade, protected by a gate. Following the construction of the neo-Gothic elevation, it was placed in the right bay of the atrium, resting on the currently dismembered group of four stylophoric lions in the pronaos; it was moved back inside the cathedral in 1920, under the second archway between the nave and the right aisle. Slightly damaged in the 1943 bombing, it was later restored; it assumed its current location during the 2008-2014 restorations. The work can be attributed to workers linked to the workshop of Pellegrino da Sessa and, due to the absence of decorative mosaic elements, is analogous to that in the basilica of St. Paul Outside the Walls in Rome (made by Pietro Vassalletto and Nicolò D'Angelo around 1170) and to that in the Palatine Chapel in Palermo (dating from around 1260–1280).

The column measures about 3.50 meters in height and is the work of an anonymous sculptor from Campania; scenes from the life of Jesus (having the Gospels as a source) and of St. Erasmus (based on Pope Gelasius II's Passio Erasmi, with ample space given to his episcopal ministry) are developed in parallel along the shaft on four side-by-side columns, tying them together typologically though without direct correspondence between the episodes. Each episode (there are 48 in total) is placed within a quadrangular field; the order is top to bottom and left to right. The top of the column is formed by the Corinthian capital (in which the Easter candle is inserted), decorated with acanthus and poppy leaves, rosettes and birds.

==== Apse ====
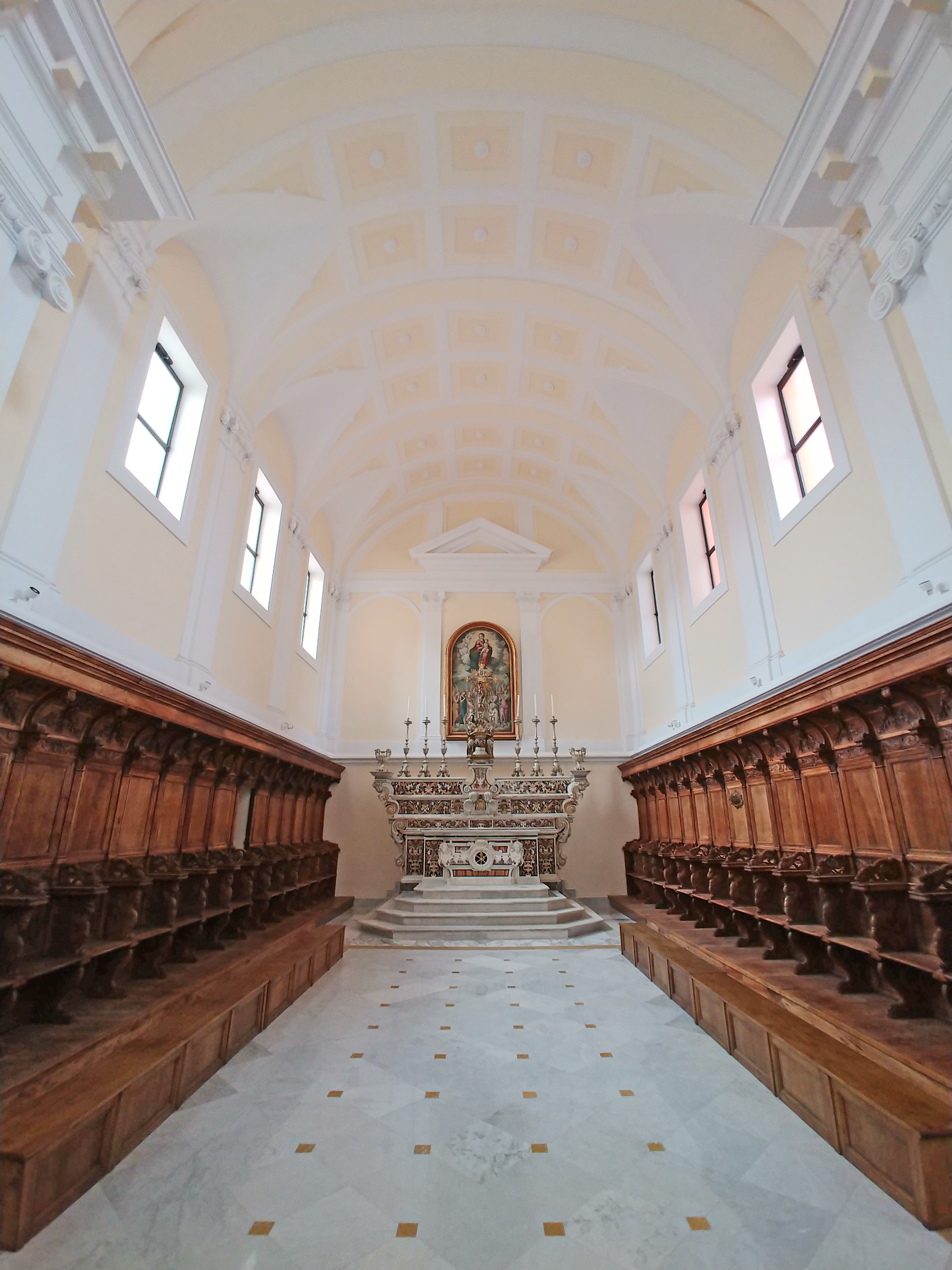
The apse.

The nave ends with the deep, rectangular-plan apse, remade in Baroque style to a design by Jacopo and Dionisio Lazzari in the first half of the 17th century of a structure from the end of the previous century; it is slightly wider than the nave and its barrel vault, lunettes and coffered ceiling, was built in 1775 and is lower than that of the nave, against the original plan that intended it to be higher. The room is illuminated by six large rectangular windows, three on each wall, interspersed with groups of smooth Corinthian pilasters in stucco.

The lower part of the side walls is occupied by the carved wooden stalls of the choir; these predate the apse and date from the first half of the 16th century; they were probably made for the old choir of the cathedral, or were originally in the sanctuary of the Santissima Annunziata or in the church of San Domenico. Partially damaged in 1943, they were later restored and reintegrated. The individual stalls are bordered by armrests richly carved with mythological figures, and relief decorations are also found on the backrest, particularly at the top.

The back wall of the apse, behind the lower portion of which rests the ancient Baroque high altar, is divided into three bays by pilasters: in the central one, until 1976, found its place the surviving part of the Lepanto Standard, the work of Girolamo Siciolante da Sermoneta, donated to the cathedral by Don John of Austria; the painting depicts Jesus crucified between Saints Peter and Paul and was kept first in the picture gallery of the Historic Cultural Center of Gaeta, then in the Diocesan Museum, where it is currently located. On the sides, however, were until 2008 Carlo Saraceni's Martyrdom of Saint Erasmus (on the left, currently above the main portal) and the Assumption of Mary, by Tommaso Macera (on the right, currently in the Gothic access room to the choir loft), a canvas made in 1983 to replace the similar one by Sebastiano Conca, painted in 1751 to replace an older one lost and destroyed during the bombings of World War II. With the 2008-2014 restorations, a panel painting, formerly in the capitular sacristy, depicting Madonna and Child with St. Michael the Archangel surrounded by a court of six angels, from the church of Sant'Angelo in Planciano, was placed in the center; dating from the 1560s, it has been mistakenly attributed to several artists, such as Bronzino, Andrea Sabbatini or Fabrizio Santafede, and later to the Sienese Marco dal Pino; its author, however, has been identified as Giovanni Filippo Criscuolo due to numerous similarities with other works by the artist: the Madonna and Child, which occupies the upper part of the painting, bears a remarkable resemblance to the Raphaelesque Madonna of Grace present in the church of Santa Maria della Mercede a Montecalvario in Naples, while in the lower register the figure of the archangel Michael, on whose sides six angels are symmetrically arranged, recalls the similar one present in the center, below, of the Last Judgment attributed to Criscuolo and currently at the Bob Jones University campus in Greenville, South Carolina. The painting is the result of a reworking in a Mannerist perspective of traditional figural forms typical of Andrea Sabbatini (active in Gaeta in the decades before, at the same time as Criscuolo) with references to the painting of Raphael Sanzio, whose Alba Madonna replica was probably found in the city and sold in the 19th century.

Apse photos
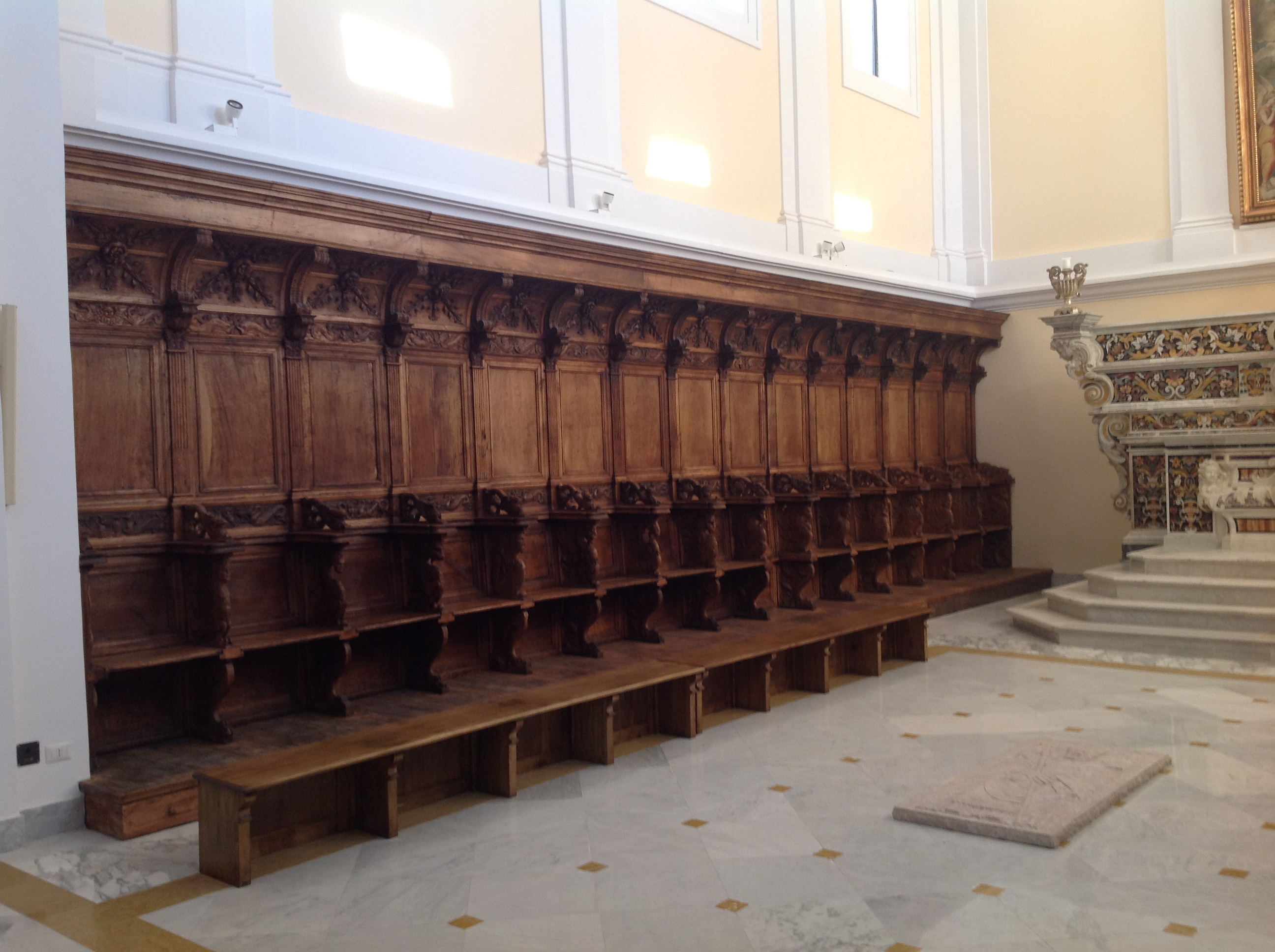
Left choir stalls

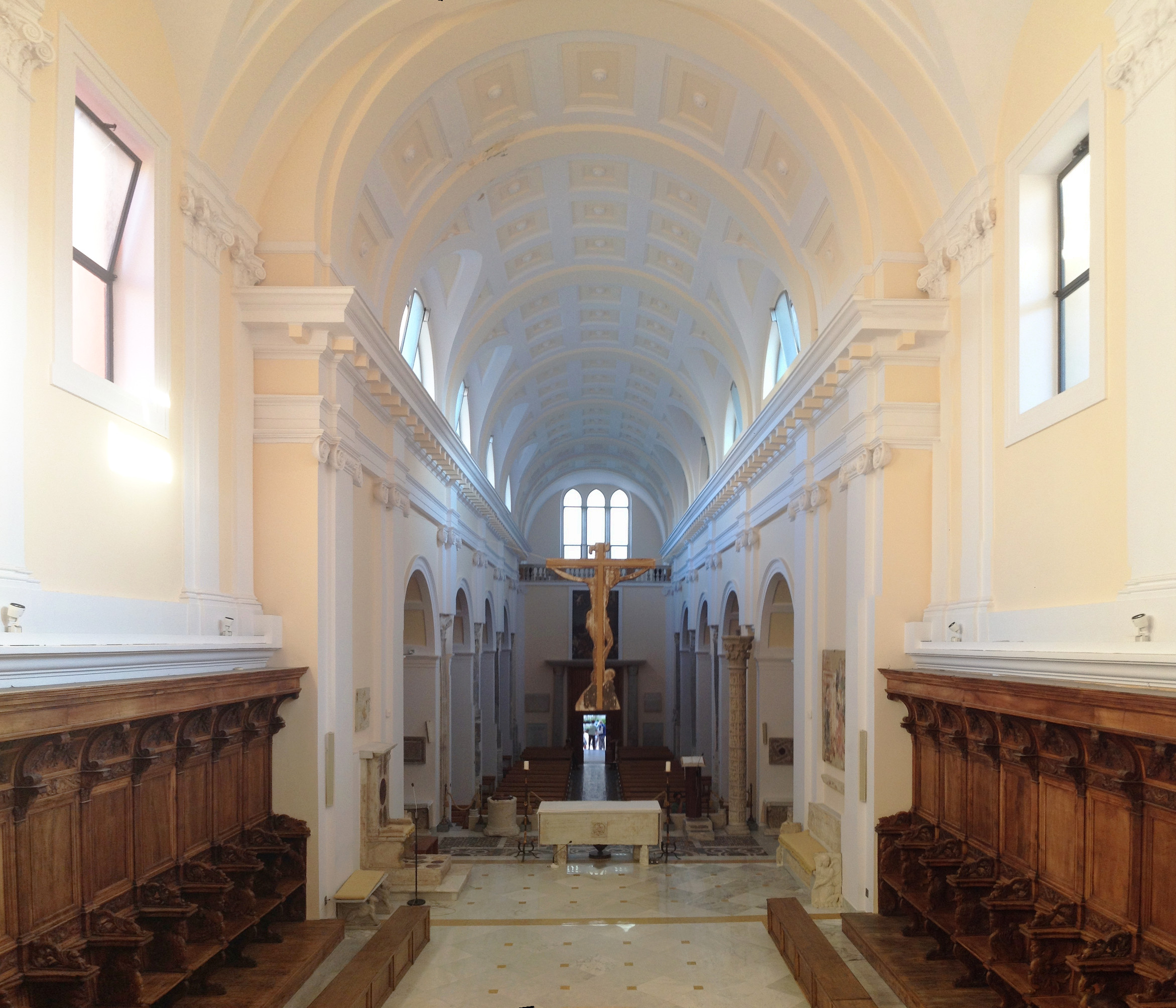
The apse toward the counterfaçade

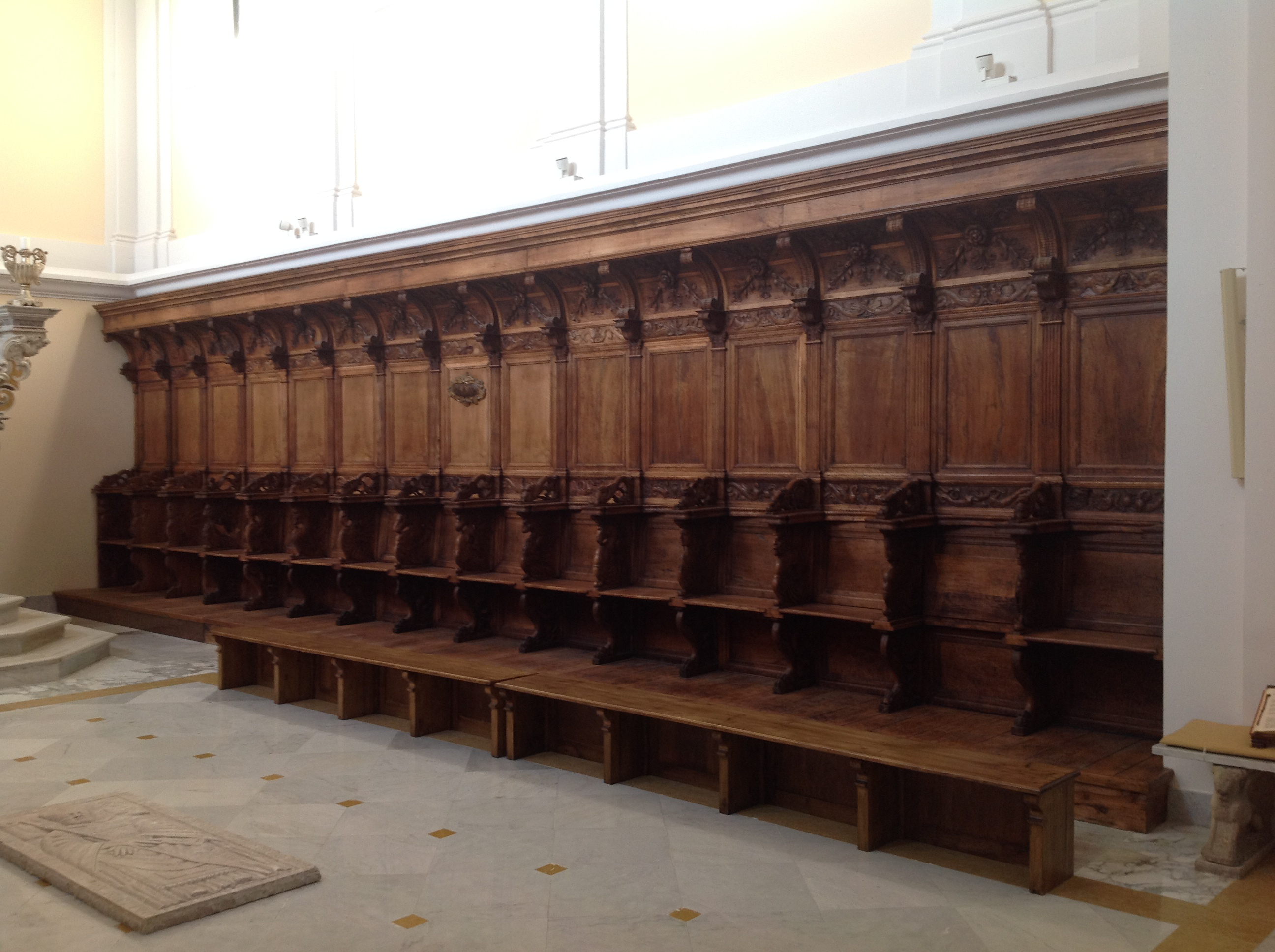
Right choir stalls

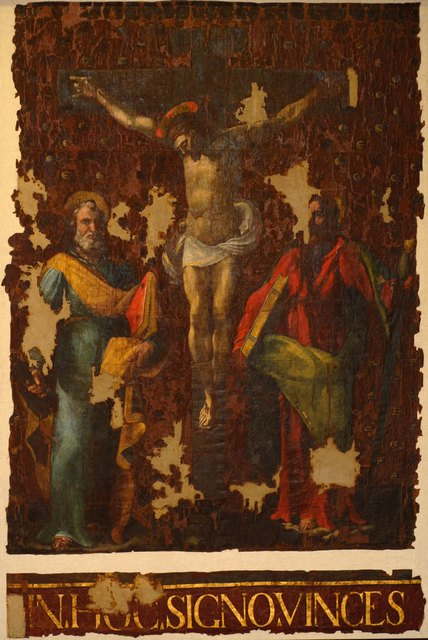
Girolamo Siciolante da Sermoneta, Standard of Lepanto

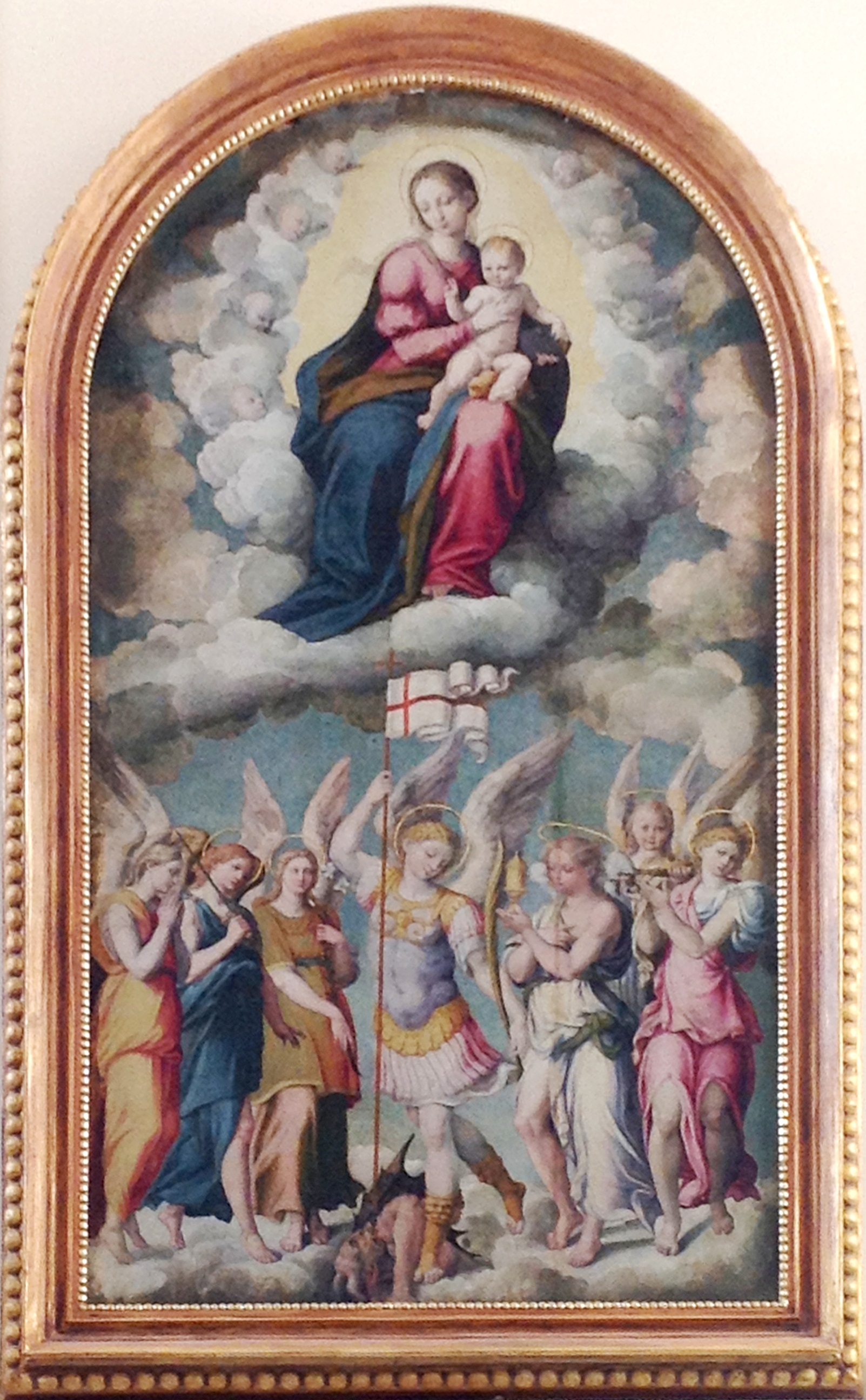
Giovanni Filippo Criscuolo, Madonna and Child with St. Michael the Archangel and Angels

===== Altar of the apse =====
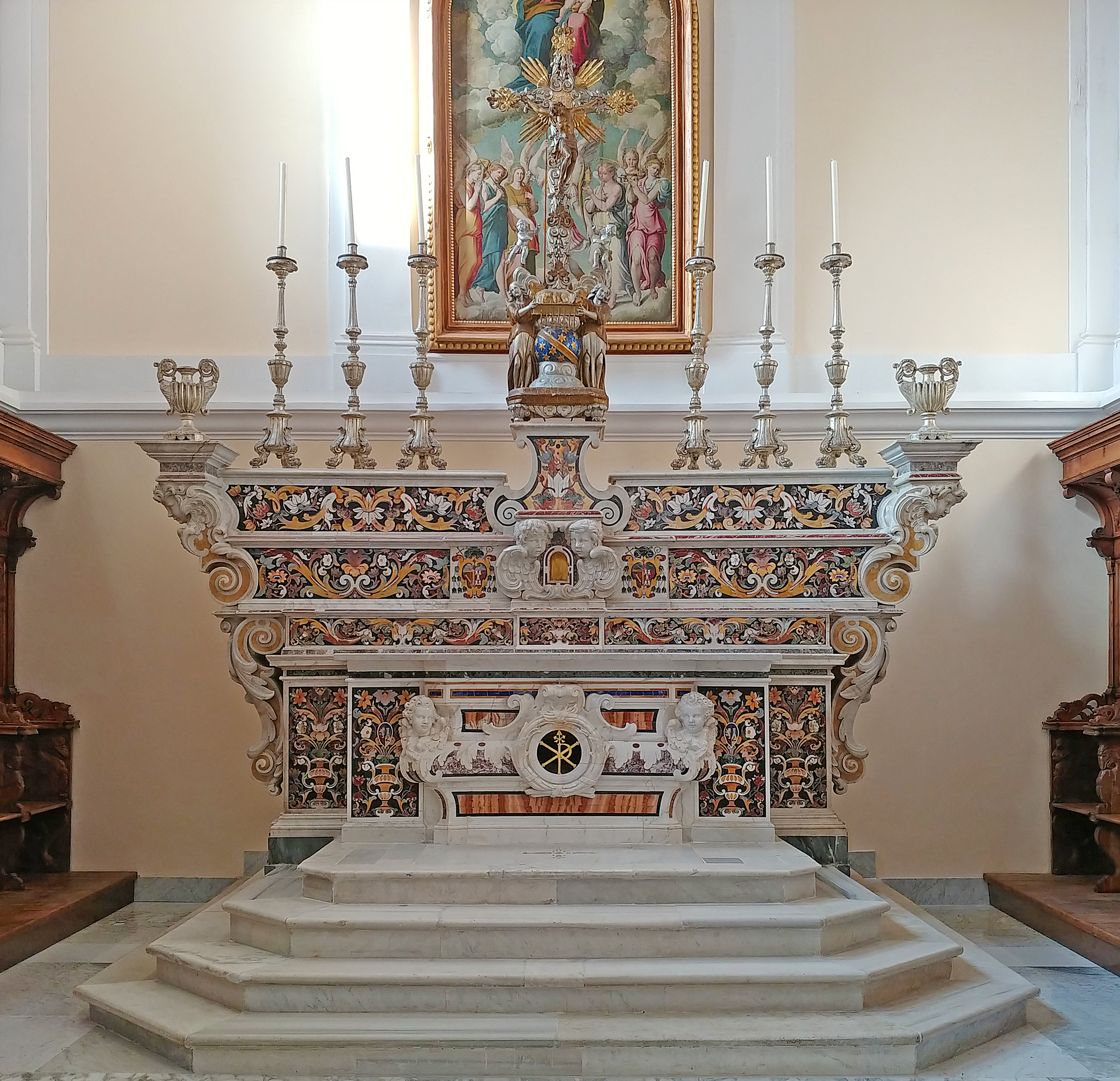
The baroque apse altar in polychrome marble.

Close to the back wall of the apse and slightly detached from it is the valuable ancient high altar in polychrome marble, the work of Dionisio Lazzari, who made it between 1670 and 1683; in 1710 the tabernacle was made.

The altar was originally below the apsidal arch, and probably in place of its present location were the central seats of the wooden choir. It was set back to its present position at the behest of canon and vicar general Giuseppe Iannitti between 1785 and 1792 and raised one step to increase its visibility from the nave. Due to the bombing of 1943, the central section of the antependium was almost completely lost, which was no longer the original one, but a 1786 remake in late Baroque style to allow the veneration, through an oculus, of the remains of St. Albina; one in simpler forms was then made, with a red and white marble urn in relief on a green background. During the 2008-2014 restorations that part of the altar was removed and replaced by a faithful copy of the 18th-century antependium, of which the surviving elements were reused.

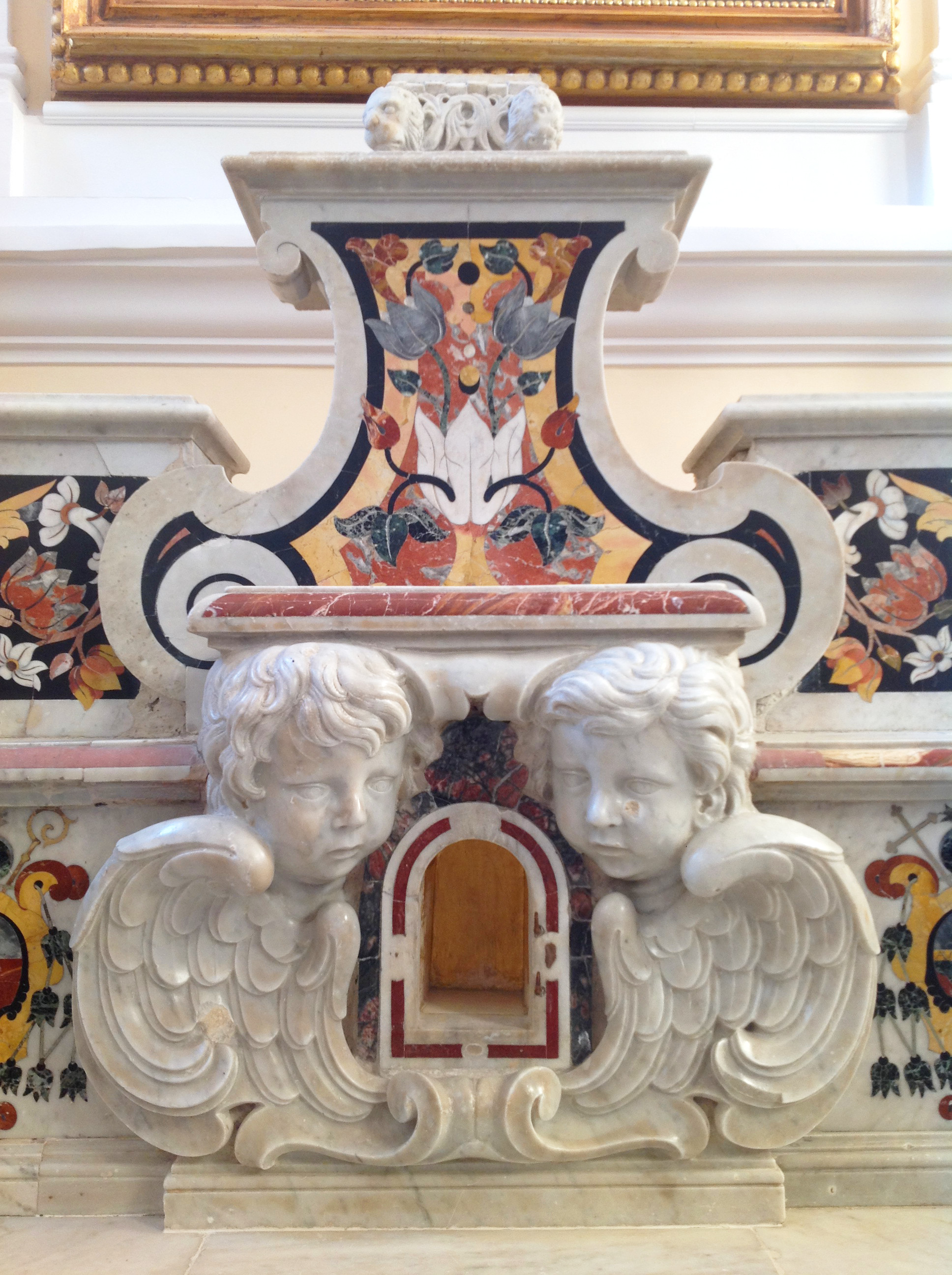
The 18th-century tabernacle with the two corbels.

The altar is raised four steps above the floor level of the apse; an epigraph dated 1683 in Latin (already abutting the rear wall of the artifact before its relocation to the back of the apse) is walled on the topmost one, reporting the tradition that the Baroque altar was built by incorporating the wooden one consecrated by Pope Paschal II in 1106. In the center of the antependium is a circular oculus, the frame of which is surmounted by volutes and decorated with a plant motif in relief, through which one can see the marble urn housing the mortal remains of St. Albina, placed below the mensa. On either side of the opening and set apart from it are two angel heads, of which one is original and the other reconstructed. The two side fields of the antependium, on the other hand, date back to the 17th century and echo the style of the rest of the altar, with rich inlaid decoration in polychrome marble and mother-of-pearl depicting plant elements, floral cups and scrolls, which also continues on the three steps of the riser. The 18th-century tabernacle features, on the front, two angels in high relief framing the small door, on either side of which is twice inlaid the coat of arms of the commissioning bishop José Guerrero de Torres, O.E.S.A. Above the tabernacle are two corbels: on the lower one was placed the silver statue of St. Erasmus on the occasion of the patron's feast day (dating back to the 14th century and several times modified and enriched, stolen in 1981); on the upper one, considerably elevated, is the valuable monumental Crucifix in gilded and silver-plated wood, coeval with the altar and also probably the work of Dionisio Lazzari; the sculpture presents Christ hanging from an elaborate cross resting on a high base with a globe and flanked by two cherubs. On the lower volutes placed at either end of the altar to support the two upper steps of the riser (each of which is surmounted by a similar element terminating in an angel's head), are the inlaid coats of arms of bishops Lorenzo Mayers Caramuel, O. de M. (right) and Martino Ibáñez y Villanueva (left). In the city of Gaeta there are two altars in polychrome marble similar to the one in the cathedral in style and decoration, also made by Dionisio Lazzari and originally equipped with their own monumental wooden crucifix: the one in the sanctuary of the Santissima Annunziata (1673, with antependium remade in the 19th century) and the one in the church of Santa Maria di Porto Salvo (1675, extensively remodeled but with its original antependium).

Altar of the apse photos
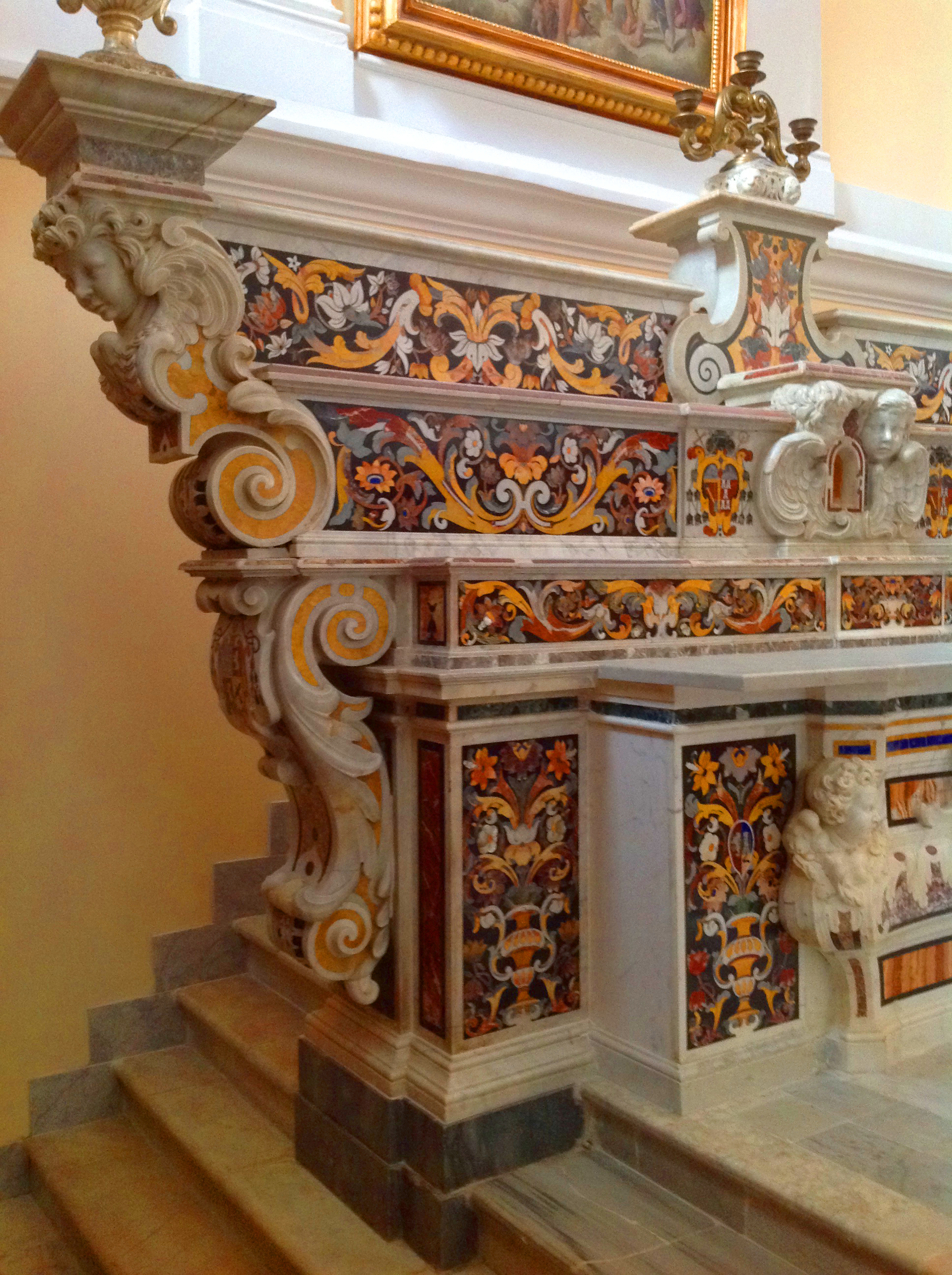
Detail

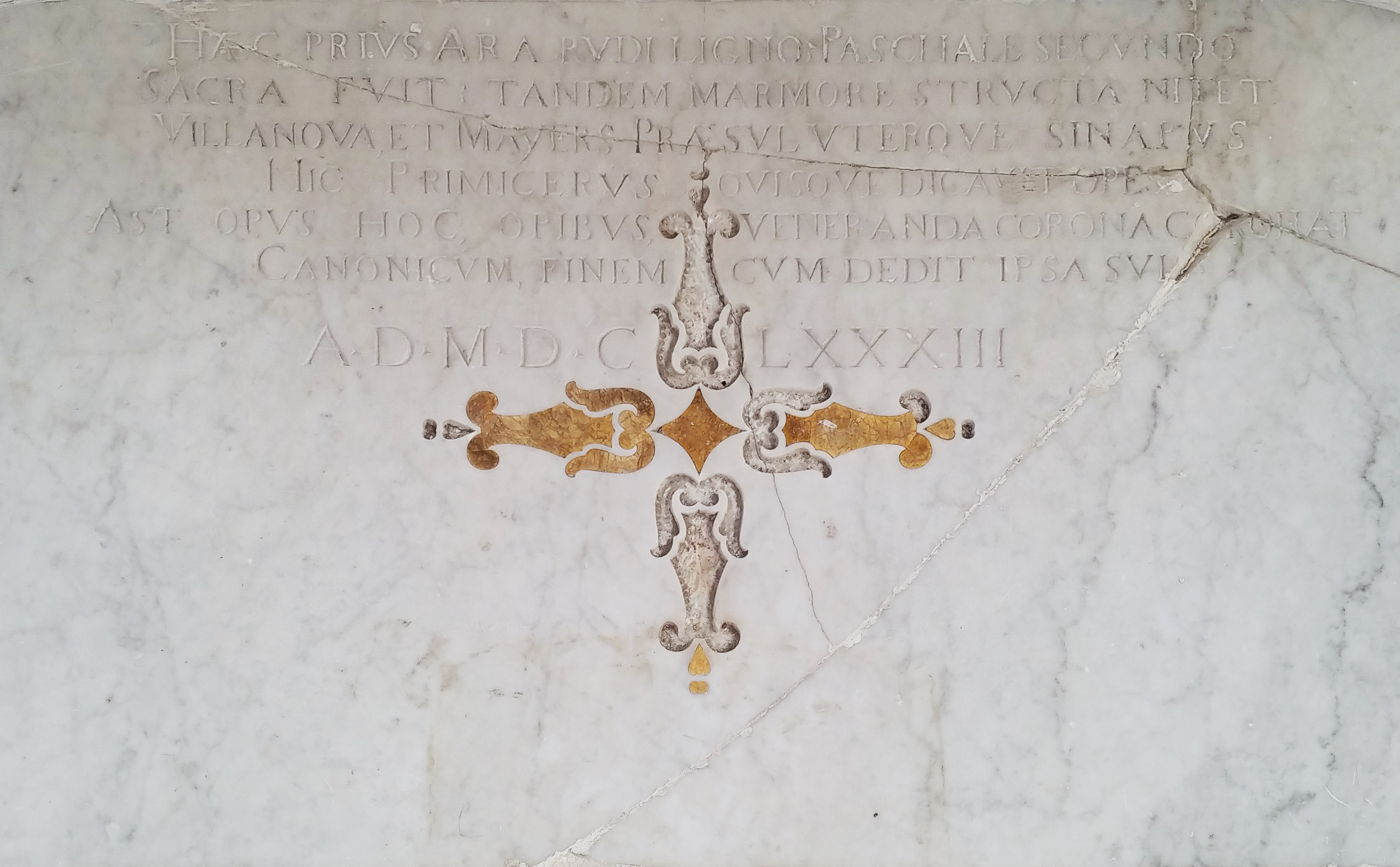
The 1683 epigraph

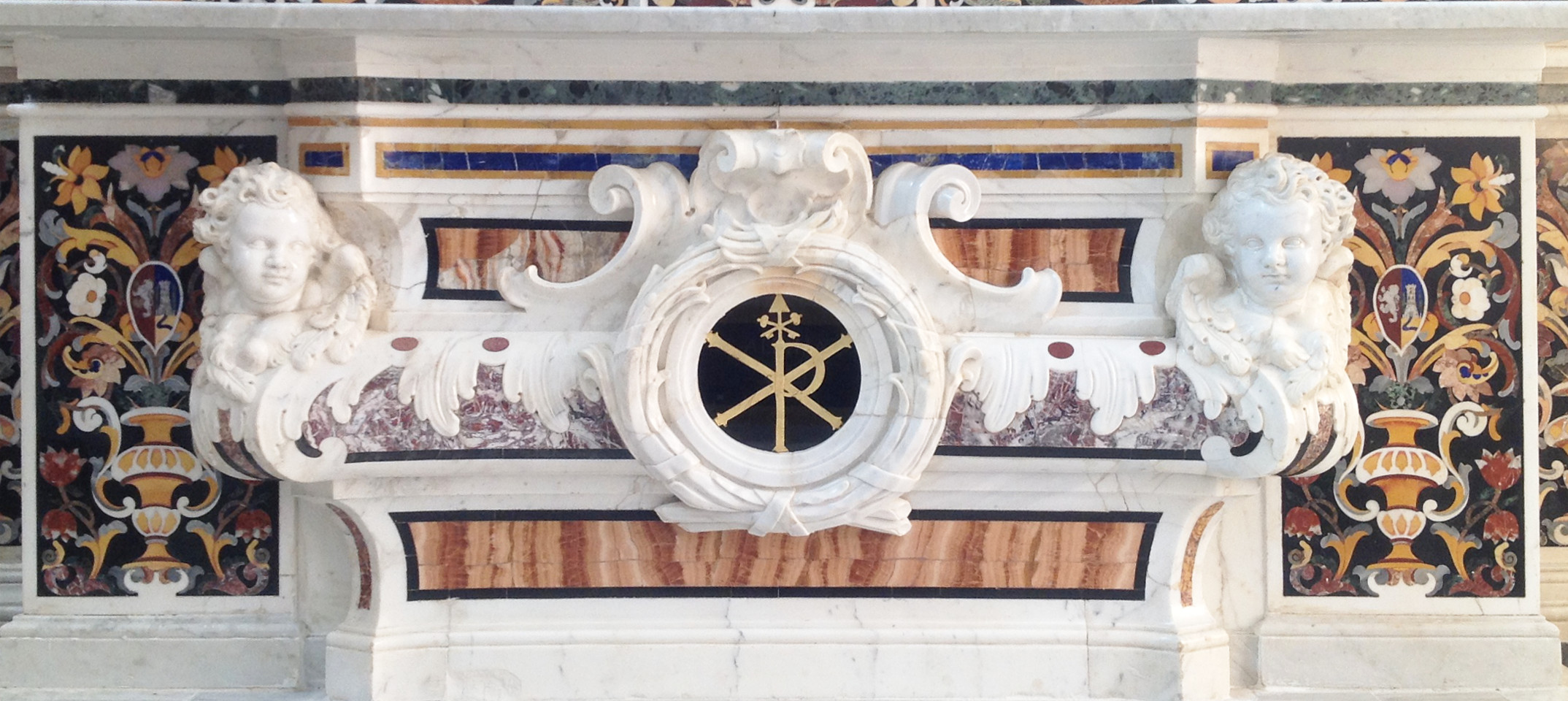
The antependium

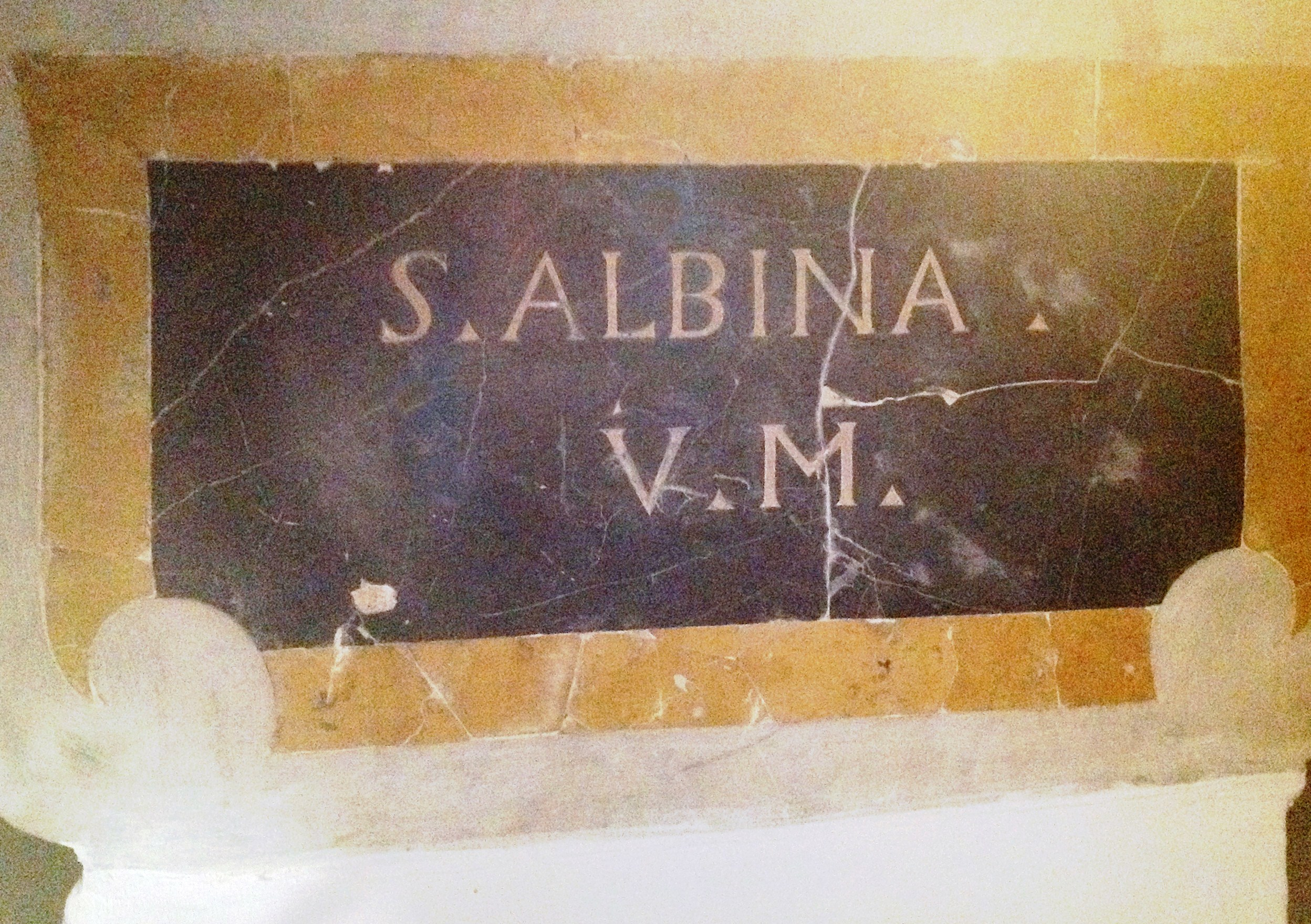
The urn with the remains of St. Albina

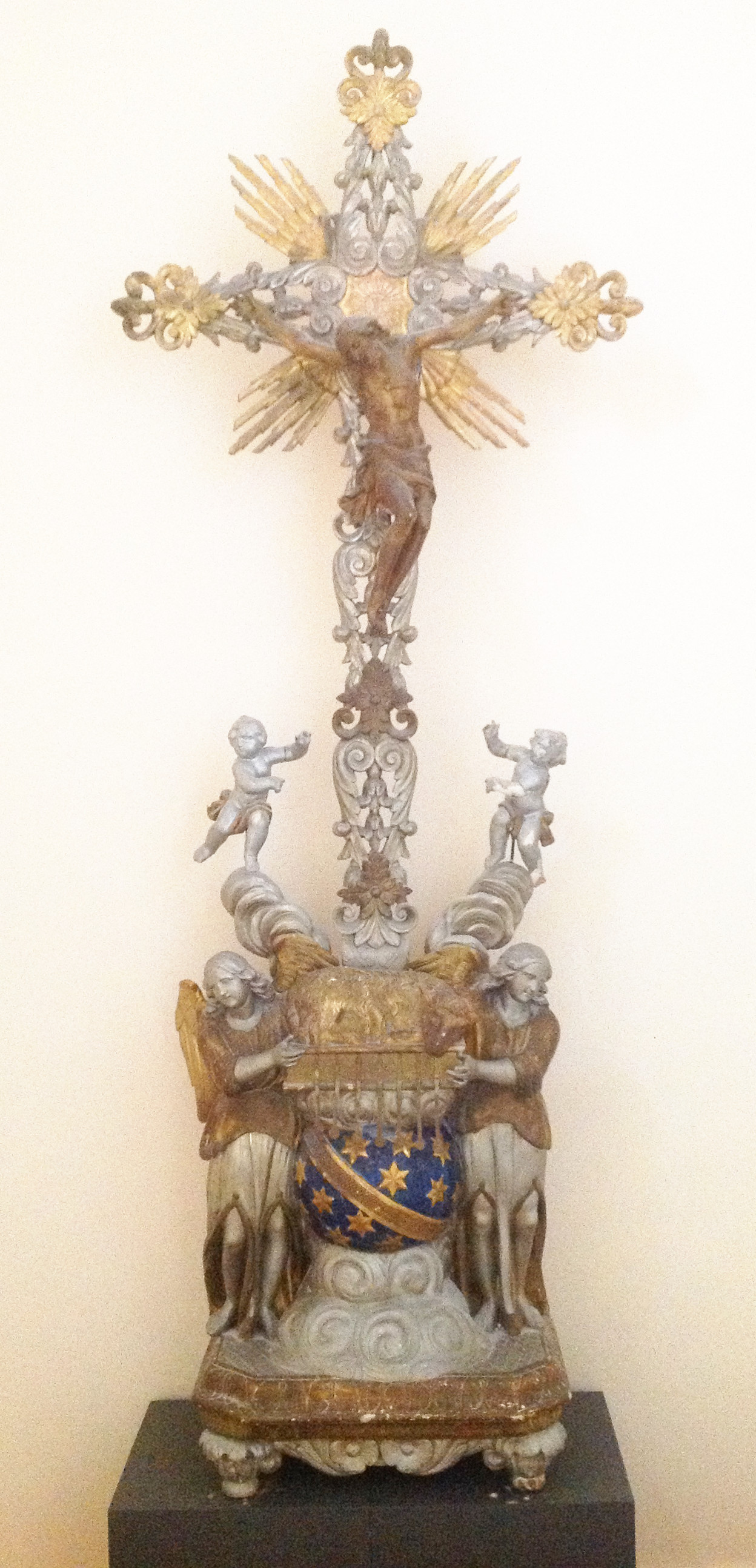
The monumental crucifix

==== Crypt ====
Below the apse is the crypt, built between 1584 and 1607 and rebuilt from 1619 onwards to a design by Jacopo Lazzari first and his son Dionisio later.

Access to the room is via a double staircase, the work of Dionisio Lazzari and completed in 1689; this connects the entrance of the crypt to the two side aisles of the cathedral. In the lower part of the walls, there is an inlaid two-colored marble band that imitates a balustrade; the remaining part, like the vault, is decorated with Baroque stucco. The two ramps rejoin in front of the chapel's entrance arch, where there is a plaque placed in 1666 as thanksgiving to St. Erasmus by the people of Gaeta for their escape from danger during the plague of 1656.

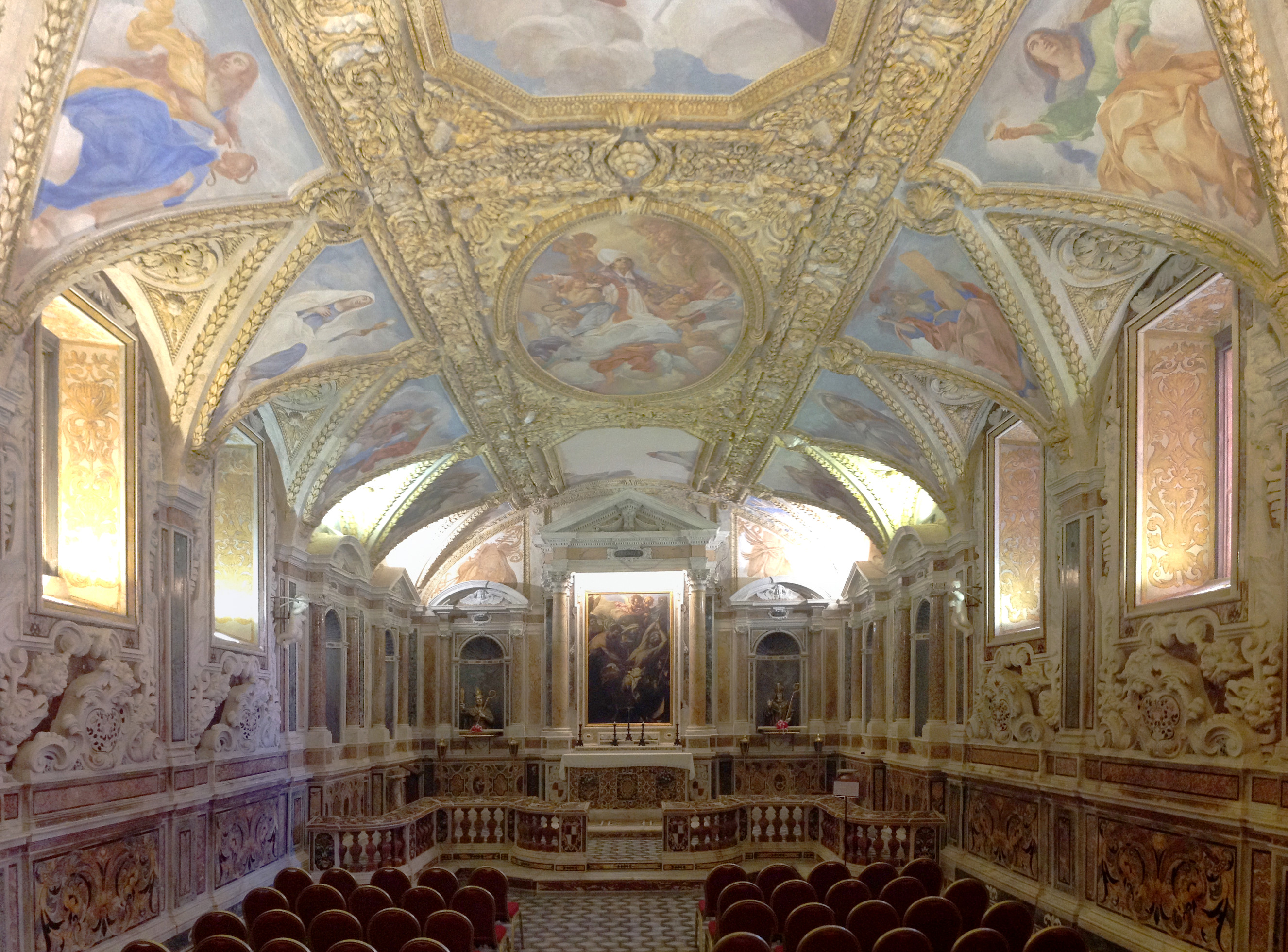
Interior of the crypt toward the altar.

The crypt is closed by a monumental bronze gate made between 1700 and 1701 by the Neapolitan silversmith Antonio Perrella, inspired by that of Cosimo Fanzago in the chapel of the treasure of St. Januarius in Naples Cathedral. On it are depicted the coat of arms of the city of Gaeta and, above the door, the two-faced bust of St. Erasmus.

The chapel consists of a single nave covered with a lowered lunetted barrel vault, ending in a flat wall; the room is lit by six rectangular windows, three on each of the two side walls. The white, gray and black marble floor, with geometric decoration, was made by Giuseppe Gallo. The walls are decorated with elaborate polychrome marble cladding, the work of Dionisio Lazzari, in the lower part in marquetry and in the upper part embossed.

The oil paintings adorning the vault, set within an apparatus of stucco frames, are the work of Giacinto Brandi, who created them between 1662 and 1664; out of the three central ones, God the Father with cherubs (above the chancel) and Glory of St. Erasmus (in the center) were largely lost due to the bombing in 1943 (the latter was rebuilt in 2015); Glory of Saints Albina, Eupuria, Casto, Innocent, Marcianus, Probus and Secondinus, however, remains intact. The webs, on the other hand, depict the Virtues: on the right Divinity, Wisdom, Fortitude, Humility and Penance; on the left Modesty, Prudence, Faith, Charity and Eternity.

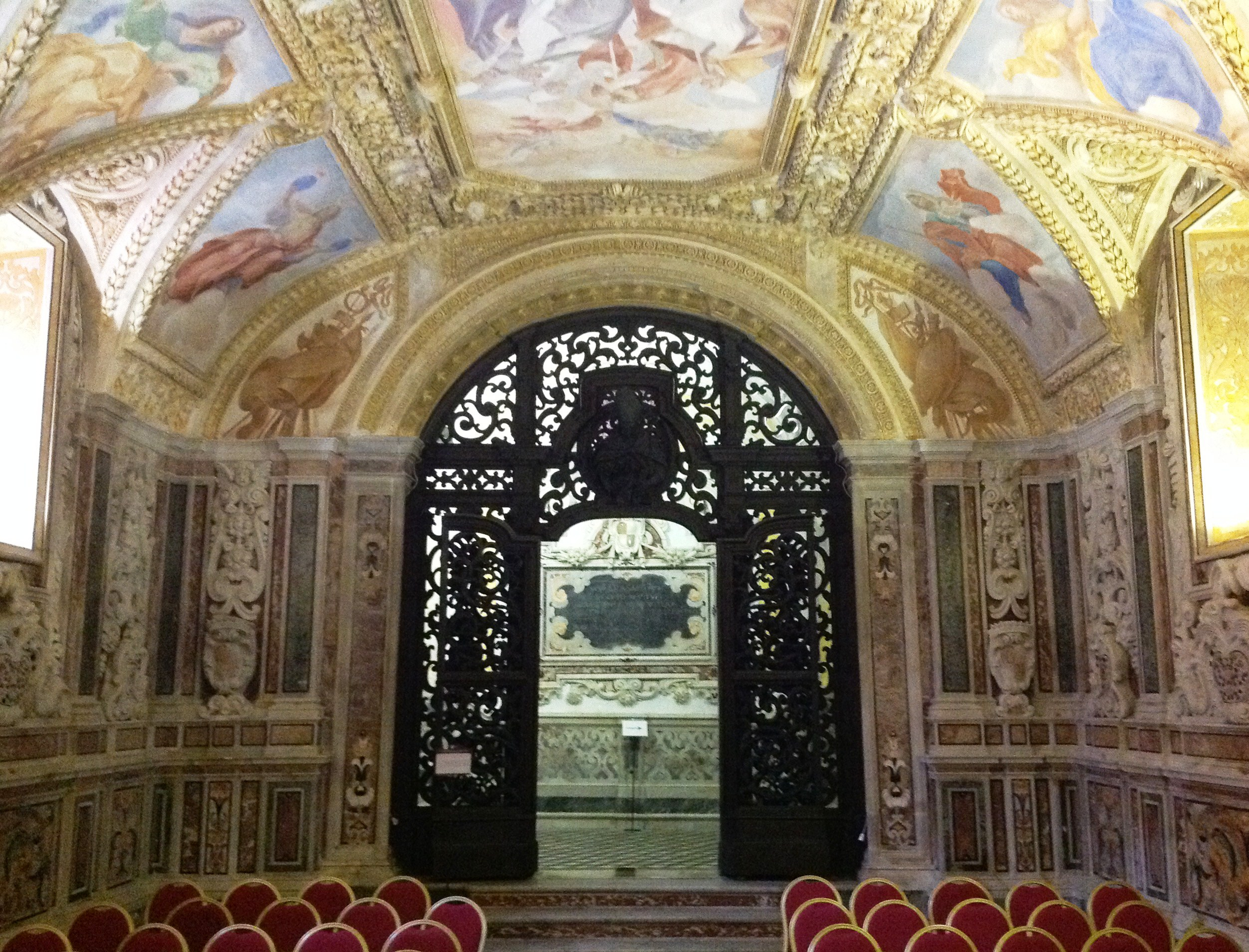
Interior of the crypt toward the entrance.

The chancel, raised one step above the rest of the church, is bordered by a polychrome marble balustrade decorated with inlay, the work of Dionisio Lazzari; the coat of arms of the city of Gaeta is on it. Also by the same artist is the decorative apparatus of the walls: there are inlaid marbles in the lower part, and six niches in the upper part, each surmounted by a tympanum supported by two Corinthian columns; these originally housed the silver statues of the saints (from left) Albina, Castus, Marcianus, Innocent, Secondinus and Eupuria, whose mortal remains, along with those of St. Erasmus, were placed under the altar, in three small sarcophagi contained in a larger strigilated one, removed from its original location during the 2008 canonical survey and later refitted as a high altar during the 2008-2014 restorations. The statues (with the exception of the statue of St. Marcian) were requisitioned in 1798 by the government of the Kingdom of Naples along with the silver antependium with the Transfer of the Relics of St. Erasmus from Formia to Gaeta (1749), and in their place were placed wooden busts of four Apostles and St. Januarius in 1971; currently, in the two niches closest to the altar, are two bronze busts-reliquaries of St. Erasmus (on the right) and St. Marcianus (on the left, at the foot of which is the ancient sarcophagus with the saint's mortal remains), made in 2008.

The altar has an antependium richly decorated with inlaid marble made by Dionisio Lazzari in 1670 in place of the original one; the altarpiece consists of a triangular tympanum supported by two smooth Corinthian columns. In the center is the altarpiece Martyrdom of Saint Erasmus by Giacinto Brandi (1664).

Crypt photos
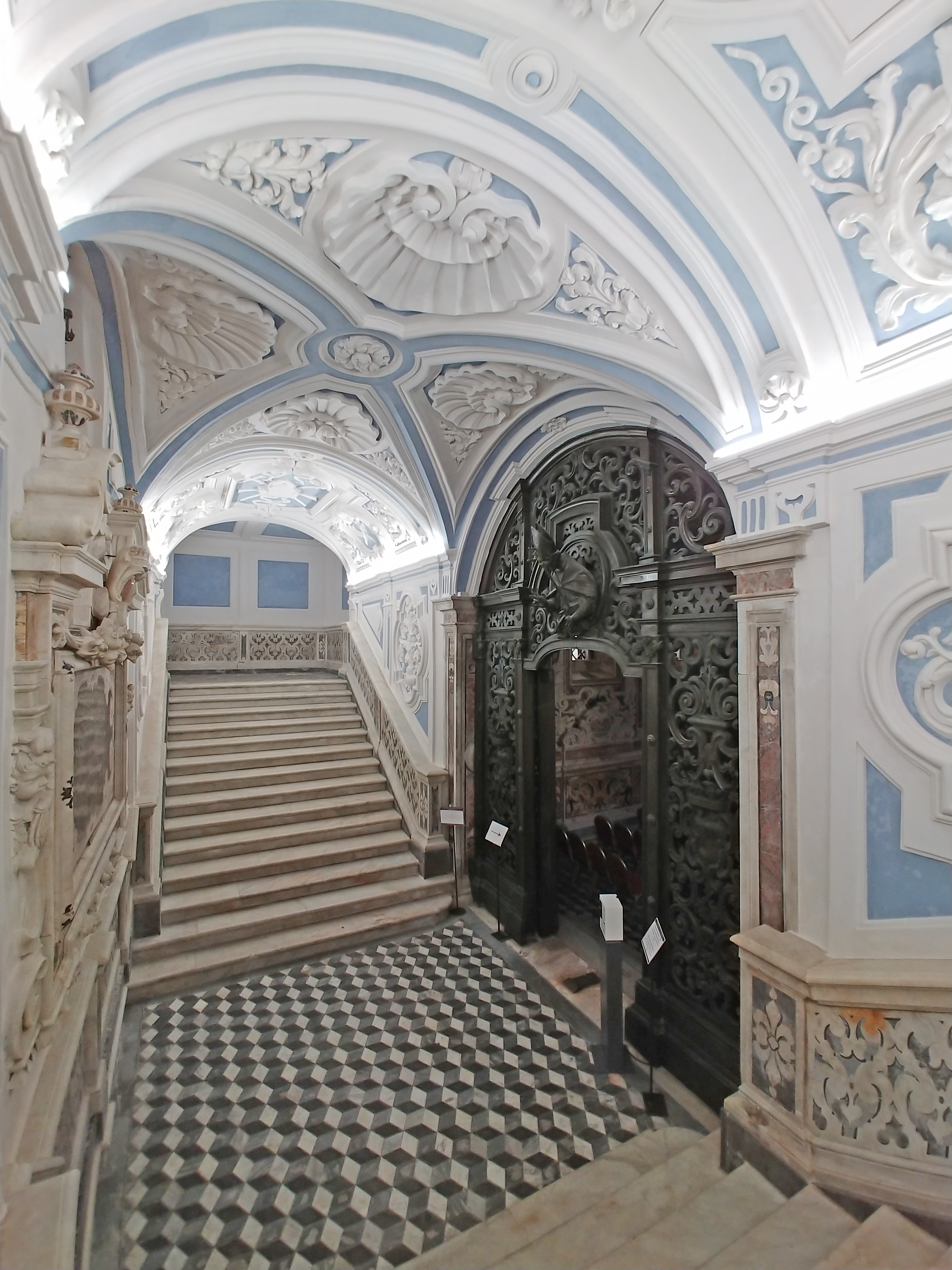
Staircase and vestibule of the crypt

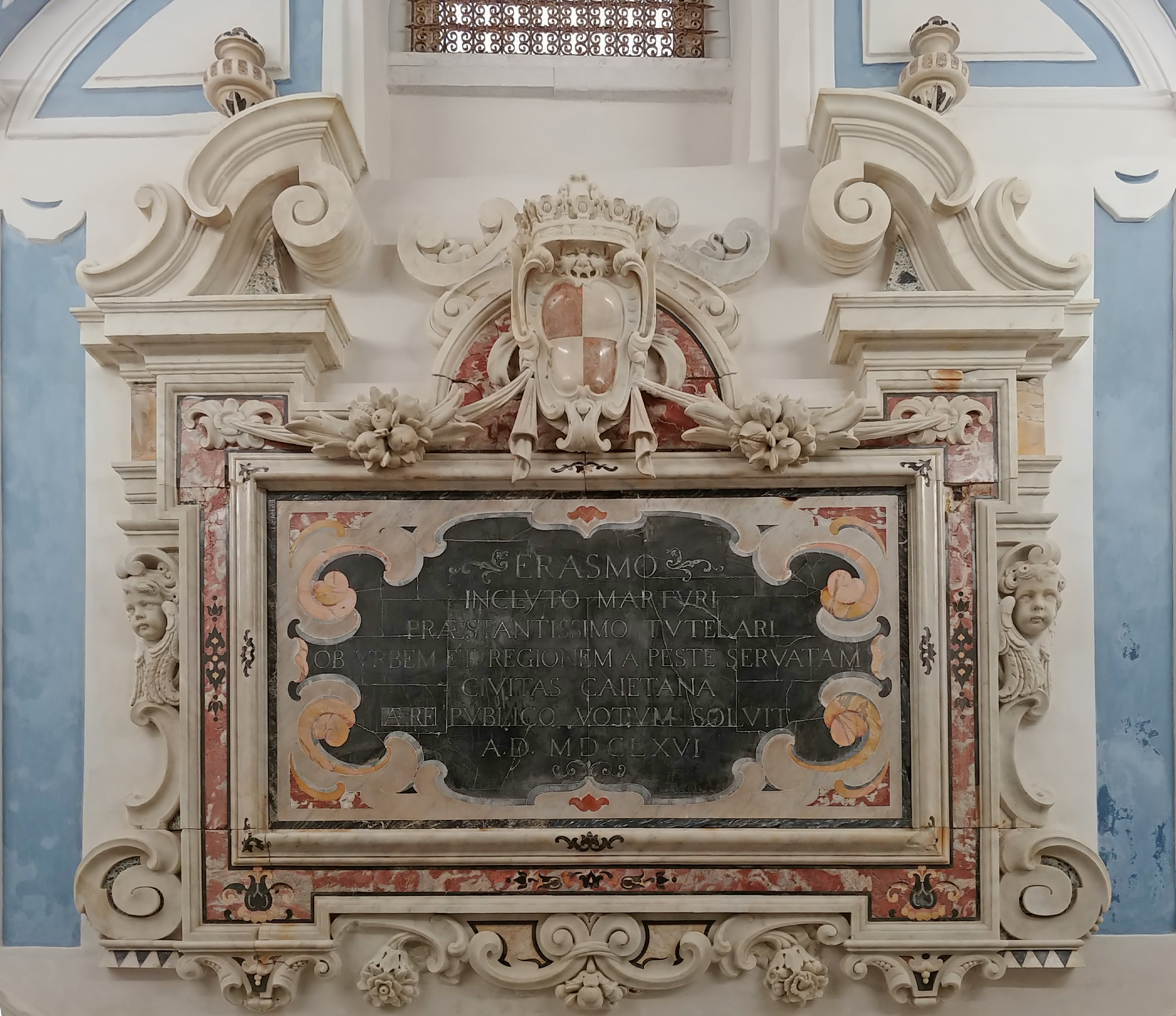
Gravestone of 1666

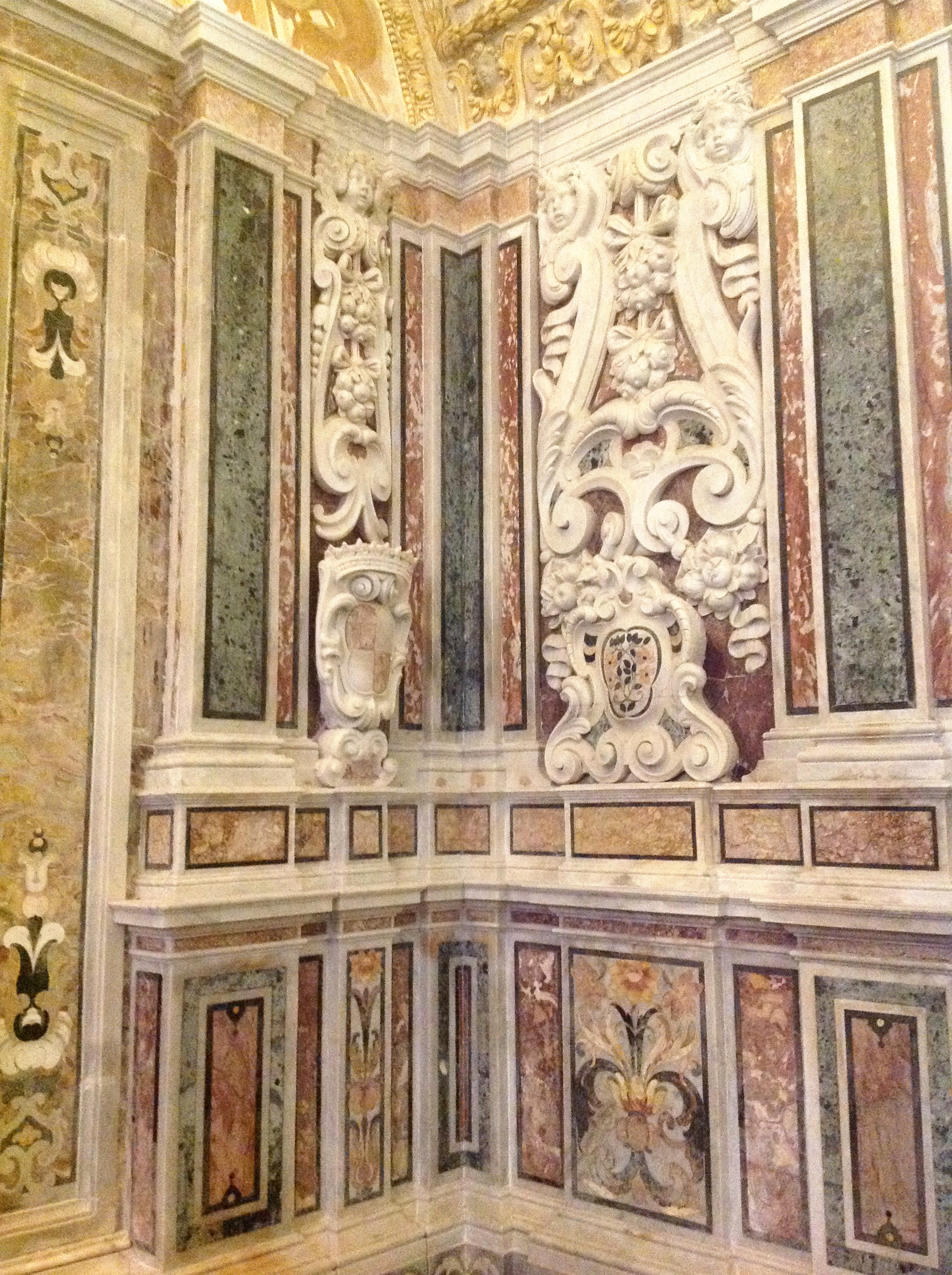
Detail of the marble decoration

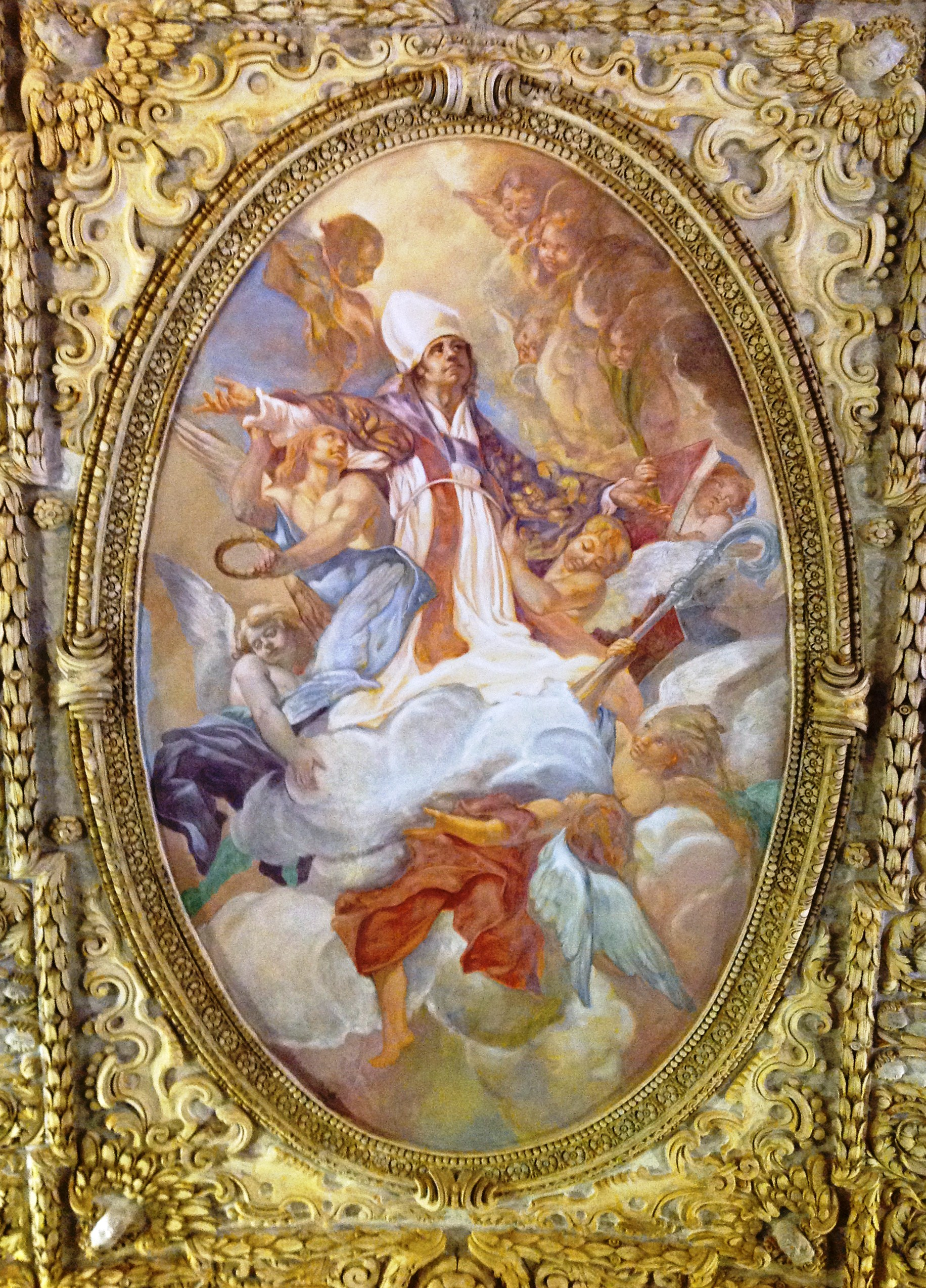
Glory of St. Erasmus

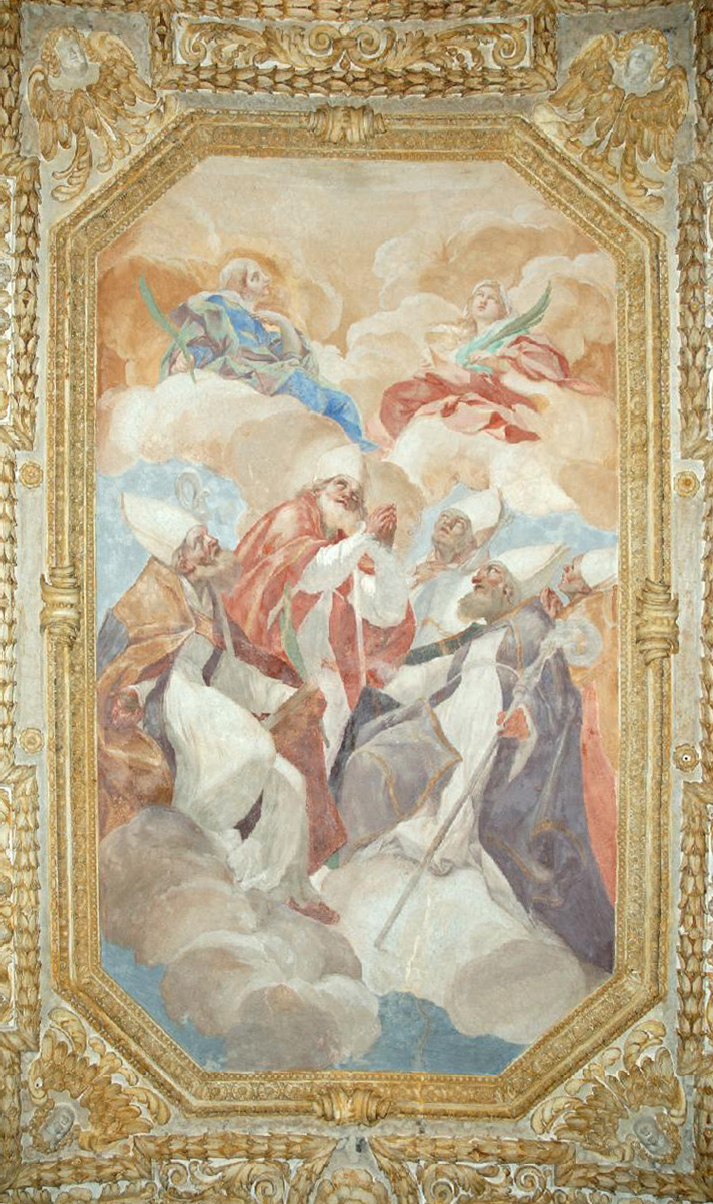
Glory of the saints

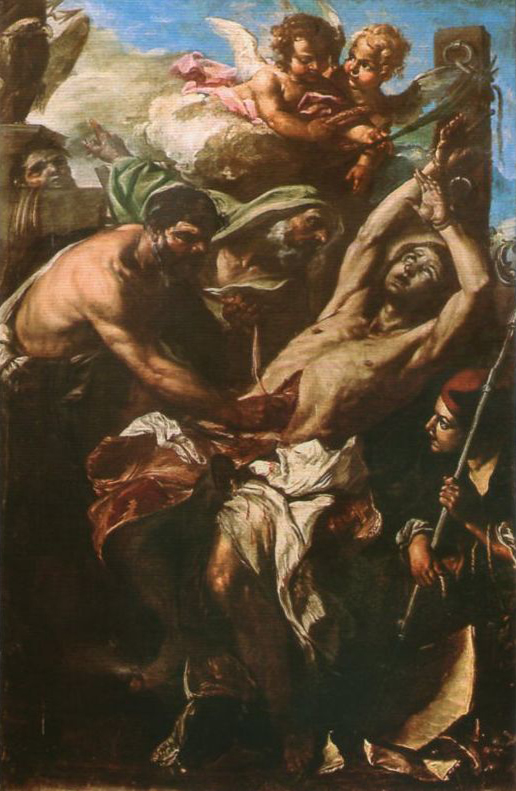
Martyrdom of St. Erasmus

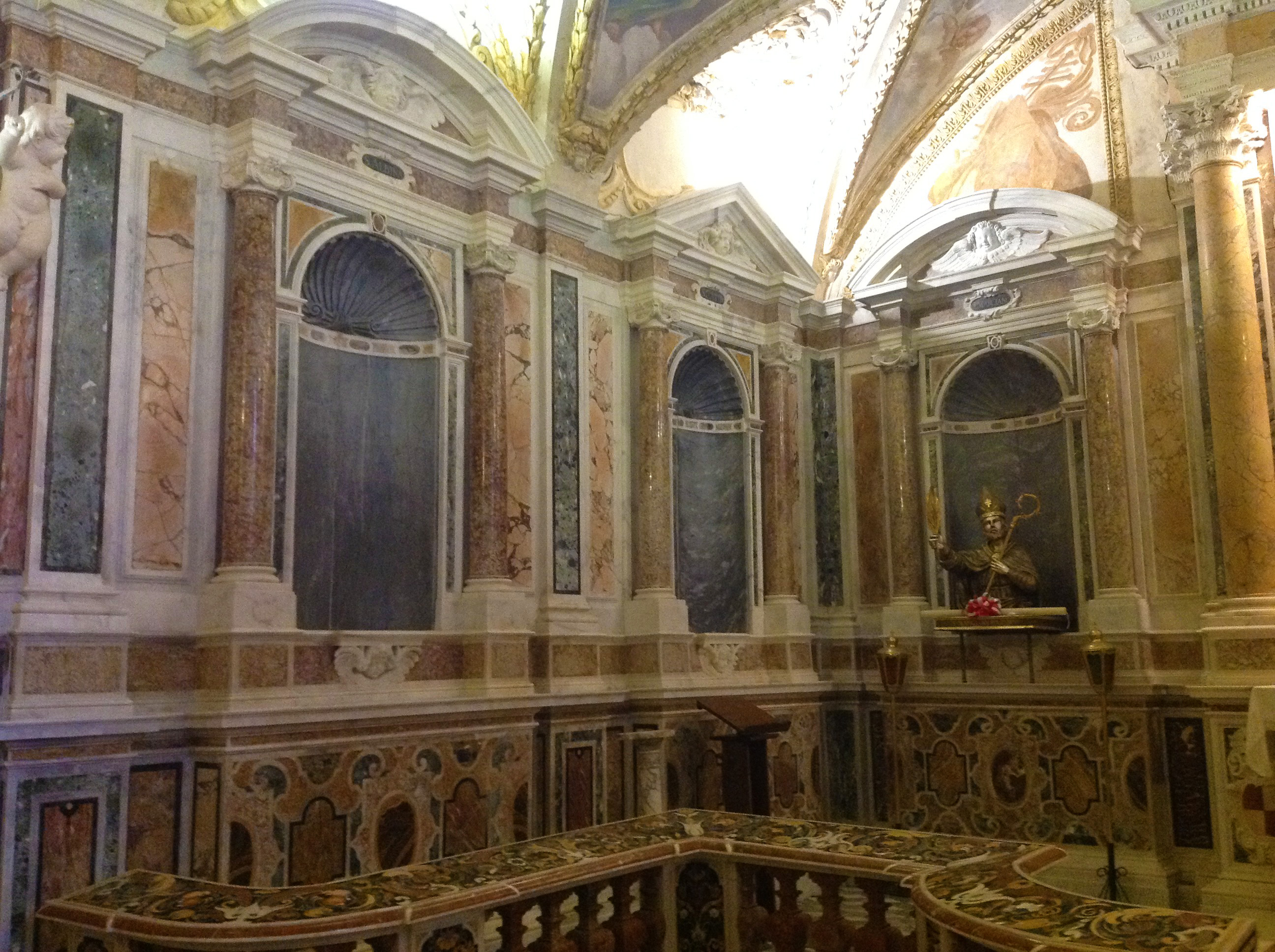
Chancel niches

=== Pipe organ ===
Pipe organ photos
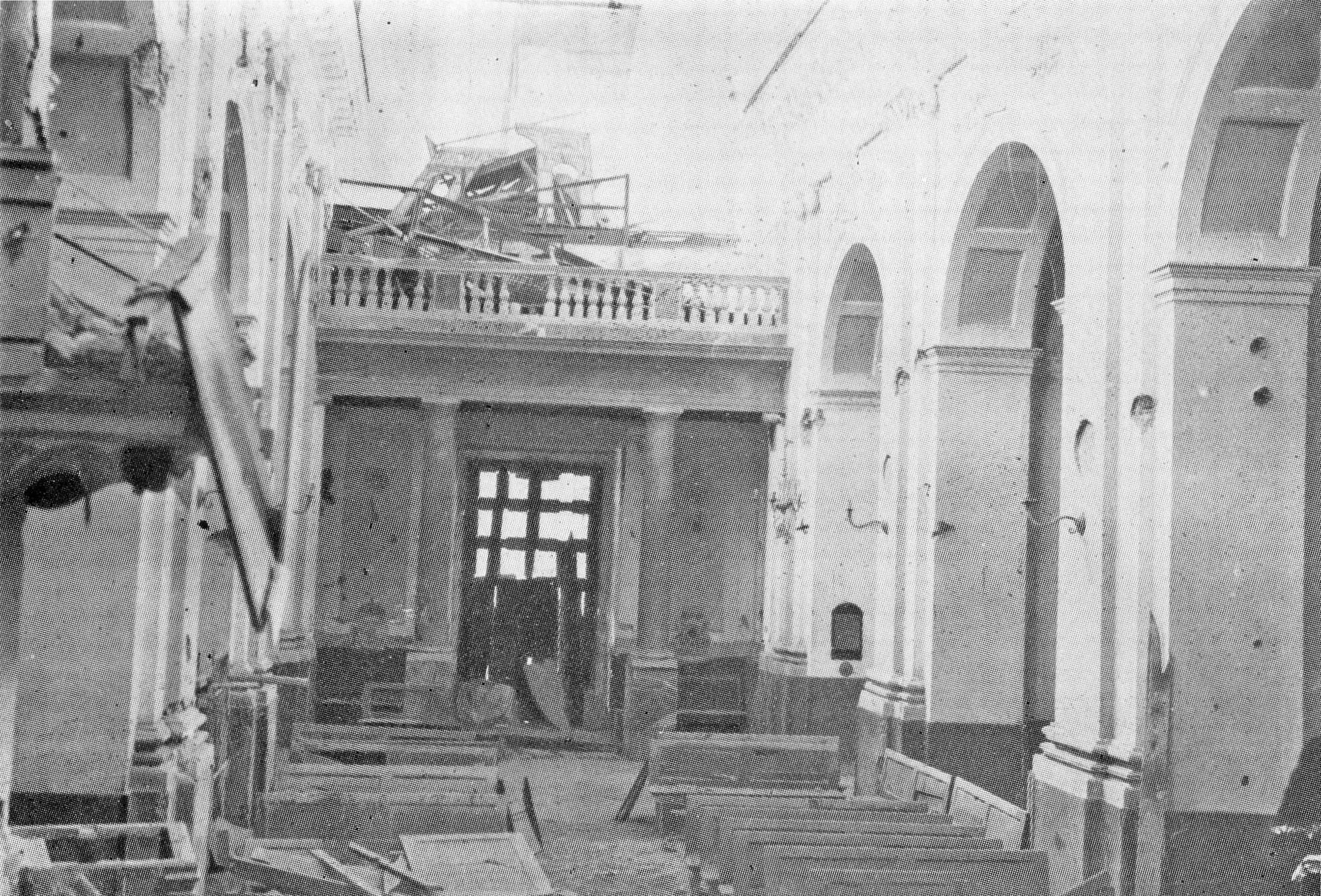
Interior of the cathedral after the 1943 bombing, with the remains of the Sarracini-Inzoli organ on the chancel.

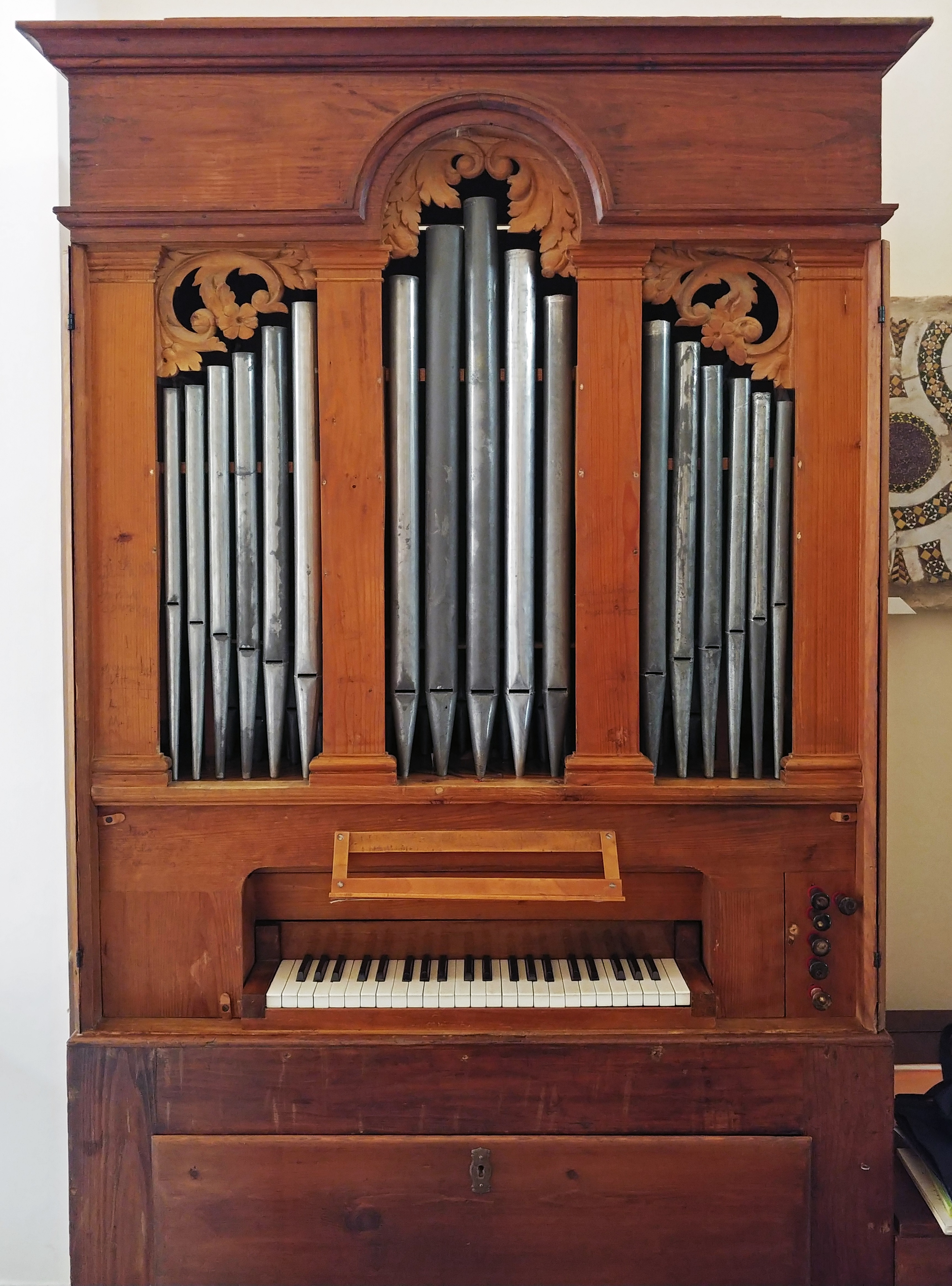
The current cathedral organ, built in 1892 by Carlo Alboreto for the archdiocesan seminary chapel, and moved there in 2021.

The cathedral's first pipe organ was probably built in the 16th century; identifiable as the front part of the latter's case is the frame of the triptych Coronation of the Virgin by Giovanni da Gaeta, formerly in the former church of Santa Lucia and now in the Diocesan Museum; it is characterized by the presence, on the top, of the gilded sculptures of Saints Erasmus, Michael the Archangel and Marcian.

Between 1685 and 1689, a pipe organ was built for the Church of the Santissima Annunziata by Giuseppe de Martino, enclosed within a Baroque case designed by Dionisio Lazzari; the original plan was to build a similar instrument to be placed on the opposite chancel, which, due to economic problems, was purchased by the cathedral and placed on the chancel behind the back wall of the new apse. The organ was enlarged in 1737 and removed as part of the neoclassical restorations of 1788–1792; it was placed either in the church of San Michele Arcangelo in Itri, or in the Gaetan church of the Nativity of Mary, and destroyed during World War II.

Pietro Paolo Ferrara designed a large choir loft above the entrance to the cathedral, supported by two Tuscan columns, on which an organ by Benedetto or Pietro Sarracini of Alvito found its place around the middle of the 19th century, remodeled in the early part of the next century by Inzoli. The instrument had a single keyboard and pedalboard and had 11 registers; it was enclosed within a wooden case with a serlian facade. The organ would be destroyed in the September 1943 bombing along with a small 19th-century positive organ located in the crypt.

In 1980 a new instrument was built by the Continiello firm (with pipes from the Scotti firm), consisting of a single unit located in the center of the chancel, with three spires and a base painted in 1985 with single-color decorations by Salvatore Sasso. The console, placed on the floor in the chancel, against the original plan that intended it to be on the chancel, had two keyboards and a pedalboard; the instrument had 11 registers. Due to rapid deterioration of the electrical transmission apparatus, it stopped working in 1995, and in 2000 the console was removed from the church. The instrument was transferred during the 2008-2014 restorations and relocated in 2020 to the church of San Francesco in Ozieri.

The organ currently present in the basilica was built by the Neapolitan Carlo Alboreto in 1892 for the chapel of Palazzo de Vio, which then housed the seminary, where it was placed on the choir loft; in 1994 it was transferred for the first time to the seminary's new location, and on that occasion restored by Carlo Soracco. In 2021 it was relocated to the cathedral, placed on a movable platform at the front of the chancel. The instrument, intact in its original phonic characteristics, has mechanical transmission and five registers. Its console, which is set in the center of the front wall of the case, has a single keyboard with a short first octave, no pedalboard, with the registers operated by wooden stop knobs. The phonic material is integrally enclosed within a wooden case soberly decorated with carvings and moldings, with a display consisting of tripartite diapason reeds within a serlian opening, closed by small doors; the console is windowed.

== See also ==
- Gaeta
- Rural Marian chapels of Gaeta

== Bibliography ==
- Tadisi, Jacopo Antonio (1760). Memorie della vita di monsignore Giovanni Caramuel di Lobkowitz vescovo di Vigevano. Venezia: Giovanni Tevernin.
- Federici, Giovanni Battista (1791). Degli Antichi duchi e consoli o ipati della città di Gaeta. Napoli: Vincenzo Flauto.
- Pergamo, Carlo (1779). Constitutiones diocesanae synodi. Napoli: Typographia Raymundiana.
- Schulz, Heinrich Wilhelm (1860). Denkmäler der Kunst des Mittelalters in Unteritalien (in German). Vol. II. Dresda: Wilhelm K. H. Schulz. doi:10.11588/DIGLIT.22894.
- Gaetani d'Aragona, Onorato (1885). Memorie storiche della città di Gaeta (2 ed.). Caserta: Stabilimento tipo-litografico della Minerva.
- Ferraro, Salvatore (1903). Memorie religiose e civili della città di Gaeta. Napoli: Tipografia Francesco Giannini & Figli.
- Capitolo Cattedrale, ed. (1909). La colonna istoriata di Gaeta: cenni storici e documenti. Gaeta: Salemme.
- Corpus Inscriptionum Latinarum. Vol. X. Berlino: Reimerum. 1933.
- Mortari, Luisa (October 1956). "Il restauro dello stendardo di Gaeta" (PDF). Bollettino d'Arte (XLI (4ª serie)). Roma: L'Erma di Bretschneider: 343–344. ISSN 0394-4573. Archived from the original (PDF) on 2023-01-05.
- Luigi Salerno, ed. (1956). Il Museo Diocesano di Gaeta e mostra di opere restaurate nella provincia di Latina. Gaeta: Ente Provinciale per il Turismo di Latina.
- Perrotti, Raffaele (1960). Restauro del campanile della Cattedrale di Gaeta. Gaeta: Tip. B. Fogar.
- Venditti, Arnaldo (1967). Architettura bizantina nell'Italia meridionale: Campania - Calabria - Lucania. Vol. II. Napoli: Edizioni scientifiche italiane.
- Allaria, Giuseppe (1970). Le chiese di Gaeta. Latina: Ente Provinciale per il Turismo, Camera di Commercio.
- Fiengo, Giuseppe (1971). Gaeta: monumenti e storia urbanistica. Napoli: Edizioni scientifiche italiane.
- Marcello di Marco; Franca Colozzo; Erasmo Vaudo (1972). Il campanile del duomo di Gaeta. Gaeta: Centro Storico Culturale.
- Giordano, Alberto (1972). La cattedra episcopale di Gaeta. Gaeta: Centro Storico Culturale.
- Maria Letizia Casanova, ed. (1976). Arte a Gaeta: dipinti dal XII al XVIII secolo. Firenze: Stiav.
- Tommaso Scalesse (1979). "La chiesa di S. Domenico a Gaeta". Quaderni dell'Istituto di Storia dell'Architettura. 25. Roma: Istituto di Storia dell'Architettura: 79–90.
- Di Maggio, Patrizia (1981). 134. Crocifissione. Gaeta: La Poligrafica. pp. 356–357.
- Micalizzi, Paolo (1984). Gaeta. Vol. 2. Milano: Tourng Club Italiano. pp. 350–357.
- Capobianco, Paolo (1986). Episcopato Gaetano. Gaeta: La Poligrafica.
- Erasmo Vaudo, ed. (1988). Oltre l'immagine. Iconografia mariana a Gaeta dal XIII al XIX secolo. Gaeta: Gaetagrafiche.
- Marini-Clarelli, Maria Vittoria (1991). Gaeta. Vol. II. Roma: Istituto della Enciclopedia Italiana. pp. 167–175. BNI 94-3095.
- D'Onofrio, Mario (1993). La Cattedrale di Caserta Vecchia (2 ed.). Roma: Editalia.
- Marco Ciampani (1995). L'ex cattedrale di S. Erasmo a Formia. Tentativo di riassunto degli scavi condotti da P. Vesely sotto la chiesa. Roma: Nuova Cultura.
- D'Onofrio, Mario (1996–1997). "La cattedrale di Gaeta nel medioevo". Rivista dell'Istituto Nazionale d'Archeologia e Storia dell'Arte (19-20 (3ª serie)). Roma: L'Erma di Bretschneider: 227–249. ISSN 0392-5285.
- Cattabiani, Alfredo; Marina Cepeda Fuentes (1998). Bestiario di Roma. Un insolito viaggio storico, artistico, archeologico alla riscoperta dei mitici e simbolici animali raffigurati in piazze, strade, monumenti e angoli nascosti della città. Roma: Newton Compton. ISBN 9788881833174.
- Elisabetta Campolongo (2001). Giovanni da Gaeta. Vol. 56. Roma: Istituto della Enciclopedia italiana. pp. 45–48. BNI 2002-12106.
- Fronzuto, Graziano (2001). Monumenti d'arte sacra a Gaeta: storia ed arte dei maggiori edifici religiosi di Gaeta. Gaeta: Edizioni del Comune di Gaeta.
- Claudio Rendina (2003). I papi. Storia e segreti (6 ed.). Roma: Newton & Compton Editori.
- Angiolillo, Marialuisa (2004). Giovanni da Gaeta "magister caietanus". Roma: Edicom.
- Campone, Maria Carolina (2004). "Trasformazioni nel Regno borbonico tra neoclassicismo ed eclettismo: Luigi De Vegni e Giacomo Guarinelli". Trasformazioni Nel Regno Borbonico Tra Neoclassicismo ed Eclettismo: Luigi de Vegni e Giacomo Guarinelli. Napoli.
- Granata, Piergiorgio (2004). Gaeta: viaggio nell'arte: pittura, scultura e arti minori dal medioevo ad oggi. Napoli: Guida. ISBN 978-88-7188-745-6.
- Sebenico, Sara (2005). I mostri dell'Occidente medievale: fonti e diffusione di razze umane mostruose, ibridi ed animali fantastici. Trieste: Università degli studi di Trieste.
- Gianandrea, Manuela (2006). "La scena del sacro. L'arredo liturgico del basso Lazio tra XI e XIV secolo". La Scena del Sacro. l'Arredo Liturgico del Basso Lazio Tra XI e XIV Secolo. Roma: Viella.
- Niglio, Olimpia (2006). Guido Biscontin; Guido Driussi (eds.). "Pavimentazioni storiche : uso e conservazione. Atti del convegno di studi, Bressanone 11-14 luglio 2006". Opus Tessellatum a Pisa e Nella Chiesa di San Pietro in Vinculis. Marghera: Arcadia Ricerche: 571–578.
- Tallini, Gennaro (2006). Gaeta: una città nella storia. Gaeta: Edizioni del Comune di Gaeta.
- Capobianco, Paolo (2006). La cattedrale di Gaeta. Cenni del 900º anniversario della consacrazione. Fondi: Arti Grafiche Kolbe.
- Macaro, Carlo (2008). La Diocesi di Gaeta nel '700. Fondi: Tipolitografia C.O.R.E.
- De Mieri, Stefano (2009). Girolamo Imperato nella pittura napoletana tra '500 e '600. Napoli: Arte tipografica.
- Maria Teresa Longo; Edoardo Currà; Fabrizio Toppetti, eds. (2009). Oltre la tutela. 70 interventi al cuore dei Comuni. Roma: Palombi.
- Serafinelli, Guendalina (2011). "La decorazione pittorica di Giacinto Brandi nella cripta del duomo di Sant'Erasmo in Gaeta: nuovi documenti e letture iconografiche". Arte Documento (27). Venezia: Marcianum Press: 132–141. ISSN 1121-0524.
- D'Auria, Alessandranna (2013). Il medioevo a Geata: le cinte murarie e l'Ecclesia Salvatoris (secc. VI-X). Città di Castello: Nuova Prhomos.
- Tallini, Gennaro (2013). Vita quotidiana a Gaeta nell'età del viceregno spagnolo. Gaeta: Centro Storico Culturale "Gaeta".
- Vaudo, Erasmo (2013). Gaeta, una roccaforte tra post-raffaellismo e pittura devota. Roma: Fratelli Palombi.
- Arcidiocesi di Gaeta, ed. (2014). Annuario Diocesano 2014 (PDF). Fondi: Arti grafiche Kolbe. Archived from the original (PDF) on 13 March 2016.
- Sorabella, Lino (2014). Ecclesia Mater. La Cattedrale di Gaeta. Marina di Minturno: Caramanica Editore.
- Vaudo, Erasmo (2014). Sebastiano Conca: la committenza in patria. Gaeta: Confraternita del SS. Rosario.
- Fabrizio Capanni; Giampiero Lilli, eds. (2015). Le cattedrali del Lazio. L'adeguamento liturgico delle chiese madri nella regione ecclesiastica del Lazio. Cinisello Balsamo: Silvana.
- Serafinelli, Guendalina (2015). Giacinto Brandi (1621-1691). Catalogo ragionato delle opere. Torino: Umberto Allemandi.
- Vella, Alessandro (2016). "Formia. S. Erasmo. Ecclesia". Fana, Templa, Delubra. Corpus dei Luoghi di Culto dell'Italia Antica. Institut des civilisations. Parigi: Collège de France: 60–66. doi:10.4000/books.cdf.4255. ISBN 978-2-7226-0443-8.
- Mario d'Onofrio; Manuela Gianandrea, eds. (2018). Gaeta medievale e la sua cattedrale. Roma: Campisano.
