= Church of St. Catherine of Alexandria (Gaeta) =

Church in Gaeta, Italy

- Chiesa di Santa Caterina d'Alessandria
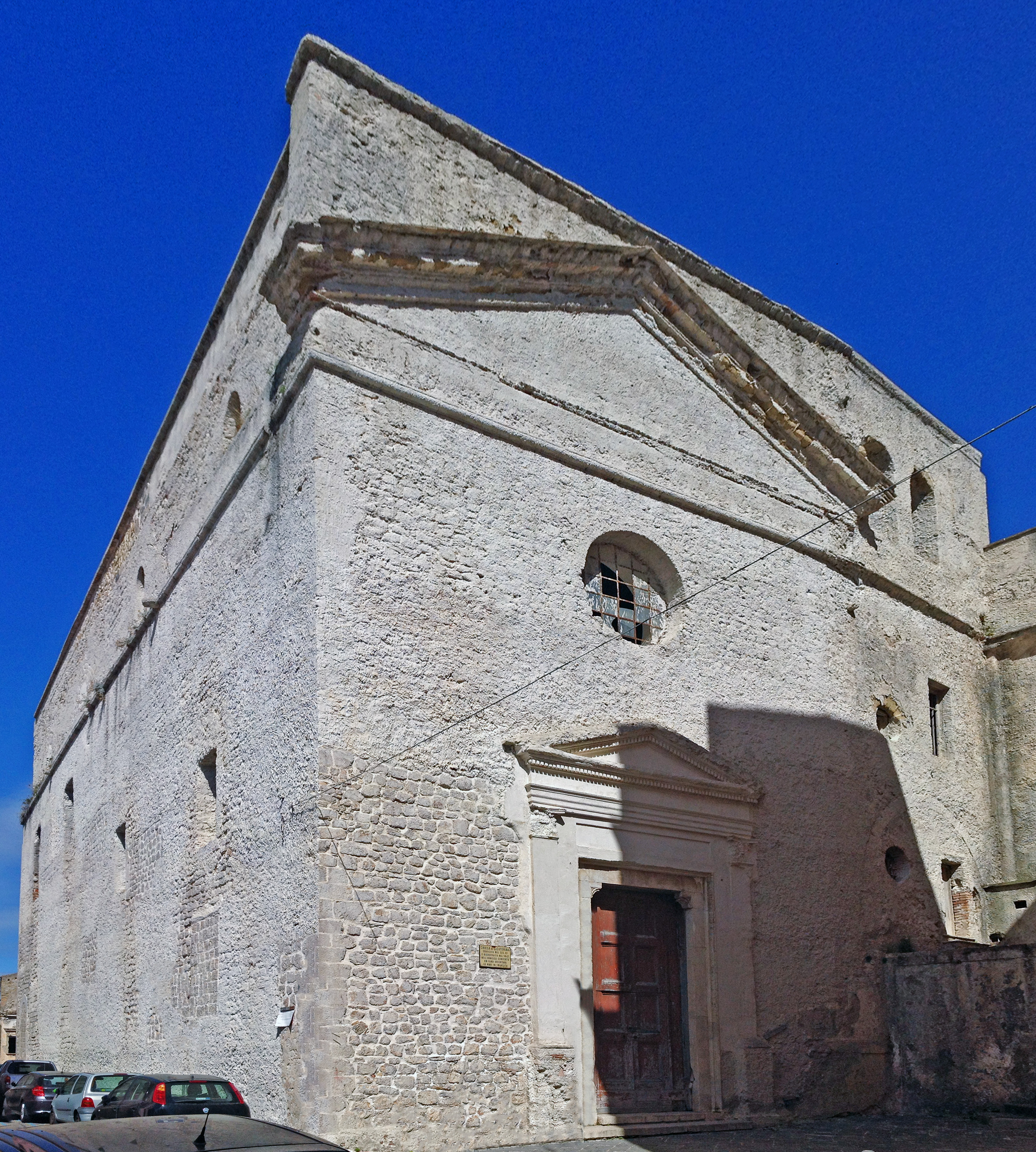
- Exterior
- Church of St. Catherine of Alexandria
- 41°12′30″N 13°35′22″E
- Location: Gaeta, Lazio, Italy
- Address: Via Pio IX, 41
- Denomination: Catholic

History
- Dedication: Catherine of Alexandria

Architecture
- Style: Gothic architecture (structure); Baroque architecture and Neoclassical architecture (decorations)
- Groundbreaking: 14th century
- Completed: 1855

Administration
- Archdiocese: Roman Catholic Archdiocese of Gaeta

The church of St. Catherine of Alexandria is a building in the historic center of Gaeta, Italy, located on Pius IX Street.

The church, closed for worship since 1987 and in a state of abandonment, though not deconsecrated, is located within the territory of the parish that overlooks the cathedral of Saints Erasmus and Marcianus and St. Mary of the Assumption.

== History ==
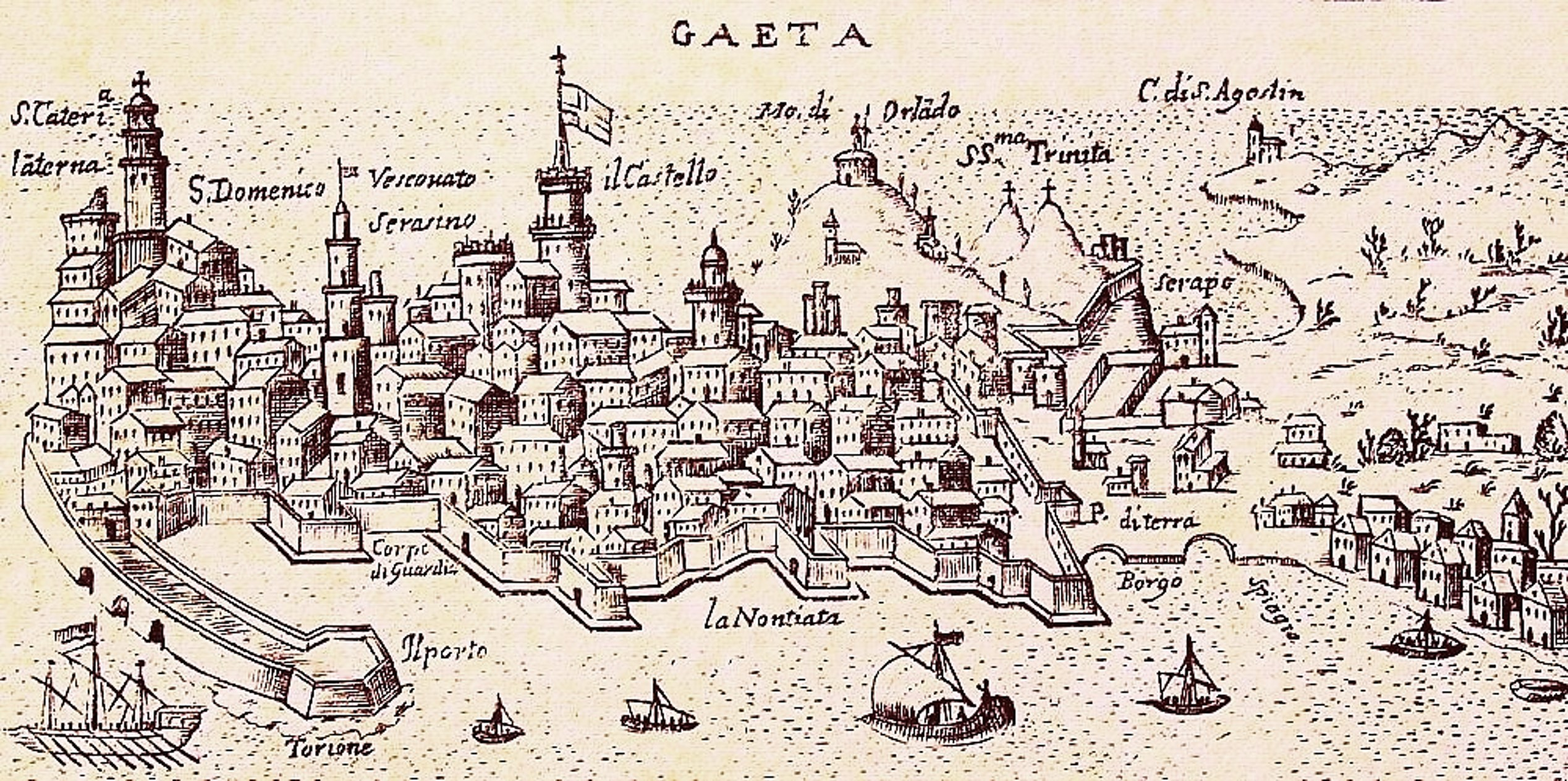
Seventeenth-century engraving depicting a view of the city of Gaeta; the lighthouse ("Lanterna") of St. Catherine is shown on the upper left side.

The earliest established record concerning a women's monastery dedicated to St. Catherine of Alexandria dates back to 1384; according to the "Platea del Venerabile Monastero S. Caterina della Città di Gaeta" of c. 1748, however, it would have existed as early as the 11th century (as confirmed by a grant in emphyteusis signed by the abbess of St. Catherine's in 1202), although it cites a document that would date its foundation to 1298. Almost certainly of Benedictine rule from its origins, it was adjacent to another Benedictine women's monastery called St. Chirico or Quirico, first mentioned in a 1024 document in the Codex diplomaticus cajetanus. It is unclear whether the monasteries were originally united or whether they were always distinct, though somewhat interdependent. In 1255, at the behest of the mayor of Gaeta Gilberto dei Ramisidis in the area of the monastery a lighthouse was built, the lighting of whose oil lantern was entrusted to the nuns, who in turn over the centuries subcontracted it to private citizens. At the end of the same century, at the same time as the foundation of the Cistercian monastery of Santo Spirito di Zennone (1295) in the Gaetan hinterland, St. Catherine's was handed over to the female branch of that order. In the 14th century, the present church of St. Catherine was built in the Gothic style.

With a papal bull of Nicholas V dated April 25, 1451, the Benedictine nuns from the nearby monastery of Santa Maria della Maina converged on San Chirico, becoming Cistercians. According to Giuseppe Fiengo, the complex of Santa Caterina/San Chirico and that of Santa Maria della Maina/San Domenico constituted “in the highest part of the town, a true monastic citadel.” In the 1459 census San Chirico was listed as the seat of the parish of the same name, which numbered 53 families; there is no information about the date of its suppression. Since the 15th century, the presence of nuns also from the families of the Gaetan nobility is attested in the monastery. In the summer of 1547 Ignatius of Loyola, founder and superior general of the Society of Jesus, worked to ensure that the cloister was restored and fully respected by the community. In 1625 the monastery housed 41 nuns, making it the largest women's monastery in the diocese of Gaeta; over the centuries it enjoyed considerable prestige, linked to the lighthouse (by virtue of which it collected a tax from ships entering or leaving the port), the many rents and landed properties (despite which it was also the subject of public subsidies), and the fact that it housed the town archives; in 1584 the civic magistrate of Gaeta endowed the monastery with a public clock; in 1639 the monastery founded a chapel dedicated to the Madonna Bambina in the Gaetan countryside, in the Conca locality, on land it owned, entrusting its care to a hermit who lived there. In 1673, the bishop of Gaeta Martín Ibáñez y Villanueva proceeded with a recognition of the mortal remains of St. Montanus, a Roman soldier martyred in the 2nd century, hitherto venerated inside the ancient church of St. Chirico; on that occasion, the entire complex was divided into two independent monasteries by the erection of a wall: the area of St. Catherine's remained with the Cistercians, while that formerly of St. Chirico's became the seat of a community of Franciscan tertiaries; the two monasteries were connected with each other exclusively by a small window inside the lighthouse. The cult of Saints Cyricus and Julitta was transferred to the new church of San Montano, in which a side altar was named after them.

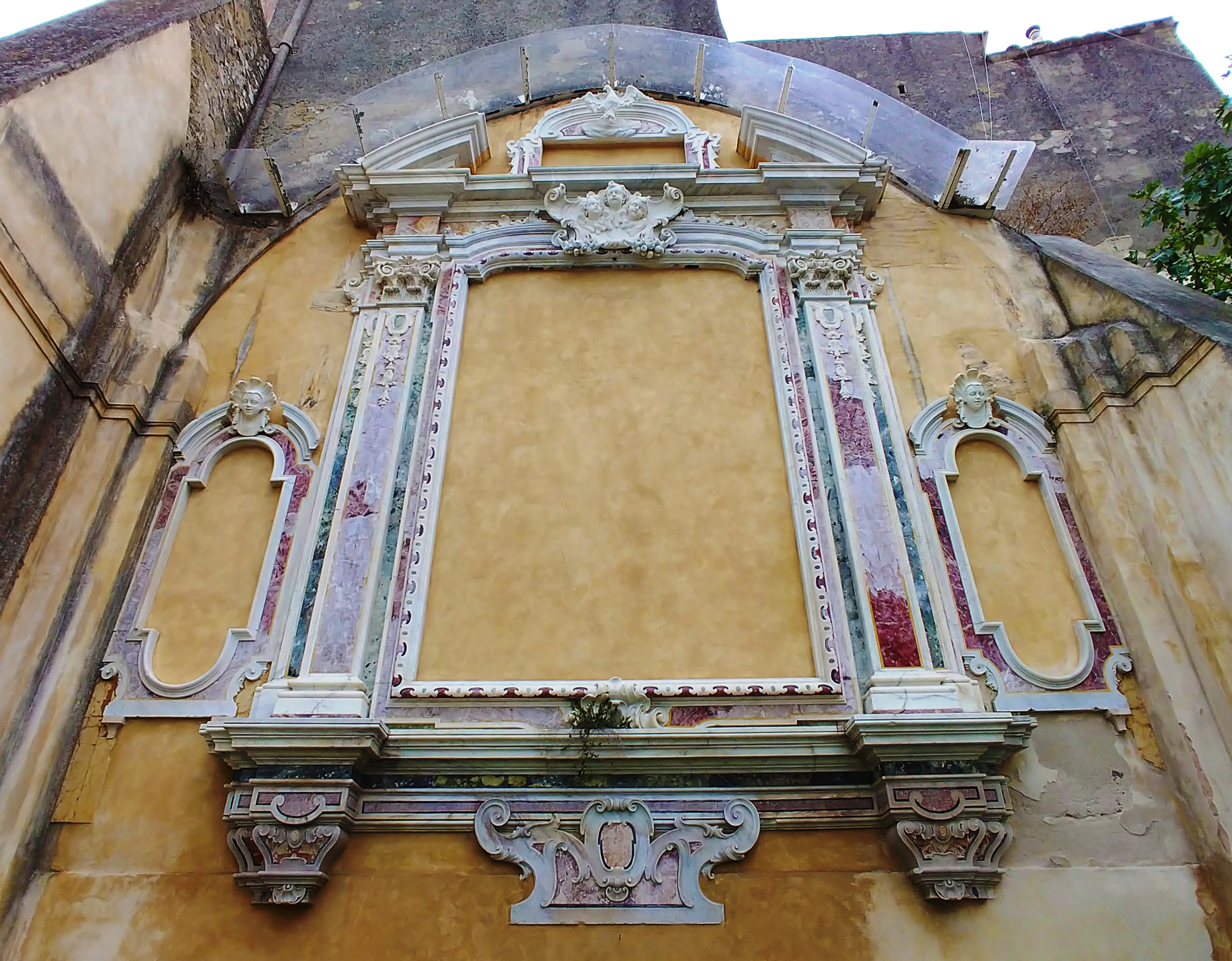
The altarpiece of the 18th-century high altar, transferred to the church of St. Anthony Abbot (later demolished).

In 1705 the church of St. Catherine was decorated with a Baroque style; as part of this intervention, three polychrome marble altars attributable to the Neapolitan Domenico Antonio Vaccaro were erected, of which one side altar went to frame a pre-existing altarpiece, made by Andrea Vaccaro around 1660 and depicting the titular saint; the painting Madonna and Child Appearing to St. Bernard, placed on the altar opposite, is also attributed to the former artist. The high altar was surmounted by a painting depicting the Mystic Marriage of St. Catherine of Alexandria between Saints Augustine and Benedict, by Pietro Novelli. In 1720 Bishop José Guerrero de Torres of Gaeta, who had promoted the Baroque restoration, was buried in the church. In 1722 the monastery housed 37 professed sisters, 11 laywomen and 2 boarders; in the account drawn up by Bishop Carlo Pignatelli, C.R. for the ad limina visit of 1725, the presence of 43 professed sisters and 10 laywomen was recorded in the monastery; in a similar context, in 1742 Gennaro Carmignano reported the decrease in the number of religious women, a total of about 40 of whom 27 were professed, denouncing the great liberties granted to them by the lay administrators, especially their possession of the keys to the monastery.

With the suppression of religious orders in 1809, both monasteries were closed and the entire complex requisitioned for military purposes, converted first into barracks under the name “Caserma Cavour,” then into a military hospital (transferred in 1860 from the former St. Francis Convent) and later into an infirmary; the church of St. Catherine fell into neglect and was used as a straw warehouse until 1850. The following year at the interest of Vicar General Giuseppe Iannitti, the three Baroque altars were moved respectively to the church of St. Anthony Abbot (the main one) and to the first two right-hand chapels of the cathedral (the two side ones); in St. James, however, along with the high altar of the nearby church of St. Montano, the two stoups of St. Catherine's were moved.

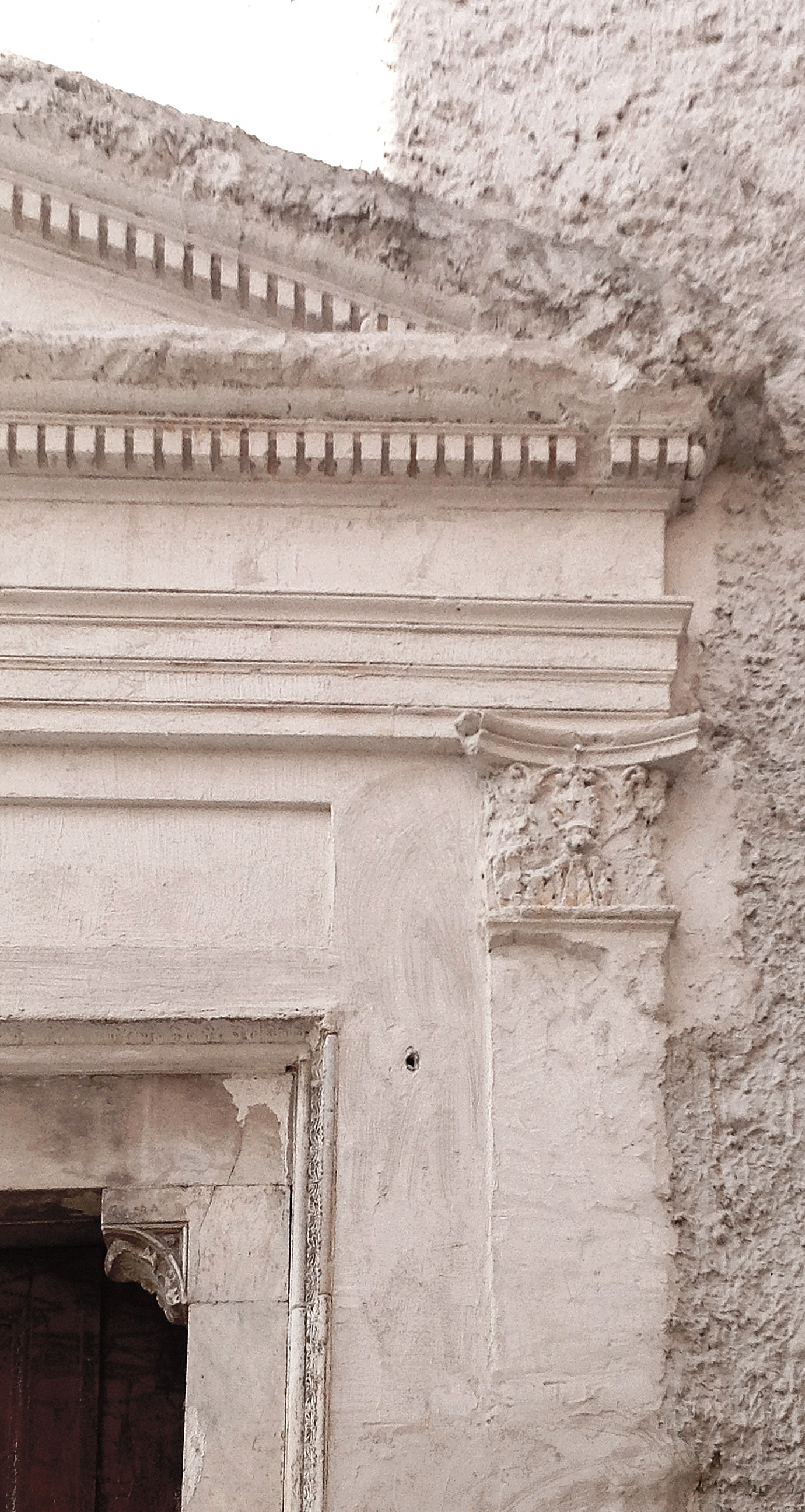
Detail of the church portal; note the superimposition of neoclassical decoration on the original Gothic elements, which are still visible.

Ferdinand II of the Two Sicilies, following Pope Pius IX's stay in Gaeta (1848-1849), wanted several churches in the city that had fallen into neglect due to the suppression of religious orders to be restored and reopened for worship. The work in St. Catherine's began in 1852 and lasted until 1856, and was carried out under the direction of Giacomo Guarinelli, who in those same years was also working on the rebuilding of the temple of St. Francis; it consisted of a consolidation of the Gothic structure and the creation of a sober external and internal decorative apparatus in neoclassical style. In 1854, work was also done on the lighthouse, modernizing it, while in 1857-1858 necessary redevelopment and refitting of the former monastery, which had remained a military property, was carried out. The church of St. Catherine became a royal patronage with its own annuities; it remained so until November 9, 1889, together with St. Francis it was annexed to the cathedral chapter. Onorato Gaetani dell'Aquila d'Aragona, mayor of Gaeta in 1870-1876, would have wished to move the parish of Santa Lucia there during his tenure, in order to turn the nearby church of the same name, once deconsecrated, into a museum of art and local history.

During World War II, on November 3, 1943, German troops blew up the old lighthouse attached to the convent with mines; the church was officiated regularly until 1945. In 1958-1960, the premises of the Cavour barracks housed the Naples Judicial Prison, later becoming temporary housing for refugees, before falling into neglect again; only the area formerly pertaining to the monastery of San Montano was restored to become the headquarters of the Nautical School of the Guardia di Finanza. When the church of Santa Lucia was closed for worship in 1966 (only to be deconsecrated in 1972), the cult of the Syracusan martyr and the related parish were transferred first to San Domenico, then to Santa Caterina until the latter's closure in 1987 as well. Since then it has been lying in a state of neglect; in the early 2010s its exterior facades were the subject of a conservative restoration.

== Description ==
=== Architecture ===
The church of St. Catherine stands on the highest site of the promontory of Punta Stendardo, in a dominant position over the surrounding built-up area. The building runs parallel to Pius IX Street and its front elevation leads onto a narrow little square, created in 1840 through the enlargement of the pre-existing alley, which on the opposite side of the aforementioned street descends by a wide flight of steps to Salita Chiaromonte. Its structure is still the 14th-century Gothic one, covered with sober neoclassical decorations as part of the restorations conducted by Giacomo Guarinelli in 1852-1856.

=== Exterior ===
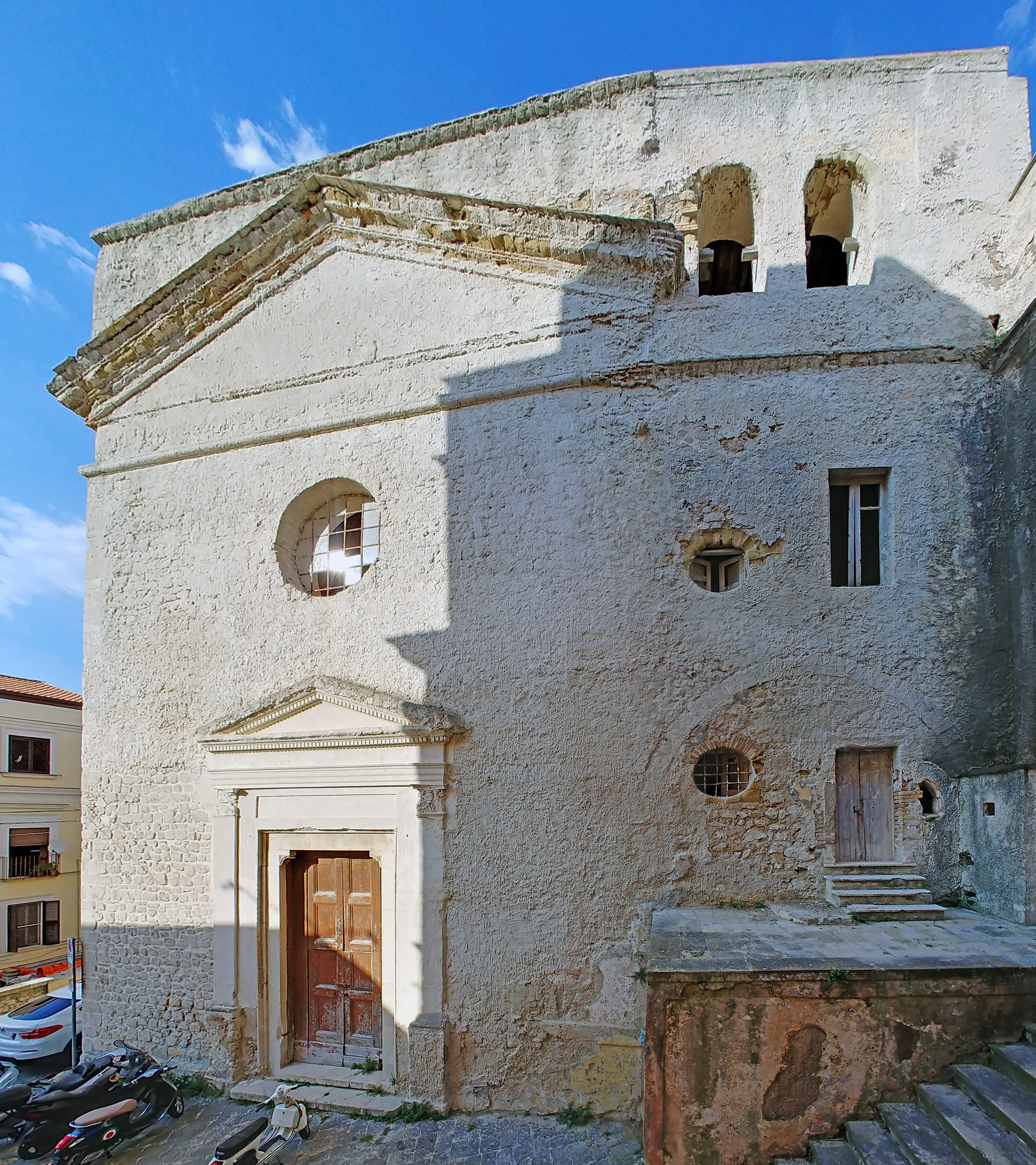
Facade and bell tower.

The nineteenth-century additions to the exterior (mainly cornices) were largely removed as part of the 2010 restorations, along with large portions of the plaster cladding; the medieval wall face, consisting of squared blocks of local limestone, is visible. Along the left flank, in the masonry, is inserted a marble fragment, in bas-relief, a wickerwork decoration with leaves alternating with clusters, presumably originally pertaining to a pillar. The cross vaults of the nave, extradossed according to typical Gaetan usage, on the front and left sides are incorporated within a rear superelevation, similarly to what happened in the church of Sant'Angelo in Planciano, without, however, the superimposition of an additional covering that is present in Santissima Annunziata. This overlapping, following the removal of the plaster, nevertheless allows the ogival profile of the crosses to be seen, and the windows that opened in the center of each lunette, respectively a splayed pointed-arched monofora (first and second bays, still open) and an oculus (third and fourth bays and apse, walled up), are visible; they are set on the Gothic summit cornice, which surrounds the hall on all sides and still bears, on Pius IX Street, some of the simple stone gargoyles. On the same flank, in the lower part of the wall, the four large rectangular windows that give light to the nave, as well as the marble outline of a round-arched plugged portal, located at the fourth bay, on the axis of an alley that no longer exists, are visible at two different heights due to the presence of the chancel inside. The vault of the apse is also on two sides protected by a superelevation similar to that of the nave.

The facade of the church is gabled. At the bottom, in the center, is the portal, dating from the 14th century and later remodeled; to its early design belong the piers (of which the one on the left bears numerous engravings from the medieval period, including the coat of arms of the Ristalda family), the architrave supported by two corbels carved with plant motifs, and the cornice richly decorated in relief; the stucco apparatus surrounding it, consisting of two Corinthian pilasters, a high cornice and a triangular tympanum, covers the ancient lunette; above it, the circular rose window. The crowning of the elevation, set into the superelevation surrounding the vault, also consists of a triangular, projecting gable. To the right of the facade, parallel to it, stands the nineteenth-century bell tower with two monoforas side by side; these housed as many bells cast in Naples in 1856, currently in storage at the "Antonio Sapone" municipal art gallery in Gaeta. The remains of the original bell gable are visible on the left side, above the left half of the lunette of the vault of the second bay, where the masonry shows traces of polychromy.

=== Interior ===
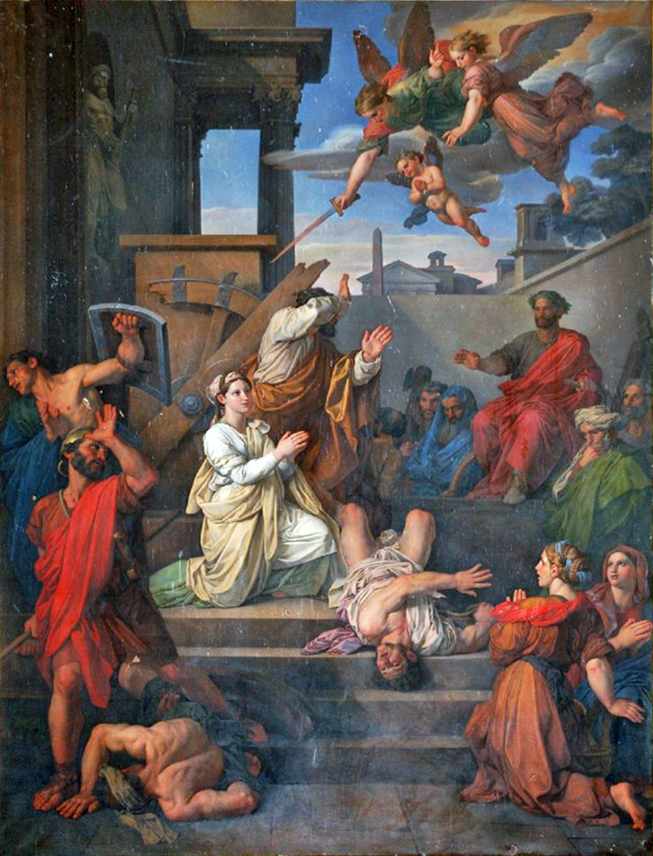
Gaetano Forte, Martyrdom of St. Catherine, 1856, oil on canvas; the painting was made for the high altar of the church of St. Catherine, and in 1988 it was relocated to the interior of the cathedral of Saints Erasmus and Marcianus and St. Mary of the Assumption.

Inside, the church is divided into a single nave of four bays, covered with cross vaulting and marked by pilasters slightly protruding from the side walls. The exceptional extension of the chancel, over two bays instead of one, a unique case in the entire city of Gaeta, is peculiar, linked to the large number of nuns who had their choir on it; a wide archway almost as wide as the nave, constitutes the overlooking of the latter, bordered by low nineteenth-century wrought-iron railings; the lower choir presents the same scanning as the room above, also with cross vaults. The covering of the entire wall surface dates as a whole from the restorations of 1852-1856, and incorporates in the vaults of the third and fourth bays and the apse the Baroque one of 1705, which shows strong similarities with the seventeenth-century one of the sanctuary of the Santissima Annunziata, by Dionisio Lazzari. The pinkish plaster of the walls and vaults is traversed by white-colored stucco frames, which follow the underlying Gothic architecture; the three aforementioned vaults are adorned with rosette keystones, which have partly collapsed; the choir area, however, has no relief decoration. In the last two bays of the nave, on the right wall there are trompe l'oeil imitations of the large windows that open symmetrically on the opposite side. On the back wall of the room, an ogival arch leads to a quadrangular apse, narrower than the nave, also with a cross-vaulted ceiling, above which the frame of the lost painting of the Purità by Tommaso De Vivo (1853) can be seen. The terracotta floor, made up of polychrome tiles arranged in a grid, seems to have been severely damaged.

There are three altars in the church, the result of the 19th-century restoration; they are made of polychrome marble and bear geometric inlaid ornamentation. The high altar, raised three steps, is slightly offset from the back wall of the apse, and is connected to the side ones by two doors, each of which is surmounted by a low arched tympanum with, in the center, an angel's head in high relief. The mensa is supported by two massive half-pillars with faux fluting, which frame the slightly recessed antependium, in the center of which is, framed by a rectangular red porphyry field, a tondo with a Maltese cross in white marble. The tabernacle follows the same chromaticism, and consists of a rectangular case with an arched doorway and projecting top cornice, and an attic in green marble that echoes the outline of the lower step of the elevation. Above the high altar is the large cornice that housed Gaetano Forte's Martyrdom of St. Catherine of Alexandria (1856). The two side altars are in a poor state of preservation; on a dark marble background, irregular octagons with white marble relief frames follow one another; originally the altars were supported at the corners by two small columns, no longer in place, while the tabernacles bear traces of a triangular tympanum.

=== Former monastery ===
The former monastery, in a state of abandonment and decay, is located in the area between the church of St. Catherine, the Cavour barracks (the headquarters of the Nautical School of the Guardia di Finanza, housed in the former monastery of San Montano) and the cliff overlooking the Gulf of Gaeta. After the suppression of 1809, the building underwent major alterations to be adapted to the needs of its new military destination. The present entrance dates from the 19th-century renovations, is located at the end of the small square in front of the church façade, perpendicular to the latter, and consists of a low arched doorway set in a smooth ashlar wall face; on the top of the elevation is a bartizan made of masonry.

The structure is built around the cloister. It is not adjacent to the church and has four cross-vaulted galleries that are articulated around an irregular trapezoidal central space, onto which they open by means of semicircular arches resting on quadrilateral pillars to which are buttresses supporting the overlying loggias, currently plugged, which were built at a later date. The floor level of the open-air area is significantly higher than that of the galleries, due to the presence of three cisterns for the collection of rainwater.

Although modified, some of the monastic rooms are still recognizable: on the first floor, the nuns' hall (perpendicular to the church), the refectory (between the cloister and the sea, with an eighteenth-century lunetted vault, divided by partition walls into three smaller rooms), the sacristy (to the right of the church apse, with a stoup bearing the Laudato family crest), and the adjacent chapter house (supported in the center by a Corinthian column incorporated within later masonry); on the second floor, the dormitory of the professed (church side), that of the lay sisters (barracks side) and the library (above the chapter house). The second floor was elevated by the military in the 19th century. In the cavity between the right side of the church and the cistern parallel to it, there is a large piece of wall painting datable to the late 11th century and next century, depicting a deer being chased by a lion in a forest setting.

At the southern corner of the monastery, on the second floor level, the remains of the lighthouse, built in 1255, later restored several times and blown up by German troops in 1943, are visible. It consisted of a tower with a circular plan, and in 1854 the lighthouse was located 72.43 m above sea level, and was visible at a distance of 18 NM. At its entrance was a plaque, which has been lost, with the following memorial inscription in Gothic characters, surmounted by an engraving of the Agnus Dei:

In die Domini Salvatoris nostri Iesu Christi anno nativitatis eius MCCLV pro (?) decembre pontificatus vera patri domini nostri Alesadri IIII P.P. nobilis et egregius vir dominus Gibertus De Ramisidi ivi parnesi potestas Gaietanus dominus Vuolvinius ap consul (?) ivi (?) totius populi Gaietani fecit [---] pro salute fieri (iussit).
This deed was done on a Sunday in December 1250, during the pontificate of Alexander IV, by the noble and distinguished Giberto Dei Ramisidi, Podestà of Gaeta, and Lord Vuolvinio, Consul, who had the [lighthouse] erected there for the health of all the people of Gaeta.

—Inscription above the lighthouse door, which has been lost.

== Works already present in the church ==
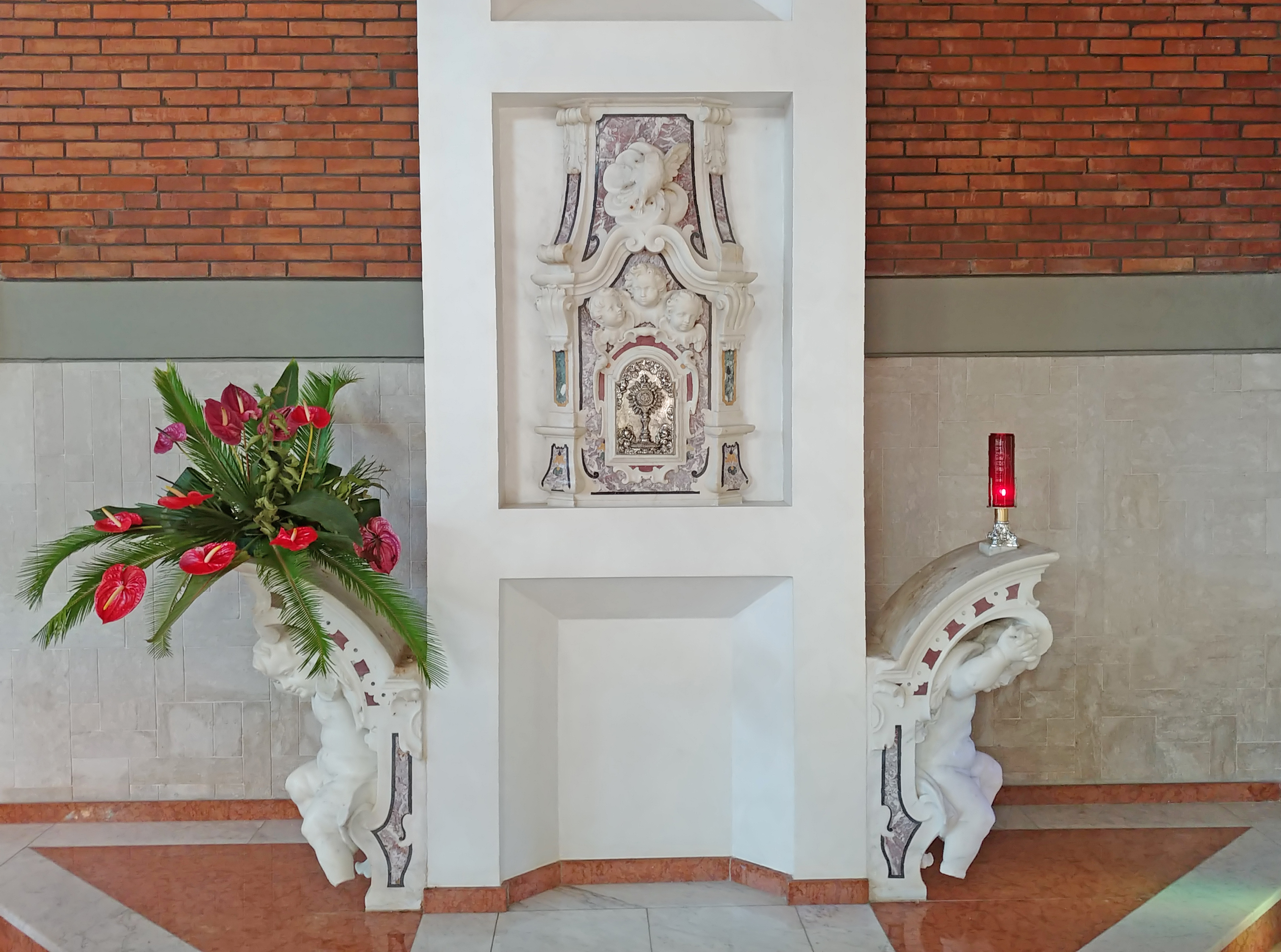
The tabernacle and head altar angels of the 18th-century high altar in their present arrangement, inside the church of San Paolo in Gaeta.

Following the suppression of religious orders in 1809, the following year the main Baroque furnishings of the church of St. Catherine were moved elsewhere at the behest of Vicar General Giuseppe Iannitti. The high altar, attributable to Domenico Antonio Vaccaro and dating back to 1705, was transferred to the church of St. Anthony Abbot together with its retablo and related altarpiece, a painting by Pietro Novelli depicting the Mystic Marriage of St. Catherine of Alexandria between Saints Augustine and Benedict, defined by Camillo Guerra as the work of Pietro Novelli, although the academic himself likens it to the style of Correggio. The church, which in 1838 became the seat of the parish of San Biagio, popularly assuming its name, suffered minor damage during World War II but was demolished in 1957 by the municipal administration for the opening of the Giovanni Caboto waterfront. Of the building, only the back wall of the apse was preserved along with the marble altarpiece (the canvases, however, were lost); the latter is articulated in a large central cornice supported by corbels, framed by a pair of composite pilasters and surmounted by a broken curvilinear tympanum, on either side of which are two smaller ones, each of which is decorated with an antefix (the present ones are the result of reconstruction, since the originals were stolen at the end of the 20th century); above the cymatium is the Dove of the Holy Spirit in the round, while below it is a cartouche with three angel heads and festoons. The mensa and the elevation, on the other hand, were dismembered: the tabernacle and the two altar-head angels were taken to the church of St. Paul the Apostle in Gaeta, and reassembled there to form a side altar; the remaining parts, however, found lodging in the church of San Magno near Fondi, from which they were later alienated. The tabernacle echoes, in its decorative apparatus, the subjects of the altarpiece: above the small arched doorway, in fact, are three angel heads, while higher up there is, against a background of clouds in relief, the dove of the Holy Spirit, partly mutilated; the entire piece is ornamented with scrolls and inlays; the altar-head angels had their feet amputated to facilitate their relocation.

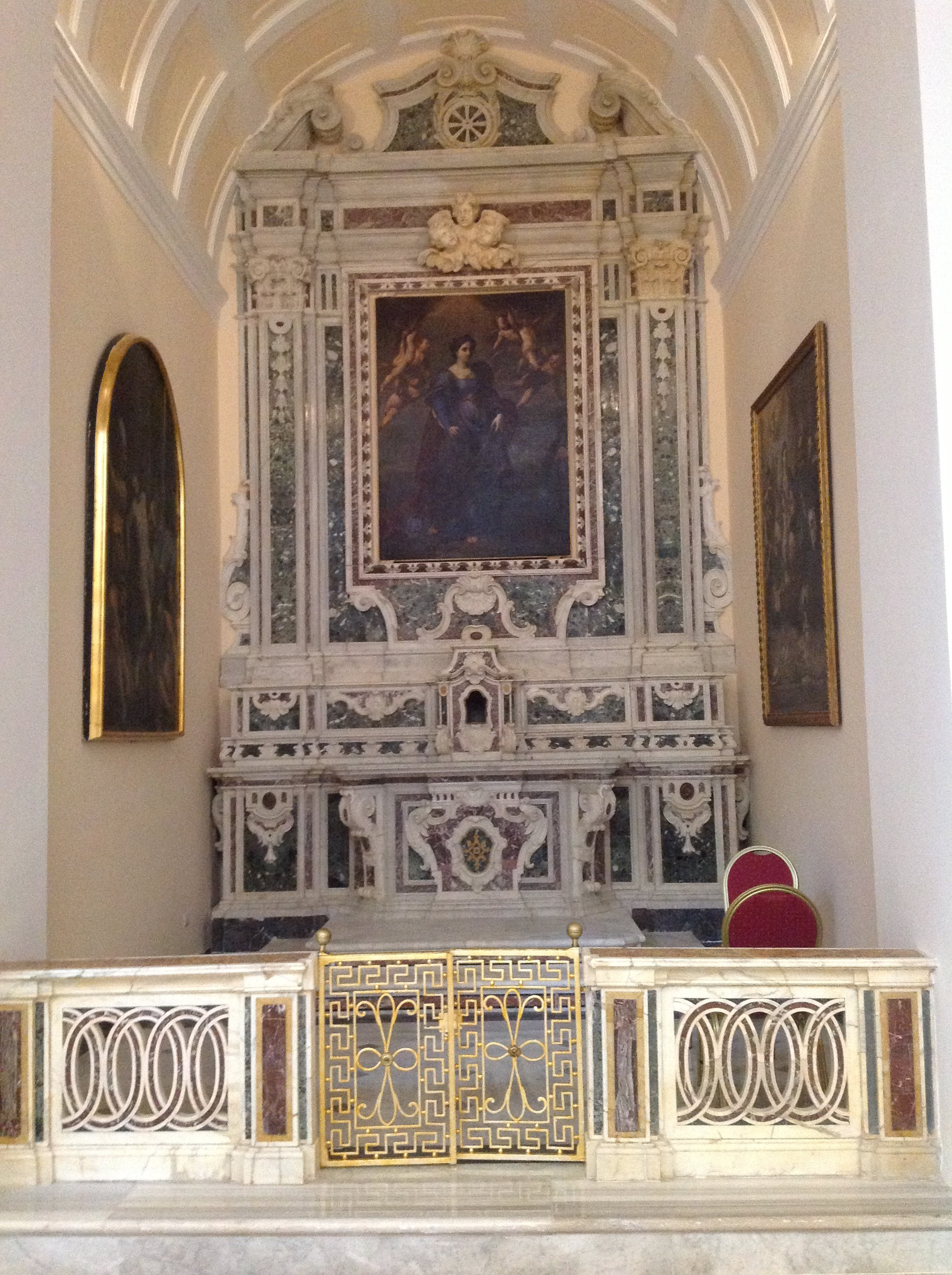
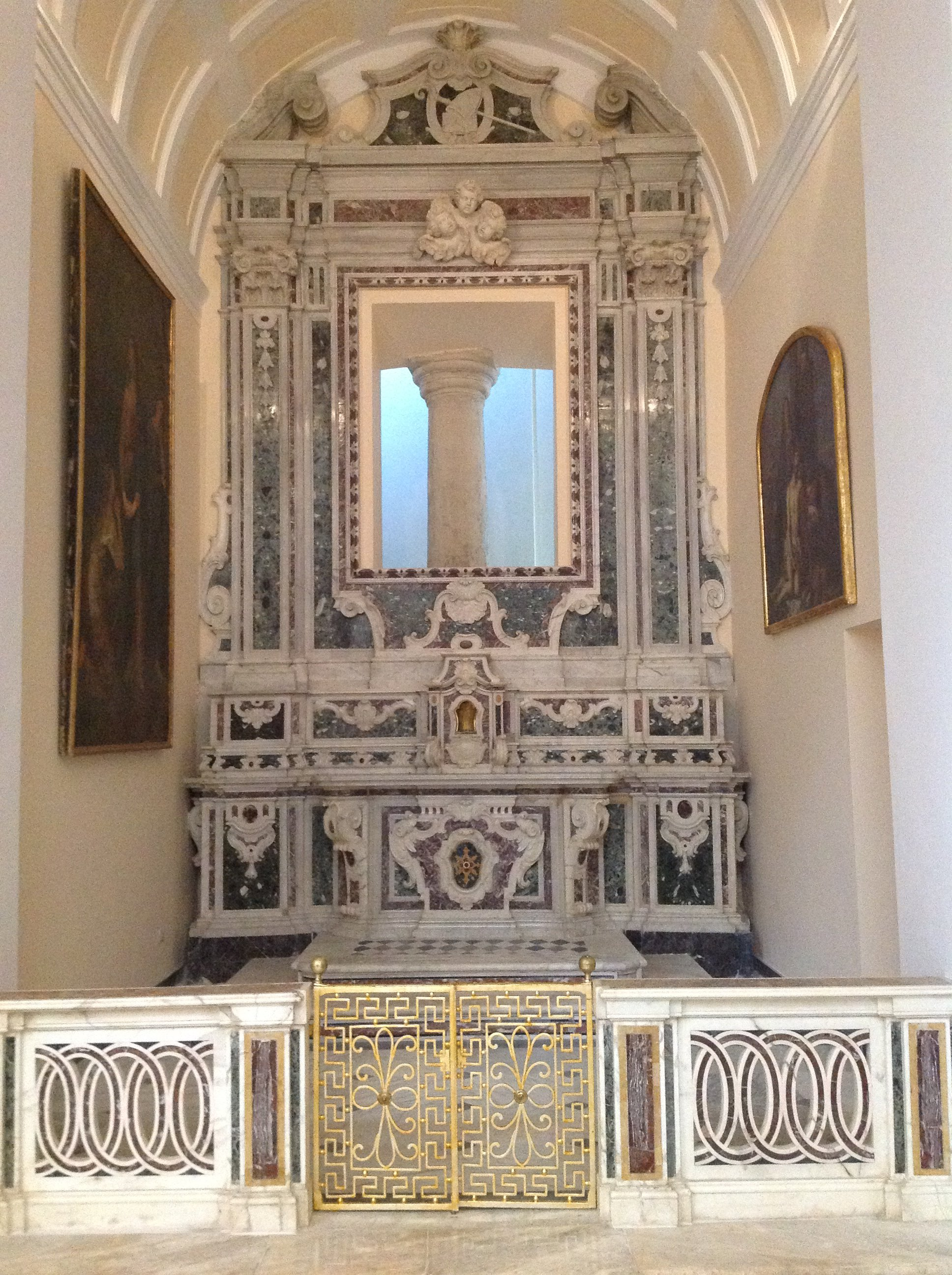
The Baroque side altars, currently in the first two right side chapels of Gaeta Cathedral.

The two contemporary Baroque side altars of St. Catherine, similar in ornamentation and workmanship to the high altar, were instead transported to the first two right side chapels of the cathedral of Saints Erasmus and Marcianus and St. Mary of the Assumption, made during the church's neoclassical interior renovation of 1788-1793. The two altars are identical: above the mensa and tabernacle, rises the altarpiece with an architrave ideally supported by two Corinthian pilasters placed at the ends; above the niche where the statue of St. Gabriel the Archangel once stood, finds place a sculptural group with three putti; in the center of the pediment, which forms the crowning of the artifact, a bas-relief depicting respectively the attributes of St. Bernard of Clairvaux (mitre, crosier and book, in the first chapel) and St. Catherine of Alexandria (breaking wheel, in the second chapel). For the altar of St. Bernard, presumably the same Domenico Antonio Vaccaro (attributed to Raffaello Causa) painted the altarpiece Madonna and Child Appearing to St. Bernard, which, with the opening of the diocesan museum of Gaeta in 1956, became part of the latter's exhibition. Currently in its place, a rectangular window opens in the center of the altarpiece, framing part of the rear reclaimed column, belonging to the medieval structure of the cathedral. On the altar of St. Catherine, on the other hand, there is the pre-existing canvas depicting the titular saint, an original work by Andrea Vaccaro datable to around 1660; the saint is depicted standing on the instruments of martyrdom, bearing the palm in her right hand and surrounded by little angels opening the cloud cover. This painting, too, was displayed in the diocesan museum beginning in 1956 and replaced in the cathedral with the Immaculate Virgin Appearing to the Souls in Purgatory by an anonymous local 18th-century painter, improperly attributed to Sebastiano Conca; it returned to its proper location in 2014.

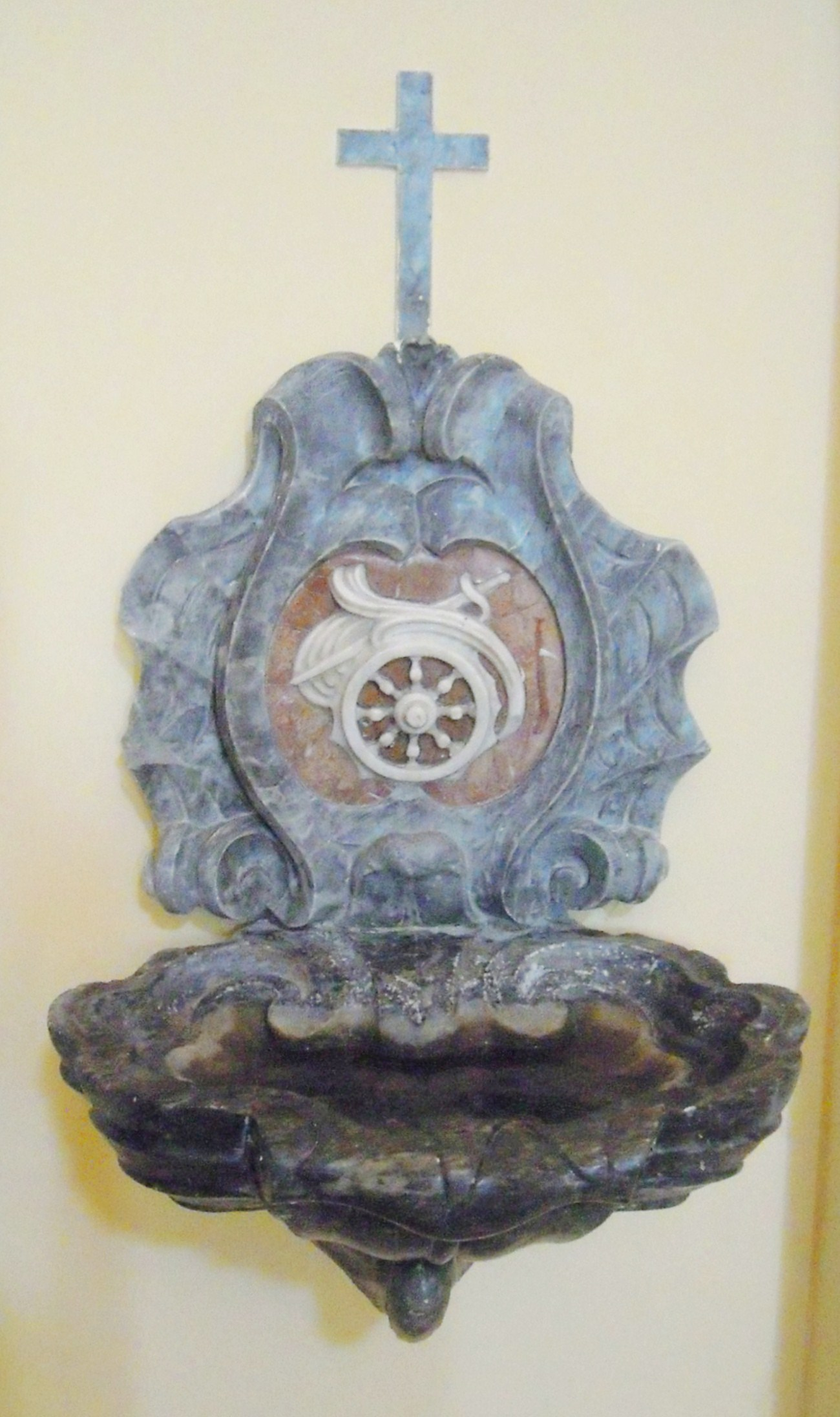
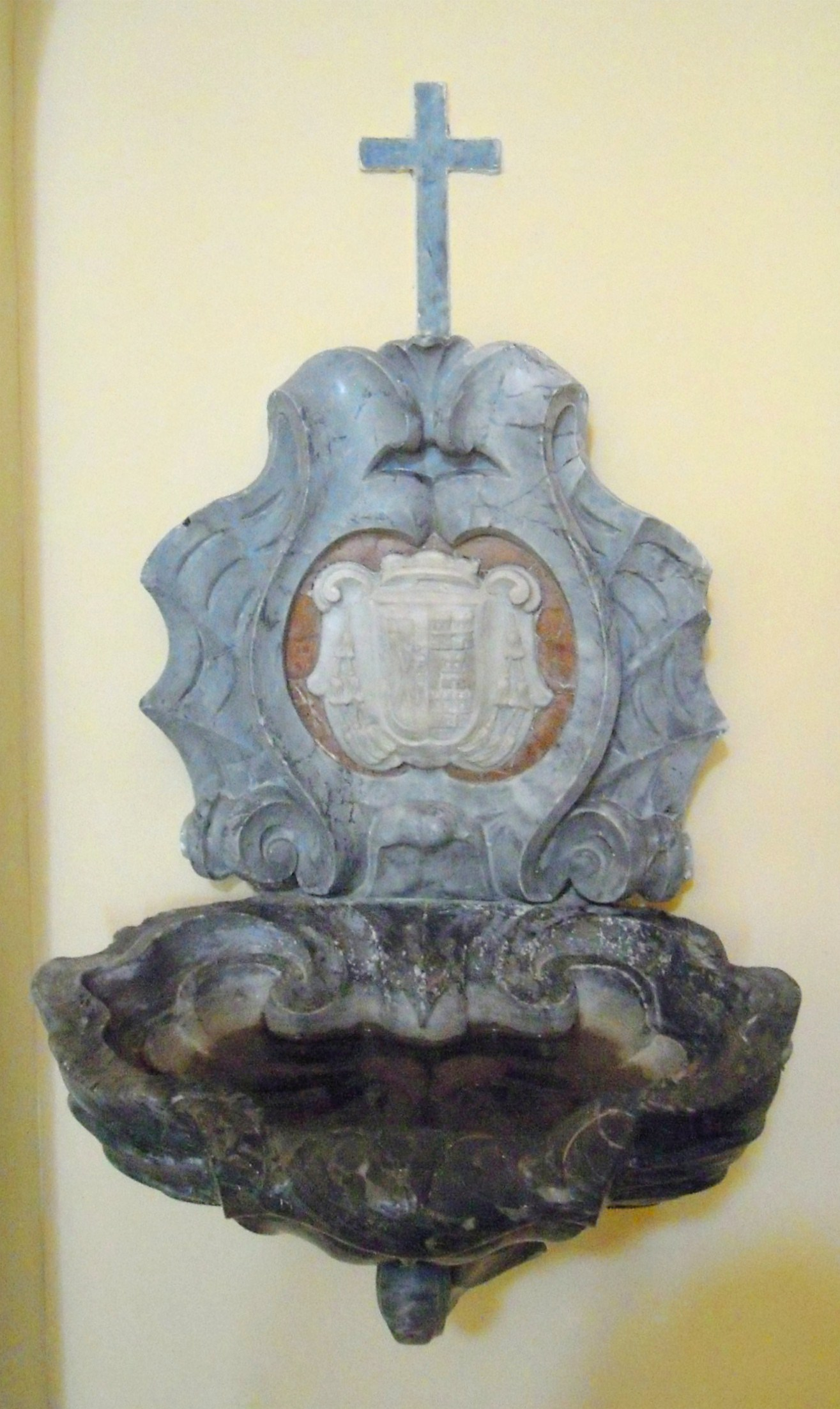
The eighteenth-century stoups, relocated to the church of St. James the Apostle in Gaeta.

In the church of San Giacomo Apostolo, which houses some furnishings from the vanished church of San Montano, there are other elements that were part of the Baroque apparatus of St. Catherine's. On the side walls of the modern apse, in a similar position as before the twentieth-century enlargement of the church, are two canvases painted in 1699 by Nicola Malinconico depicting respectively the Adoration of the Shepherds (left) and the Adoration of the Magi (right). Behind the counter-facade wall, on either side of the portal, are walled two stoups made of polychrome marble that are contemporary to the 18th-century altars; they consist of an inverted shell-shaped basin and a vertical element adorned with volutes, in the center of which are carved respectively on one the palm, the wheel and the sword (attributes of St. Catherine), on the other the coat of arms of the Bishop of Gaeta José Guerrero de Torres, O. E.S.A..

As part of the restoration and redevelopment work of 1852-1856, three paintings were specially made for the church of St. Catherine that were placed above the three altars made to replace the eighteenth-century ones, hung directly on the wall behind, without being placed inside an altarpiece; only for the one on the high altar was a stucco frame made. The canvases, in order to preserve them from deterioration, were then removed by the Historic Cultural Center “Gaeta” after the church was closed in 1987. The altarpiece of the high altar depicts the Martyrdom of St. Catherine and is the work of Gaetano Forte; it is a work of considerable size and since its transfer it has found its place behind the back wall of the third right side chapel of the cathedral of Saints Erasmus and Marcian and St. Mary of the Assumption, which has no altar. In the same room, along the left wall, the Martyrdom of St. Stephen, the work of an anonymous 18th-century Neapolitan artist, was exhibited until 2008, currently in the De Vio palace. On the side altars of the church of St. Catherine were placed, respectively, St. Francis of Paola by Giovanni Salomone and Our Lady of Good Counsel by Luigi Stanziani, also in the De Vio palace.

== See also ==
- Roman Catholic Archdiocese of Gaeta
- Churches of Gaeta
- Catherine of Alexandria

== Bibliography ==
- Pietro Rossetto (1689). Breve descrittione delle cose più notabili di Gaeta (in Italian) (3 ed.). Napoli: Domenico Antonio Parrino e Michele Luigi Mutii.
- Guerra, Camillo (1871). Artistiche osservazioni sulle antichità di Gaeta e Formia nella metà del 1855 in Atti della reale accademia di archeologia, lettere e belle arti (in Italian). Napoli: Stamperia della Reale Università. pp. 15–41.
- Giacomo Guarinelli (1853). Brevi cenni sulle costruzioni militari, civili ed ecclesiastiche eseguite in Gaeta dal 1835 ad oggi (in Italian). Napoli: Stabilimento tipografico di Gaetano Nobile.
- Onorato Gaetani d'Aragona (1885). Memorie storiche della città di Gaeta (in Italian) (2 ed.). Caserta: Stabilimento tipo-litografico della Minerva.
- Ferraro, Salvatore (1903). Memorie religiose e civili della città di Gaeta (in Italian). Napoli: Tipografia Francesco Giannini & Figli.
- Nicola Aletta (1931). Gaeta. Guida storico-artistico-archeologica (in Italian). Gaeta: Tipografia degli stabilimenti militari di pena.
- Luigi Salerno, ed. (1956). Il Museo Diocesano di Gaeta e mostra di opere restaurate nella provincia di Latina (in Italian). Gaeta: Ente Provinciale per il Turismo di Latina.
- Codex Diplomaticus Cajetanus (in Italian). Vol. III. Montecassino: Arcicenobio di Montecassino. 1958.
- Lidio Borgese (1967). Note sulla Chiesa di S. Giacomo in Gaeta (in Italian). Gaeta: La Poligrafica.
- Codex Diplomaticus Cajetanus (in Italian). Vol. I. Isola del Liri: Pisani. 1969 [1887].
- Giuseppe Fiengo (1971). Gaeta: monumenti e storia urbanistica (in Italian). Napoli: Edizioni scientifiche italiane.
- Giuseppe Allaria (1970). Le chiese di Gaeta (in Italian). Latina: Ente Provinciale per il Turismo.
- Capobianco, Paolo (1991). Studi e ricerche sul territorio di Gaeta (in Italian). Scauri: Il Golfo.
- Capobianco, Paolo (2000). I vescovi della Chiesa Gaetana (in Italian). Vol. II. Fondi: Arti Grafiche Kolbe.
- Fronzuto, Graziano (2001). Monumenti d'arte sacra a Gaeta: storia ed arte dei maggiori edifici religiosi di Gaeta (in Italian). Gaeta: Edizioni del Comune di Gaeta.
- Luigi Cardi, ed. (2003). Pio IX a Gaeta (25 novembre 1848-4 settembre 1849). Atti del convegno di studi per i 150 anni dell'avvenimento e dell'elevazione della diocesi di Gaeta ad arcidiocesi (13 dicembre 1998-24 ottobre 1999) (in Italian). Minturno: Caramanica.
- Daniela Concas; Cesare Crova; Graziella Frezza, eds. (2006). Le architetture religiose nel golfo di Gaeta. Scauri: Caliman Studio. ISBN 88-900982-1-1.
- Tallini, Gennaro (2006). Gaeta: una città nella storia (in Italian). Gaeta: Edizioni del Comune di Gaeta.
- Salvatore Boni (2008). Gaeta nello splendore della sua nobiltà e i suoi governatori (in Italian). Roma: Istituto Poligrafico dello Stato.
- Macaro, Carlo (2008). La Diocesi di Gaeta nel '700 (in Italian). Fondi: Tipolitografia C.O.R.E.
- Antonio Cesarale; Carlo Magliozzi; Pasquale Di Ciaccio (2010). Il catasto onciario di Gaeta (in Italian). Vol. I. Gaeta: Le Nuove Scelte.
- Tallini, Gennaro (2013). Vita quotidiana a Gaeta nell'età del viceregno spagnolo (in Italian). Gaeta: Centro Storico Culturale "Gaeta".
- Arcidiocesi di Gaeta, ed. (2014). Annuario Diocesano 2014 (PDF) (in Italian). Fondi: Arti grafiche Kolbe. Archived from the original (PDF) on 13 March 2016.
- Sorabella, Lino (2014). Ecclesia Mater. La Cattedrale di Gaeta (in Italian). Marina di Minturno: Caramanica Editore.
- Mario d'Onofrio; Manuela Gianandrea, eds. (2018). Gaeta medievale e la sua cattedrale (in Italian). Roma: Campisano.
