= Giuseppe Marsigli =

Italian painter

Giuseppe Marsigli (Naples, c. 1795 - circa 1835) was an Italian painter and engraver.

== Biography ==
He was a pupil of Costanzo Angelini in design, Giuseppe Cammarano in color. His brother Filippo Marsigli was also a painter. He participated in restorations in Naples. He engraved silverware. Marsgli was a friend of Vincenzo Bellini and a master of his mistress Maddalena Fumaroli.

Marsigli's Symposium of Centaurs (1831) is held in the collection of the Naples Archaeological Museum. He is known for his 19th century reproductions of paintings discovered at Pompeii.
