= Churches of Gaeta =

Churches of Gaeta, Italy

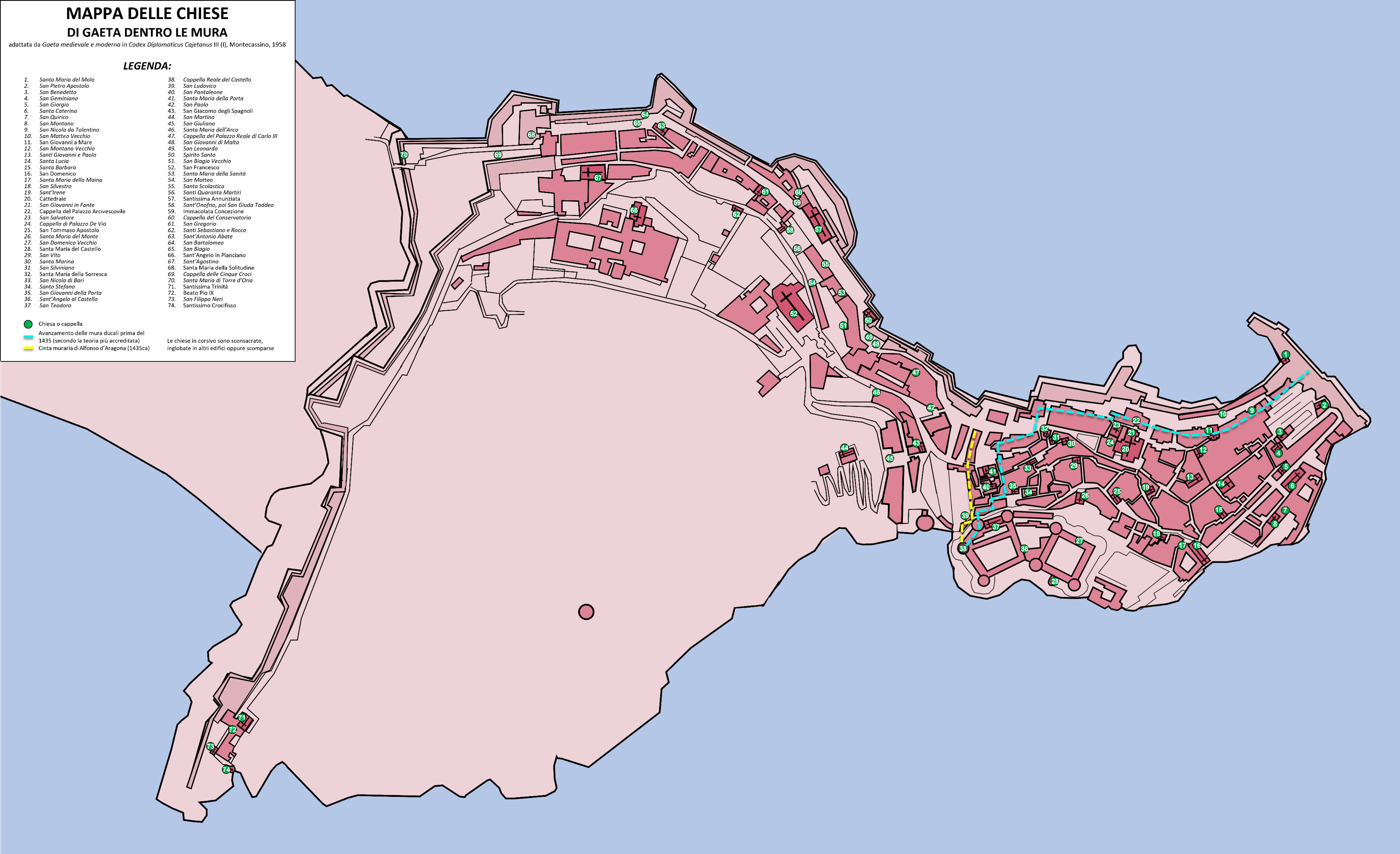
Map of Gaeta with the location of the churches inside the walls.

The churches of Gaeta are the Christian places of worship located within the boundaries of the present-day municipality of Gaeta, thus including both the town center and the surrounding area.

== History ==
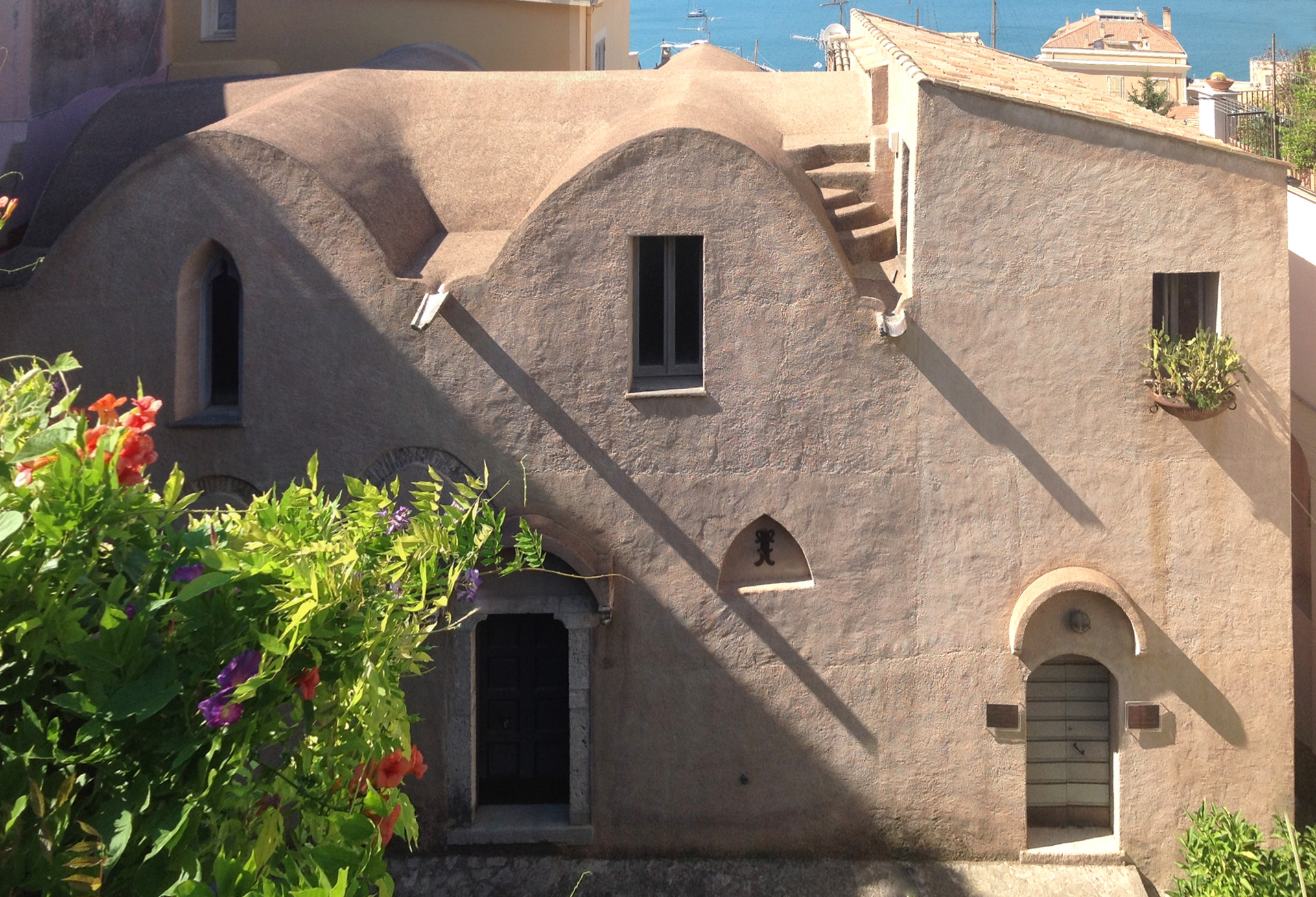
Exterior view of the former church of San Giovanni della Porta; its structure is typical of the city's secondary medieval places of worship, with a short single nave with two bays, preceded by a front section and ending with an apse (in this case non-protruding); moreover, the extradosed rib vault is an element common to most of the city's religious buildings.

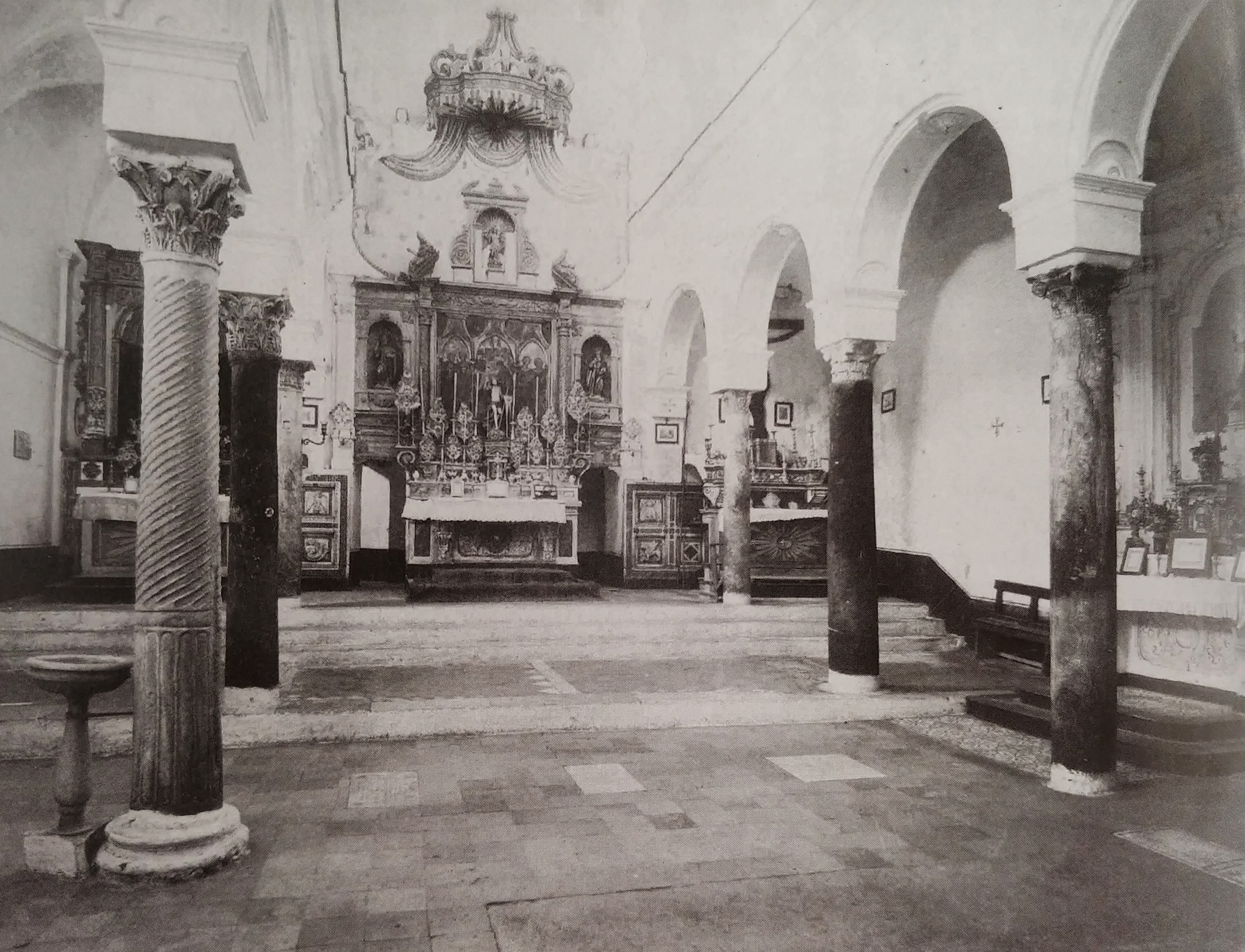
Interior of the former church of Santa Lucia in a photograph from the 1890s; founded in the 11th century and completed in the 13th, like many other churches in the city, it was embellished in the Baroque style between the 17th and 18th centuries, only to be replaced in the first half of the 20th century by a style closer to its hypothetical original form; Santa Lucia was one of the oldest parishes in Gaeta (the parish priest had the privilege of wearing the miter) and was the royal chapel during the stay in Gaeta of Ladislaus I, King of Naples (1387–1399).

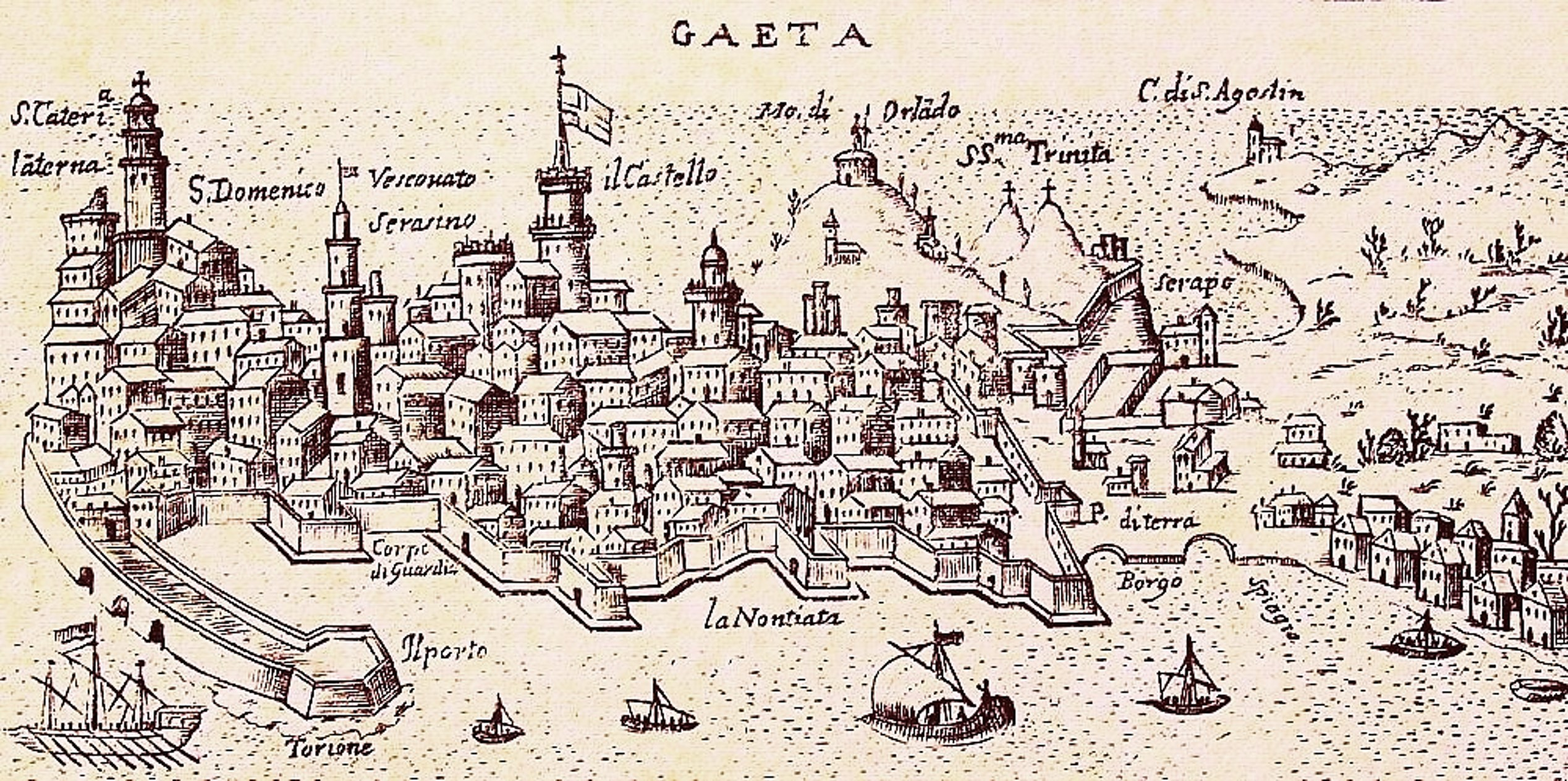
Seventeenth century view of Gaeta showing the main churches.

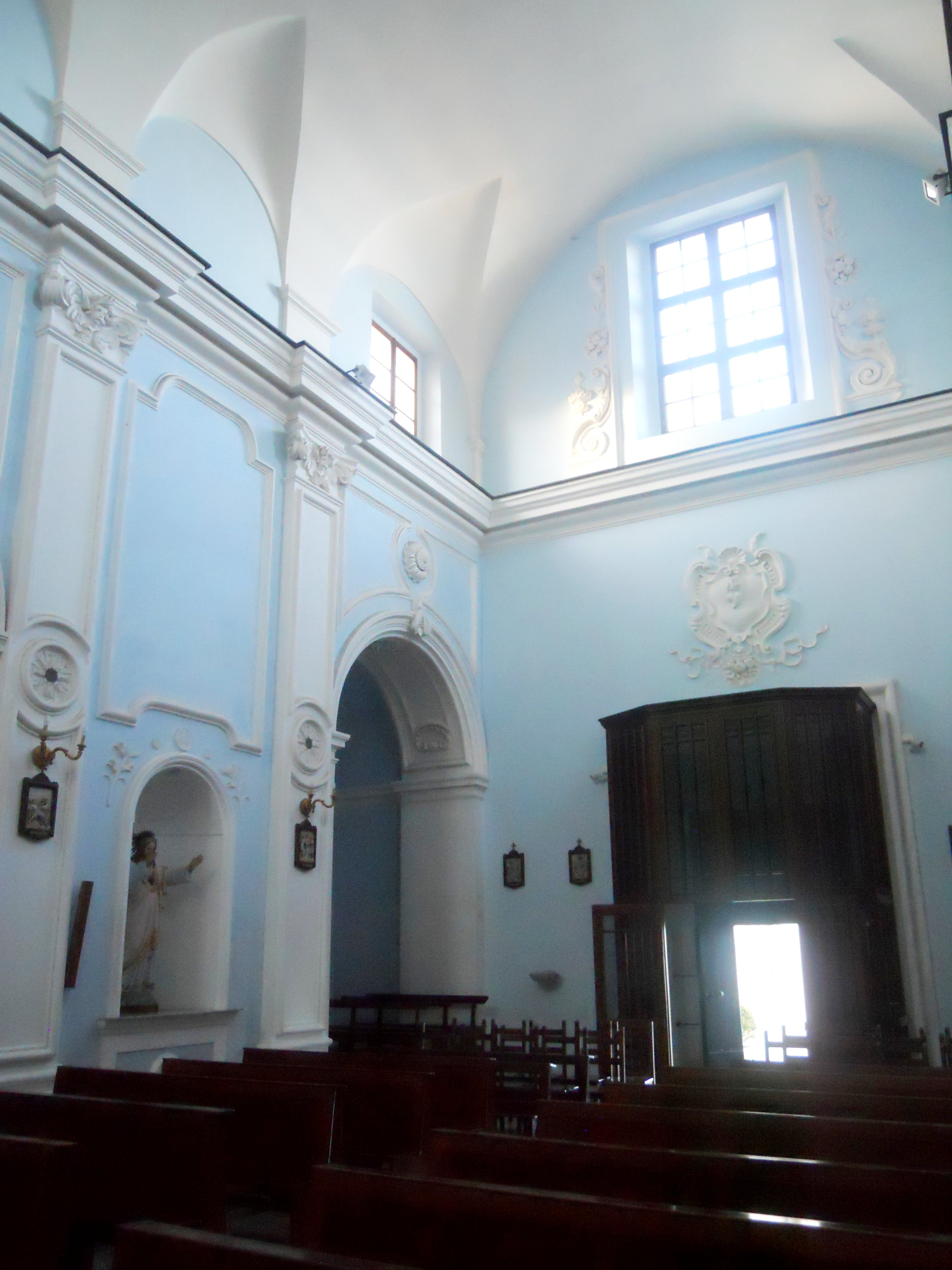
Interior view towards the counter-façade of the 17th century church of Santa Maria di Porto Salvo, in the Borgo: above the portal is the coat of arms of the Order of Discalced Augustinians who promoted its construction together with the adjoining convent and officiated it until its suppression in 1809.

The first Christian communities in Gaeta, like those in nearby Formia, appeared no earlier than the end of the 3rd century. During this period, the first bishop of Formia, Erasmus, preached in the area. This must have had an effect on Gaeta, since, according to hagiographies, the former soldier Ephysius, who had converted to Christianity, was baptized there during those same years.

The size of the town - and of the Christian community - was still modest at the time. A turning point came in the 6th century with the Gothic War and the subsequent Lombard invasion when the major Roman centers in the area were sacked or destroyed. In this context, the populations of the nearby Roman cities in the terminal part of the Gaetan peninsula began to migrate in a defensive manner. Within two and a half centuries, with the growth of this last settlement, the episcopal see of Formia (which had already absorbed that of Minturno) was transferred, first de facto and then de jure, to Gaeta.

The first mention of a church in Gaeta dates back to 604: the church of San Giorgio, built at least 20 years earlier in the upper part of the castrum. San Giorgio was one of the four parishes traditionally considered the oldest in the city, together with Santa Maria in Pensulis, San Pietro and San Tommaso. The four parish priests had the right to wear a miter and walk next to the bishop in processions at least until the 16th century. San Pietro still retained the privilege of the mitred prior at the end of the 18th century.

Other churches that probably appeared in the 7th century are San Lorenzo, Santa Scolastica and Santa Maria del Parco. The first was located in a farmhouse in the Pontone valley, called Massa Laurenziana, owned by the Patrimony of St. Peter; the second was a very ancient grange of the Abbey of Montecassino; the third was chosen as a refuge around 842 by the Bishop of Formia, who also hid the relics of the Formian saints there for fear of Saracen plundering. Between 760 and 780, the area was enclosed by a new circle of walls, from which the name "de parcu" may derive.

The churches of San Salvatore, initially outside the walls, and Santi Cosma e Damiano, in a new village over 2 km from the walled city, can be dated to between the end of the 8th and the beginning of the 9th century.

During the 9th century the parishes of Santa Maria fuori Porta, San Silviniano, Santa Irene and the monasteries of San Teodoro and Sant'Angelo in Planciano were built. In the 10th century the parishes of Santi Giovanni e Paolo, San Nicola, San Giovanni a Mare, Santa Barbara were founded, as well as the convents of Santa Maria and San Quirico (also parishes) and the churches of San Giacomo (later degli Spagnoli), San Giovanni in Fonte and Santa Maria del Molo. After the year 1000 and for the next four centuries, churches were built continuously, with more intense phases corresponding to periods of greater economic prosperity in the city.

During the reigns of Ladislaus and his sister Joanna, Gaeta reached the height of its splendor, becoming the second capital of the Kingdom of Naples. The number of functioning religious buildings was also considerable: by 1420 there were 21 parishes within the walls (in an area of less than 15 hectares) and 6 outside, 3 Benedictine monasteries for women and 3 for men with their respective outbuildings, 1 Cistercian abbey, 2 Franciscan convents, 1 Dominican and 1 Augustinian, 2 Carthusian granges and about twenty other churches and chapels.

With the advent of the Aragonese period, economic growth came to a halt and the population decreased slightly. In 1440 the parish of San Ludovico was transferred to Santa Maria di Porta, the original church having been demolished for military reasons. In 1481 some churches were suppressed and united to the Cathedral Chapter by Bishop Francesco Patrizi: Santi Cosma e Damiano in Gaeta, San Pantaleone, Santa Marina, Sant'Ambrogio del Monte and Santa Maria di Casaregola.

The most dramatic decline, in every sense, occurred during the Italian wars of 1494–1504, which the people of Gaeta experienced firsthand. The looting carried out by French soldiers in June 1495 mainly affected the rich churches of Gaeta, which were devastated and deprived of precious ornaments and votive offerings accumulated over the centuries.

In the 16th century, the construction of ramparts and the consequent sharp reduction in commercial activities contributed to the depopulation of Gaeta in favor of its Borgo. The overabundance of parishes in the walled city became evident to the ecclesiastical authorities, who decreed the unification of numerous parishes during the course of the century. The first parish to be abolished - it is not known exactly when - was that of Santo Stefano. In 1519, on the initiative of the then bishop Cardinal De Vio, San Salvatore was suppressed and annexed to the cathedral with a bull issued by Pope Leo X. The merger was confirmed by a bull issued by Clement VII in 1530. In 1550, by brief of Julius II, the parish of San Geminiano or Santi Lucia e Geminiano was incorporated into that of Santa Barbara. Six parishes propter earum vicinitatem quommodo superfluae were suppressed in 1569 by a bull of Pius V: San Giorgio, Santa Irene, San Silviniano, Santi Giovanni e Paolo, San Vito, San Silvestro; the decision was confirmed by a bull issued by Gregory XIII in 1575. There was more or less strong opposition from parish priests and the faithful, since a papal decree was needed each time to confirm the abolition.

Between the end of the 16th century and the beginning of the 17th century, however, three new parishes were established in the village: San Giacomo in 1571, San Carlo in 1620, and San Sergio in 1638. The construction of churches and chapels, especially Marian ones, received a new impulse during the period of the Counter-Reformation. New religious orders appeared on a scene that was still dominated by Benedictines, Cistercians and Conventual Franciscans: Camillians, Capuchins, Piarists and Discalced Augustinians.

In the early 1700s the number of consecrated churches was again very high. In the report of the pastoral visit of April 9, 1725, Bishop Carlo Pignatelli noted with some satisfaction that in the city enclosed within the walls, where 2,996 people lived, there were 35 churches, including 11 parishes and 6 monasteries. The village, with its 6,814 inhabitants, had 4 parishes, 3 monasteries and several other rural churches and chapels.

In the second half of the 18th century there was a decline in the number of priests, religious and active churches, which was accompanied by a certain demographic and economic stagnation. The "death blow" to religious activities was dealt by the ten-year French government, which abolished several parishes and almost all the monasteries in the city. The churches of Gaeta, reduced in number and almost all in a poor state of repair, enjoyed a new period of prosperity during the nine months that Pius IX was exiled in the city and in the following years, when by order of Ferdinand II many churches were restored or rebuilt and some chapels were built from scratch.

With the unification of Italy the situation for the churches, particularly those pertaining to religious orders, worsened again with the anticlerical laws. Despite this, the demographic growth prevented a reduction in the number of parishes, which remained at 8 throughout the century.

The parish of San Giovanni a Mare was merged with the Cathedral in the first decades of the 20th century. The parish of San Biagio effectively ceased to exist around 1955, when its church was demolished; de jure it was never suppressed. The parish of San Pietro was officially assigned to the church of San Giovanni della Porta in 1895, then passed to San Domenico in 1930 and was finally suppressed at the end of the 70s. The parish of Santa Lucia was transferred to Santa Caterina and then merged with the Cathedral in 1987.

The traditional three parishes of San Giacomo, Santi Cosma e Damiano and San Carlo still exist in the Borgo. With the economic boom and population growth of the 1960s, two new parishes were established: San Nilo in 1963 and San Paolo in 1964. Finally, in 1986 the parish of Santo Stefano was nominally established, but the inauguration of the church only took place in 2014. The number of parishes is therefore seven.

With the recent abandonment of the Addolorata convent by the Crucified Adorers of the Eucharist nuns, only two regular religious complexes remain: the Holy Trinity (PIME) and Our Lady of Mercy (SMMP). The number of churches open for worship is obviously limited to these and a few other churches. Despite the neglect and damage suffered during the Second World War, however, numerous churches throughout the territory are still visible and sometimes open to visitors.

== Legend ==
In order to compile a complete list, the Christian places of worship in the city were systematically divided into two parts ("inside the walls" and "outside the walls") and into different categories. Determining the taxonomy of the churches is rather problematic; in this respect, a more complex classification, postponed to the traditional name, was preferred to a generic prefix "ex". Deconsecrated churches (existing and non-existing) are indicated in italics. Similarly, the heading "church of" or "chapel of" has generally been avoided, and for simplicity only the titular and any changes over time are given. Apparent repetitions are due to rebuilding at another site or to homonymy. Another problematic aspect is the distinction between churches and chapels, which could lead to the latter being considered "improper" churches and irrelevant to the purpose of the list. The distinction is historically unstable and not easily based on dimensional or functional criteria, as evidenced by the frequent expression chiesa seu cappella ("either church or chapel").

== Catholic places of worship ==
=== Places of worship inside the city walls ===
Name	Location	Foundation	Last significant interventions	Prevailing architectural style	Current status	Notes	Image
Santissima Addolorata formerly San Raffaele originally San Gregorio	Via Annunziata, 42; 41°13′N 13°35′E	14th century	1855	Neoclassical	Not officiated	Home of the confraternity of San Gregorio until 1771, then annexed to a convent of the Mantellate Sisters of Mary (until 1906) and later of the Crucified Sisters Adorers of the Eucharist (until 2015)	
Sant'Agostino	Via Begani; 41.2129017°N 13.5770324°E	1421	?	?	Vanished	Annexed to an Augustinian convent and seat of the confraternity of Santa Monica until 1809	
Sant'Angelo al Castello	Salita Castello; 41.2075279°N 13.5852037°E	1230	?	?	Vanished	Annexed to a Dominican monastery until 1308	
Sant'Angelo in Planciano	Via della Breccia; 41.2125762°N 13.5783485°E	Before 899	1851	Neoclassical	Not officiated	Annexed to a Benedictine monastery for monks that was suppressed in 1809	
Santissima Annunziata	Via Annunziata, 21; 41.2114827°N 13.5804181°E	1321	17th century	Baroque	Officiated	Annexed to the Santissima Annunziata complex, a sanctuary since 2009	
Sant'Antonio Abate also known as San Biagio	Lungomare Caboto; 41.2134828°N 13.5788584°E	Around 1200	18th century	Baroque	Vanished, only the back wall of the apse remains	Originally belonging to the order of Saint Anthony, since 1838 the seat of the parish of San Biagio and the confraternity of Santa Monica	
Santa Barbara	Salita Chiaromonte; 41.2081019°N 13.588762°E	Before 1002	?	Romanesque	Incorporated into other buildings	Formerly the seat of the parish of the same name	
San Bartolomeo	Lungomare Caboto; 41.213605°N 13.578445°E	Before 1409	?	?	Vanished	Owned by the Maltacea family until 1409, then by the Gattola family Seat of the confraternity of the same name	
San Benedetto	Via Pio IX; 41.2090912°N 13.589546°E	Before 887	14th century	Romanesque	Partially collapsed, in a state of neglect	Parish suppressed in 1810	
San Biagio Vecchio	Piazza Sebastiano Conca; 41.2104347°N 13.5820412°E	Before 1028	1623	?	Vanished	Parish transferred to the new church of San Biagio in 1695	
San Biagio	Lungomare Caboto; 41.213505°N 13.578180°E	1695	?	?	Vanished	Home to the parish of the same name and the confraternity of Santa Monica until 1838	
San Biagio (temporary)	Via Annunziata; 41.2126431°N 13.5801688°E	?	?	?	Rooms on the ground floor of the Royal Palace of Ferdinand II	Provisional seat of the parish of San Biagio in the 1950s and at the beginning of the following century	
Santa Caterina d'Alessandria	Via Pio IX, 41; 41.2082212°N 13.5895333°E	14th century	1855	Neoclassical	Not officiated	Annexed to a Benedictine convent until 1451, then a Cistercian convent suppressed in 1809; seat of the parish of Santa Lucia from 1972 to 1987	
Cappella delle Cinque Croci	Lungomare Caboto; 41.2128543°N 13.5753226°E	Around 1850	?	Neo-Gothic	Vanished	At the foot of the Cappelletti bastion	
Cappella del Conservatorio	Via Annunziata; 41.2123437°N 13.5810019°E	1321	17th century	Baroque	Deconsecrated	Inside the Santissima Annunziata complex	
Cappella del Palazzo Reale di Carlo III	Via Faustina; 41.209885°N 13.583182°E	18th century			Vanished		
Santi Cosma e Damiano	?	?	?	?	Vanished	Parish merged with Santa Marina before 1425	
Santissimo Crocifisso	Via Santissima Trinità; 41.2058618°N 13.5710862°E	16th century	?	Baroque	Not officiated	Inside the Santissima Trinità complex	
San Curcio	?	Before 1306	?	?	Vanished		
San Domenico Vecchio	Salita Castello; 41.2078658°N 13.5860918°E	1222	?	Romanesque	Vanished	Annexed to a Dominican convent suppressed in 1308	
San Domenico	Via Aragonese, 1; 41°13′N 13°35′E	1308	1449	Gothic	Occasionally officiated	Annexed to a Dominican convent and seat of the parish of the same name and of the Confraternity of the Rosary until 1809; seat of the parish of San Pietro from 1930 until its suppression at the end of the 1970s	
Santi Erasmo e Marciano e Santa Maria Assunta formerly Santa Maria del Parco	Via Duomo, 24; 41°13′N 13°35′E	7th-9th century	1788-1793 (interior); 1903-1950 (exterior)	Romanesque (bell tower); Neo-Gothic (façade); Baroque-Neoclassical (interior)	Officiated	Cathedral and minor basilica, seat of the parishes of Santa Maria Assunta and San Biagio	
San Filippo Neri formerly Santi Anna e Nicola	Via Santissima Trinità; 41.2058618°N 13.5710862°E	16th century	After 1698	Baroque	Deconsecrated	Inside the Santissima Trinità complex	
San Francesco	Via San Giovanni Bosco, 1; 41°13′N 13°35′E	1283	1870	Neo-Gothic	Officiated	Order of Friars Minor then Society of Saint Francis de Sales until 1992	
San Geminiano or Santi Lucia e Geminiano	Between the church of San Benedetto and that of Santa Caterina d'Alessandria; 41.208737°N 13.589473°E	Before 1306	?	?	Vanished	Seat of the parish of the same name, suppressed in 1550	
San Giovanni a Mare	Via Bausan, 26 41°13′N 13°35′E	11th century	13th century	Romanesque	Officiated	Seat of the parish of the same name, suppressed at the beginning of the 20th century, previously the seat of the archconfraternity of San Giuseppe since 1628	
San Giovanni de Folle	?	Before 1393	?	?	Vanished		
San Giovanni della Porta	Via San Giovanni, 5 41°13′N 13°35′E	10th century	19th century	Gothic	Deconsecrated	Entrusted to the Benedictine monks until the 14th century, a dependency of the monastery of Santi Teodoro e Martino until 1436 and of that of Sant'Angelo in Planciano until 1788; seat of the parish of the same name since 1436, and of that of San Pietro from 1805 to 1930, before the latter was transferred to San Domenico	
San Giovanni di Malta	Via Faustina; 41.2102258°N 13.5825049°E	1225	?	?	Vanished	Belonging to the Sovereign Military Order of Malta	
Santi Giovanni e Paolo then Santa Maria dell'Orazione e Morte	Via Regina Maria Sofia; 41.2084302°N 13.5854577°E	Before 954	17th-18th century	Baroque	Deconsecrated, rebuilt in contemporary forms	Seat of the parish of the same name suppressed in 1569, and from 1560 of the confraternity of the Neri or of Santa Maria dell'Orazione e Morte	
San Giovanni in Fonte	Piazza Papa Gelasio; 41.2090483°N 13.586981°E	Before 1003	?	Romanesque	Vanished	Baptistery of the cathedral	
San Giorgio	Salita Chiaromonte; 41.2084786°N 13.5890761°E	Before 604	?	Romanesque	Vanished	Seat of the "mitred" parish of the same name, suppressed in 1569	
San Giuda Taddeo	Via Angioina, 40; 41.2118602°N 13.5802488°E	1855		Neo-Gothic	Deconsecrated		
San Giuliano	Via de Lieto; 41.209419°N 13.582070°E	?	?	?	Vanished		
Immacolata Concezione or Cappella d'Oro	Via Annunziata, 21; 41.2119256°N 13.5809385°E	1321	1513	Renaissance	Deconsecrated	Inside the Santissima Annunziata complex	
Sant'Irene	Salita della Colonna; 41.20831°N 13.58723°E	Before 609	?	Romanesque	Vanished	Seat of the parish of the same name, suppressed in 1569	
San Leonardo	Via Faustina; 41.2102258°N 13.5825049°E	1225	?	?	Vanished	Belonging to the Sovereign Military Order of Malta	
San Ludovico or San Luise	Via Angioina; 41.2079905°N 13.5837849°E	Before 1390	?	?	Vanished	Seat of the parish of the same name, transferred in 1440 to the church of Santa Maria della Porta	
Santa Lucia formerly Santa Maria in Pensulis	Via Ladislao, 27 41°12′30″N 13°35′20″E	11th century	13th century	Romanesque	Deconsecrated	Home of the "mitred" parish of the same name, transferred in 1972 to Santa Caterina d'Alessandria, and of the confraternity of San Filippo Neri	
Madonna della Solitudine or della Soledad	Lungomare Caboto; 41.2131939°N 13.5756749°E	1628		Baroque	Occasionally officiated	Inside Porta Carlo V	
Santa Maria dell'Arco	Via Angioina; 41.209766°N 13.582169°E	?	?	?	Vanished	Patronage of the Antoniani family	
Santa Maria del Castello	Salita Castello; 41.207423°N 13.5846876°E	Around 1820	?	Neoclassical	Officiated	Military chaplaincy of the Nautical School of the Guardia di Finanza	
Santa Maria della Maina	Via Aragonese; 41.2076001°N 13.5877181°E	?	12th century	Romanesque	Vanished, but the bell tower, incorporated in the convent of San Domenico, still exists	Annexed to a Benedictine convent until 1438, it was the seat of the parish of the same name, which was transferred in the 1440s to the subsequent church of San Domenico	
Santa Maria del Monte	Via Aragonese; 41.208182°N 13.58615°E	14th century	20th century	Baroque	Deconsecrated	Formerly a hermitage	
Santa Maria della Porta or fuori Porta also known as San Ludovico or San Luise	Piazza Commestibili; 41.2087460°N 13.5843026°E	Before 899	?	?	Vanished	Formerly the seat of the parish of the same name, from 1440 the seat of the parish of St. Louis, transferred in 1773 to the church of the Holy Spirit	
Santa Maria della Sanità or San Camillo	Via Faustina; 41.2112496°N 13.5816708°E	1617	1673	Baroque	Vanished	Annexed to the convent of the Camillians, suppressed in 1806	
Santa Maria della Sorresca	Via Duomo, 2; 41.20907°N 13.5854471°E	1617	19th century	Baroque	Not officiated		
Santa Maria di Torre d'Oria e San Gaetano	Lungomare Caboto; 41.2131444°N 13.5741512°E	Before 1600	?	Baroque	Vanished	Seat of the parish of the same name, suppressed in 1707	
Santa Marina or Santa Marinella	Via degli Albito; 41.2090343°N 13.5855106°E	?	?	?	Vanished	Seat of the parish of the same name existing before 1443	
San Martino	Via Santa Maria Ausiliatrice; 41.2089544°N 13.5818289°E	?	?	Gothic	Deconsecrated	Annexed to the monastery first of the Benedictine monks, then of the Carthusian monks; under the patronage of the Gaetani family of Castelmola.	
San Matteo Vecchio	Via Bausan; 41.2092997°N 13.5884692°E	Before 1100	?	?	Vanished	Owned by the Baraballo family until 1528, then by the Gattola family	
San Matteo	Via Angioina; 41.211228°N 13.581186°E	After 1536	?	?	Vanished	Patronage of the Gattola family	
San Montano	Via Nazario Sauro; 41.2078349°N 13.5891658°E	1673	?	Baroque	Vanished	Annexed to the monastery of the Franciscan Tertiaries until 1809	
San Montano Vecchio	Piazza Cavallo; 41.2089137°N 13.5878214°E	?	?	Gothic	Vanished		
Natività di Maria or dell'Ulivo formerly San Giacomo degli Spagnoli	Via Angioina; 41.2134673°N 13.5778293°E	Before 1000	1854	Baroque	Not officiated	Formerly the seat of the arch-confraternity of the Bianchi or dell'Ulivo	
San Nicola di Bari	Salita degli Albito 41°12′30″N 13°35′20″E	Before 958	14th century	Gothic	Partially collapsed, in a state of neglect	Seat of the parish of the same name, suppressed in 1809	
San Nicola da Tolentino	Via Bausan; 41.2094325°N 13.5890156°E	1606	?	?	Vanished	Patronage of the Oliva family Formerly Seat of the Nobles of the City	
Sant'Onofrio	Via Angioina; 41.2118602°N 13.5802488°E	1489	?	?	Vanished		
Cappella del Palazzo Arcivescovile	Via Docibile; 41.2092745°N 13.5869712°E	1723	2013	Contemporary	Officiated	In the Archbishop's palace	
Cappella di Palazzo De Vio	Piazza Cardinale De Vio; 41.2089984°N 13.5863117°E	2010s		Contemporary	Not officiated	In Palazzo De Vio, a diocesan seminary from 1771 to the 1960s, originally the Bishop's Palace	
San Pantaleone	Salita Beccheria; 41.2085085°N 13.5845956°E	?	?	?	Vanished		
San Paolo	Salita Casa Tosti; 41.2095448°N 13.5831778°E	Before 1357	?	?	Vanished	A dependency of Sant'Angelo in Planciano, then leased to the Antoniani family for use as a private oratory	
San Pietro Apostolo or del Porto	Via Pio IX; 41.2093369°N 13.5902567°E	Before 954	?	?	Vanished	Seat of the "mitred" parish of the same name, transferred to San Giovanni della Porta in 1805	
Beato Pio IX	Via Santissima Trinità; 41.2058618°N 13.5710862°E	Second half of the 19th century	?	Rococo	Not officiated	Inside the sanctuary of the Holy Trinity	
Santi Quaranta Martiri	Via Annunziata; 41.2118232°N 13.5807392°E	?	?	?	Vanished		
San Quirico	Via Nazario Sauro; 41.207785°N 13.5886518°E	Before 1024	?	?	Vanished	Annexed to a monastery of Benedictine nuns until the second half of the 15th century, then a convent of Franciscan Tertiaries Formerly the seat of the parish of the same name	
Cappella Reale del Castello Inferiore	Via Angioina; 41.207601°N 13.5838491°E	1850	?	Neoclassical	Deconsecrated	In the west tower of the Lower Castle	
Cappella Reale del Castello Superiore	Salita Castello; 41.207317°N 13.58616°E	Around 1445	?	Gothic	Vanished	In the eastern curtain wall of the Upper Castle	
Santa Reparata	?	Before 1393	?	?	Vanished		
San Salvatore then San Giacomo degli Italiani	Vicolo Caetani 41°13′N 13°35′E	Early 11th century	16th century	Baroque	Partially collapsed, converted into a multi-purpose space	Seat of the parish of the same name, suppressed in 1519	
Santa Scolastica	Via Faustina; 41.211531°N 13.581375°E	Before 600	?	?	Vanished	A dependency of the Abbey of Montecassino, once the seat of the confraternity of Santa Maria della Neve or Santa Scolastica	
Santi Sebastiano e Rocco	Via Angioina; 41.2121341°N 13.58002°E	14th century	Around 1650	Gothic	Deconsecrated	Formerly the seat of the confraternity of the same name	
San Silvestro	Via Aragonese, Vico I 41.2078195°N 13.587187°E	Before 1186	?	Romanesque	Incorporated into other buildings	Seat of the parish of the same name, suppressed in 1569	
San Silviniano	Salita degli Albito; 41.2089233°N 13.5851324°E	Before 903	?	Romanesque	Incorporated into other buildings	Seat of the parish of the same name, suppressed in 1569	
Spirito Santo	Piazza Livio Bonelli; 41.2108918°N 13.5822822°E	14th century	1771	Gothic	Vanished	Formerly the seat of the confraternity of the Holy Spirit and from 1771 that of St. Gregory; from 1773 the seat of the parish of St. Louis	
Santo Stefano	Via San Giovanni; 41.2138232°N 13.5627409°E	Before 1384	?	Gothic	Incorporated into other buildings	Formerly the seat of the parish of the same name	
Santi Teodoro e Martino or San Teodoro	Via Angioina; 41.207891°N 13.5844685°E	Before 906	Around 1445	Gothic	Incorporated into the Angevin castle	Annexed to a Benedictine monastery until 1436	
Santissimo Rosario then San Tommaso Apostolo	Via Aragonese, 28; 41.2080409°N 13.5869634°E	Before 1135	17th-18th century	Baroque	Officiated	Seat of the "mitred" parish of the same name until 1809, seat of the Confraternity of the Rosary from 1809 onwards	
Santissima Trinità	Via Santissima Trinità, 3; 41.2055162°N 13.5704602°E	Before 1000	17th century	Baroque	Officiated	First attached to the Benedictine Monastery, then to the Order of Friars Minor, and now to the Pontifical Institute for Foreign Missions.	
San Vito	Salita degli Albito; 41.2086522°N 13.5859717°E	Before 1262	?	?	Vanished	Seat of the parish of the same name, suppressed in 1569	

=== Places of worship outside the city walls ===
Name	Location	Foundation	Last significant interventions	Prevailing architectural style	Current status	Notes	Image
Santissima Addolorata al Colle	Via del Colle; 41.2180801°N 13.5573115°E	1841	1941	?	Not officiated	Owned first by the Buongiovanni family, then by the Di Fonzo family	
Sant'Agostino a Vivano	Piana di Sant'Agostino; 41.228627°N 13.506346°E	Before 1061	?	?	Vanished		
Sant'Ambrogio	Via Conca; 41°14′22″N 13°33′53″E	13th century	14th century	Gothic	Deconsecrated	Rectory suppressed in 1481	
Sant'Andrea	Formerly at Vico 26 Corso Attico 41.2260858°N 13.5662626°E	Before 1459	?	?	Vanished	Seat of the parish of the same name, suppressed in 1628 Patronage of the Gattola family	
Sant'Angelo dei Marzi	Via Sant'Angelo; 41.2573876°N 13.5576051°E	Before 1185	-	Gothic	Deconsecrated	Belonging to the Benedictine monks	
Sant'Antonio di Padova	Salita Cappuccini; 41.2212292°N 13.5670849°E	Around 1715	20th century	Baroque	Deconsecrated	Annexed to a convent of Capuchin friars suppressed in 1866	
Santi Apostoli	Viale Battaglione Alpini Piemonte; 41.2147987°N 13.5704888°E	Before 1711	?	Baroque	Vanished	Seat of the parish of the same name, suppressed in 1815	
Santi Carlo e Anna or San Carlo	Lungomare Giovanni Caboto; 41.2286929°N 13.5664684°E	1628	Second half of the 20th century	Baroque	Officiated	Seat of the parish of San Carlo Borromeo, formerly of the brotherhood of the Guardian Angel	
Cappella della Casa della Vita	Via del Colle; 41.2174114°N 13.5520999°E	Second half of the 1950s	-	Contemporary	Officiated	Inside the Casa della Vita	
Santi Cosma e Damiano also known as San Cosmo Vecchio	Via dell'Indipendenza; 41.2232067°N 13.5692666°E	Around 800	Mid-20th century	Gothic	Officiated	Home of the parish of the same name, transferred in 1944 to the church of Santa Maria di Porto Salvo, former home of the "Elena" Rosary Confraternity	
Santa Fortunata	Serapo	?	?	?	Vanished		
San Giacomo	Via San Giacomo-Collemare; 41.2587457°N 13.5453884°E	?	?	?	Vanished	Dependence of the monastery of San Martino of Itri	
San Giacomo Apostolo formerly San Giacomo di Terra Rossa	Via dell'Indipendenza; 41°13′N 13°34′E	Early 16th century	1957	Baroque; Contemporary	Officiated	Home of the parish and confraternity of San Francesco Former home of the confraternity of San Gregorio	
San Giacomo di Galizia	Via San Giacomo; 41.2297959°N 13.5667255°E	1357	?	?	Vanished	Annexed to a monastery of Carthusian monks until 1851	
San Lorenzo in Pontone	Along the river Pontone	Before 830	?	?	Vanished		
Santa Maria delle Grazie, San Francesco d'Assisi e San Silvestro or Madonna di Casalarga	Via Sant'Agostino; 41.2324302°N 13.5451599°E	Before the 17th century	1955	?	Occasionally officiated		
Madonna di Casaregola	Via Sant'Agostino; 41.2330614°N 13.5402751°E	Before 1180	?	?	Vanished	Rectory suppressed in 1481	
Santissima Immacolata e Anime Sante del Purgatorio or Madonna della Catena	Via Catena; 41.2100044°N 13.5488302°E	1635	20th century	Baroque	Not officiated	Owned by the Gattola family, hermitage and sanctuary; annexed to a convent of the Adorers of the Blood of Christ until the early 2000s	
Madonna della Civita	Via Conca; 41.239294°N 13.569119°E	1950s	?	?	Deconsecrated	Annexed to an institute of the Servants of Charity	
Madonna del Colle	Via del Colle; 41.2324302°N 13.5451599°E	Before the 17th century	1882	?	Occasionally officiated		
Santa Maria Bambina or Madonna di Conca	Via Conca; 41.2324302°N 13.5451599°E	1639	?	?	Occasionally officiated	Former dependency of the monastery of Santa Caterina	
Madonna delle Grazie ad Arcella	Lungomare Caboto; 41.2432084°N 13.5763222°E	?	?	?	Vanished		
Madonna di Longato	Via Sant'Agostino; 41.2324162°N 13.530104°E	1832	1882	-	Not officiated		
Madonna della Treglia	Lungomare Caboto; 41.2314861°N 13.5673444°E	Before 1829	?	?	Vanished	Former dependency of the monastery of San Giacomo di Galizia	
Madonnella di Serapo	Via Torino; 41.212671°N 13.5638303°E	?	?	?	Vanished		
Santi Maria, Agata e Onofrio or Sant'Agata	Colle Sant'Agata; 41°13′41″N 13°33′42″E	1327	-	Gothic	Deconsecrated, in a state of ruin	Annexed to a convent of the Third Order Regular of St. Francis, later of the Friars Minor, suppressed in 1809	
Santa Maria del Buon Cammino	Montesecco; 41.2124792°N 13.5709047°E	?	?	?	Vanished		
Santa Maria di Monte Ospedale or Madonna della Cappella	Via IV Novembre; 41.2150637°N 13.5676251°E	After 1100	?	?	Vanished	Belonging to the Sovereign Military Order of Malta	
Santa Maria della Pietà	Montesecco; 41.211940°N 13.571172°E	Around 1580	?	?	Vanished	Annexed to a convent of Capuchin friars suppressed in 1707	
Santa Maria Assunta al Pizzone	Lungomare Caboto; 41.2318816°N 13.5673613°E	17th century	?	?	Vanished	Owned by the Chinappi family	
Santa Maria di Porto Salvo also known as degli Scalzi	Salita degli Scalzi, 17; 41°13′N 13°34′E	1624	-	Baroque	Officiated	Annexed to a convent of Discalced Augustinians suppressed in 1806, formerly the seat of the confraternity of Santa Maria di Porto Salvo, since 1944 the seat of the parish of Santi Cosma e Damiano	
Santa Maria del Suffragio	Via Giuseppe Garibaldi, 27; 41°13′N 13°34′E	1850	-	Neoclassical	Not officiated	In the municipal cemetery	
Asceterio di San Nilo	Montesecco; 41.2138199°N 13.5681206°E	994	-	?	Vanished	Italian Basilian Monastery of Grottaferrata	
San Nilo Vecchio	Via San Nilo; 41.2129153°N 13.5616286°E	1938	-	-	Vanished		
San Nilo Abate	Via San Nilo, 12; 41.2129153°N 13.5616286°E	1965	-	Contemporary	Officiated	Home to the parish of the same name, a sanctuary since 2014	
Nostra Signora di Lourdes	Via Monte Altino; 41.2310215°N 13.5546104°E	1980s	-	Contemporary	Officiated	On the first floor of a residential building	
Nostra Signora della Misericordia	Via Atratina; 41.2179375°N 13.5661632°E	1926	-	Neoclassical	Officiated	Inside the convent of the nuns of St. Marie Madeleine Postel	
Beato Oliver Plunkett e Santi Martiri Irlandesi	Lungomare Caboto; 41.244722°N 13.5761868°E	1930s	-	Eclectic	Deconsecrated	Inside the former summer residence of the Pontifical Irish College	
Cappella dell'Ospedale Luigi Di Liegro	Salita Cappuccini; 41.221507°N 13.5667608°E	1980	-	Contemporary	Not officiated	Inside the Luigi Di Liegro Hospital	
San Paolo Apostolo	Piazza Trieste, 9; 41.2116756°N 13.5649001°E	1964	-	Contemporary	Officiated	Seat of the parish of the same name	
Santi Procolo, Stefano e Madonna della Civita or San Procolo	Via dell'Indipendenza; 41.2242661°N 13.5680538°E	?	?	Baroque	Vanished	Patronage of the Gattola family, since 1858 seat of the confraternity of Santo Stefano	
San Raffaele	Via Conca; 41.239521°N 13.5688072°E	1890s	-	Contemporary	Not officiated	Formerly owned by the Chinappi family, inside the former diocesan seminary	
San Sergio vecchio	Piazza della Libertà; 41.215066°N 13.5701706°E	Before 1375	?	?	Vanished		
San Sergio nuovo	Piazza della Libertà; 41.2152582°N 13.5711316°E	1638	?	?	Vanished	Seat of the parish of the same name, suppressed before 1711 Patronage of the Guastaferri family	
Santo Spirito del Borgo	Via dell'Indipendenza; 41.221003°N 13.569101°E	Before 1390	?	?	Deconsecrated	Belonged to the Hospitallers of the Holy Spirit until 1847, then to the Vendittis family (in whose palace it is located) Formerly the seat of the confraternity of the Madonna degli Angeli from around 1600, and officiated until the 1950s	
Spirito Santo, Beata Vergine Maria e San Giovanni Evangelista or Santo Spirito di Zennone	Piana di Arzano; 41.2365764°N 13.5596759°E	1295	-	Gothic	Deconsecrated, in a state of ruin	Annexed to the Cistercian abbey of the same name until about 1750	
Santo Stefano Protomartire	Via dei Frassini; 41.2174423°N 13.5538131°E	2009	-	Contemporary	Officiated	Seat of the parish of the same name	
Cappella di villa Mendoza	Via Gastone Maresca; 41.21686°N 13.560672°E	19th century	?	?	Vanished		
San Vitale	Via dell'Agricoltura; 41.241113°N 13.5494274°E	14th century	?	Gothic	Deconsecrated, in a state of ruin	Inside a grange of Cistercian monks	

== Non-Catholic places of worship ==
Name	Location
Seventh-day Adventist Church	Via dei Frassini; 41.2176428°N 13.5602942°E
"Emmanuele" Evangelical Christian Church	Via dell'Indipendenza; 41.222817°N 13.5671735°E
"L'Oasi" Pentecostal Evangelical Christian Church	Vico Orticello; 41.2236957°N 13.5693781°E
Kingdom Hall of Jehovah's Witnesses	Via San Giacomo; 41.2303881°N 13.5665441°E

== See also ==
- Gaeta
- Rural Marian chapels of Gaeta

== Bibliography ==
- Blois, Giovanni (1854). Narrazione storica religiosa politica militare del soggiorno nella real piazza di Gaeta del sommo pontefice Pio IX [Historical, religious, political and military account of the stay of the Supreme Pontiff Pius IX in the royal square of Gaeta] (in Italian). Napoli: Reale Tipografia Militare.
- Gaetani d'Aragona, Onorato (1885). Memorie storiche della città di Gaeta [Historical memories of the city of Gaeta] (in Italian) (2 ed.). Caserta: Stabilimento tipo-litografico della Minerva.
- Bertolotti, Giuseppe (1886). Statistica ecclesiastica d'Italia [Ecclesiastical Statistics of Italy] (in Italian). Savona: Tipografia A. Ricci.
- Ferraro, Salvatore (1903). Memorie religiose e civili della città di Gaeta [Religious and civil history of the city of Gaeta] (in Italian). Napoli: Tipografia Francesco Giannini & Figli.
- Salemme, Luigi (1939). Il borgo di Gaeta: contributo alla storia locale [The village of Gaeta: contribution to local history] (in Italian). Torino: ITER.
- Codex Diplomaticus Cajetanus (1958a). Codex Diplomaticus Cajetanus. Vol. II. Isola del Liri: Pisani.
- Codex Diplomaticus Cajetanus (1958b). Codex Diplomaticus Cajetanus. Vol. III. Montecassino: Arcicenobio di Montecassino.
- Codex Diplomaticus Cajetanus (1960). Codex Diplomaticus Cajetanus. Vol. IV. Montecassino: Arcicenobio di Montecassino.
- Leccese, Salvatore (1958). Il castello di Gaeta: notizie e ricordi [Gaeta Castle: news and memories] (in Italian). Isola del Liri: Tipografia M. Pisani.
- De Santis, Angelo (1967). "Chiese di Gaeta e del Borgo nel primo quarto del seicento" [Churches of Gaeta and Borgo in the first quarter of the 17th century]. Bollettino dell'Istituto di Storia e d'Arte del Lazio Meridionale (in Italian). 5. Roma: Casa di Nicola Crescenzo.
- Codex Diplomaticus Cajetanus (1969) [1887]. Codex Diplomaticus Cajetanus. Vol. I. Isola del Liri: Pisani.
- Allaria, Giuseppe (1970). Le chiese di Gaeta [The churches of Gaeta] (in Italian). Latina: Ente Provinciale per il Turismo, Camera di Commercio.
- Fiengo, Giuseppe (1971). Gaeta: monumenti e storia urbanistica [Gaeta: monuments and urban history] (in Italian). Napoli: Edizioni scientifiche italiane.
- Capobianco, Paolo (1973). Il seminario di Gaeta e il suo fondatore [The Gaeta seminar and its founder] (in Italian). Gaeta: La Poligrafica.
- Capobianco, Paolo (1979). Gaeta città di Maria: posuerunt me custodem [Gaeta, City of Mary: posuerunt me custodem] (in Italian). Gaeta: La Poligrafica.
- Corbo, Pasquale; Corbo, Maria Carolina (1985). Gaeta - La storia [Gaeta – The history] (in Italian). Vol. I. Gaeta: La Poligrafica.
- Capobianco, Paolo (1986). Gaeta e i "monaci" delle Crocelle [Gaeta and the "monks" of Crocelle] (in Italian). Gaeta: La Poligrafica.
- Capobianco, Paolo (1991). Studi e ricerche sul territorio di Gaeta [Studies and research in the Gaeta area] (in Italian). Gaeta: Il Golfo.
- Capobianco, Paolo (2000). I vescovi della Chiesa Gaetana [The bishops of the Gaetan Church] (in Italian). Vol. II. Fondi: Arti Grafiche Kolbe.
- Fronzuto, Graziano (2001). Monumenti d'arte sacra a Gaeta: storia ed arte dei maggiori edifici religiosi di Gaeta [Monuments of sacred art in Gaeta: history and art of the most important religious buildings in Gaeta] (in Italian). Gaeta: Edizioni del Comune di Gaeta.
- Avallone, Renato (2006). La chiesa di San Giovanni Battista della Porta a Gaeta. Una città tra le sue mura [The church of San Giovanni Battista della Porta in Gaeta. A city within its walls] (in Italian). Perugia: Futura.
- Tallini, Gennaro (2006). Gaeta: una città nella storia [Gaeta: a city through history] (in Italian). Gaeta: Edizioni del Comune di Gaeta.
- Boni, Salvatore (2008). Gaeta nello splendore della sua nobiltà e i suoi governatori [Gaeta in the splendor of its nobility and its governors] (in Italian). Roma: Istituto Poligrafico dello Stato.
- Macaro, Carlo (2008). La Diocesi di Gaeta nel '700 [The Diocese of Gaeta in the 18th century] (in Italian). Fondi: Tipolitografia C.O.R.E.
- Cesarale, Antonio; Magliozzi, Carlo; Di Ciaccio, Pasquale (2010a). Il catasto onciario di Gaeta [The Gaeta land registry] (in Italian). Vol. I. Gaeta: Le Nuove Scelte.
- Cesarale, Antonio; Magliozzi, Carlo; Di Ciaccio, Pasquale (2010b). Il catasto onciario di Gaeta [The Gaeta land registry] (in Italian). Vol. II. Gaeta: Le Nuove Scelte.
- Scalesse, Tommaso (2011). "Mappe di Gaeta nella Real Biblioteca e nel Kriegsarchiv" [Maps of Gaeta in the Royal Library and in the Kriegsarchiv]. Opus. Quaderno di Storia, Architettura, Restauro (in Italian). 11. Pescara: Carsa Edizioni.
- Tallini, Gennaro (2013). Vita quotidiana a Gaeta nell'età del viceregno spagnolo [Daily life in Gaeta during the Spanish viceroyalty] (in Italian). Gaeta: Centro Storico Culturale "Gaeta".
- Associazione Culturale Golfo Eventi (2018). Viaggio nel tempo nel quartiere La Piaja [A journey through time in the La Piaja neighborhood] (in Italian). Gaeta: Passerino.
