= Filippo Marsigli =

Italian painter (1790–1863)

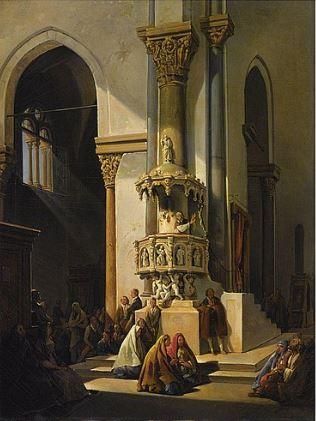
Church Interior

Filippo Marsigli (15 September 1790 – 8 May 1863) was an Italian painter in the Neoclassic style. He specialized in large canvases on epic, historical subjects.

== Biography ==
He was born in Portici. He began his studies at the Academy of Fine Arts in Naples, with Jean-Baptiste Wicar. When he came of age in 1808, he obtained a subsidy to attend the nude drawing school. In 1814, he won an award that enabled him to study in Rome. His first known work, Blind Homer Singing to the Shepherds, dates from 1818 and was created for Leopold, Prince of Salerno. He left Rome in 1821. The following year, he was a candidate for the chair of historical painting at the Academy, but the position went to the French-born artist, Joseph Franque.

After 1826, he was a regular participant in the biennial Bourbon Exhibition. This may have contributed to his being named an "Honorary Professor" at the Academy. In 1830 his large canvas The Tomb of the Good Man, won a major prize at the exhibition.

In the early 1830s, he began to produce decorative frescoes; notably, in 1836, a Resurrection of Christ for the church at the Camposanto Nuovo (New Cemetery). In 1841 he worked with Camillo Guerra, Gennaro Maldarelli, and Giuseppe Cammarano; decorating the ceilings in the rooms of the Royal Palace of Naples. He completed the Sala d’Amore, which is now the reading hall in the National library, with four oval scenes of Cupid and the Horae. In 1842 he and the same group of painters decorated the apse of the new Cathedral of Saint Michael the Archangel in Caserta.

In 1844, he was appointed Director of the Pensionato Artistico Nazionale in Rome. This required him to spend most of his time teaching, rather than painting. He would occupy that position until 1860. Following the death of Costanzo Angelini he became a member of the commission that would choose a new professor of drawing for the Naples Academy. During those years he also wrote and published some short essays on the art of drawing.

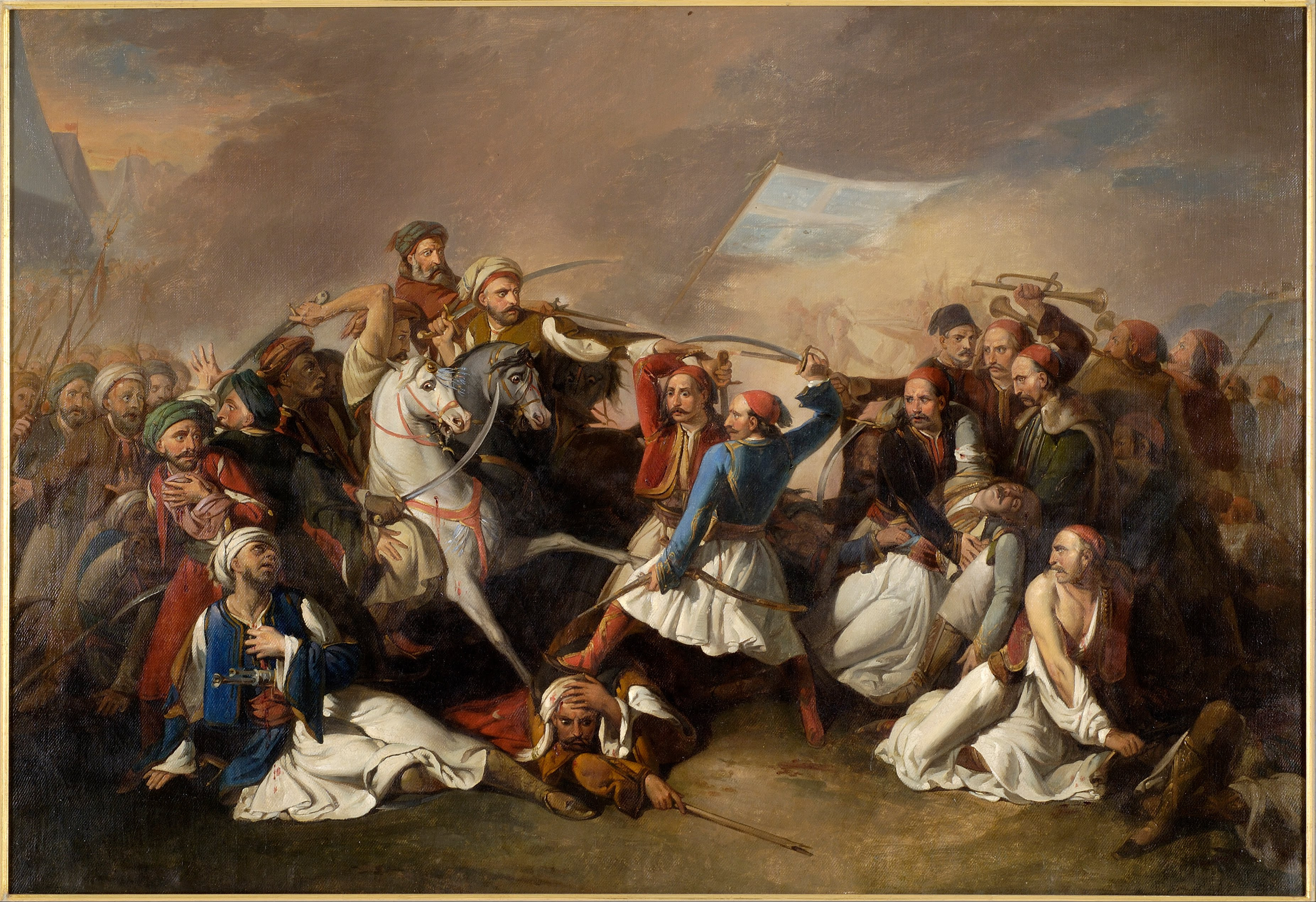
The Death of Markos Botsaris

Upon returning to Naples, he was named a Professor Emeritus at the Academy, a title which provided him with a modest annual pension. He died in 1863 in Naples.
