= Camillo Guerra =

Italian painter

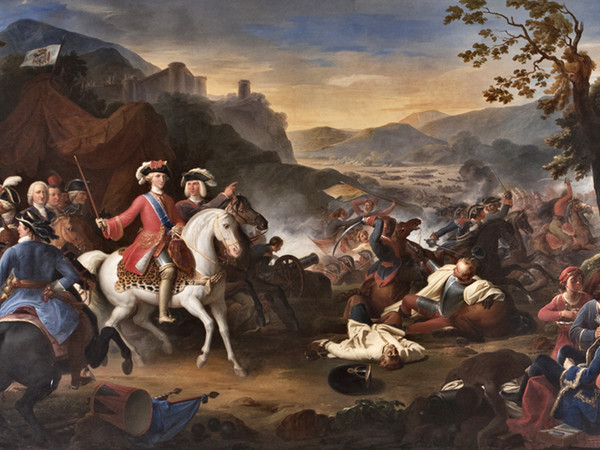
Charles III at the Battle of Velletri

Camillo Guerra (21 May 1797 – 10 March 1874) was an Italian painter of portraits and historical scenes.

== Biography ==
Guerra was born in Naples, Italy, to a family of artists. His father Pasquale, however, was the head of a crew performing excavations at Pompeii. At the age of twelve he began to study drawing at the Royal Academy of Fine Arts, under Costanzo Angelini. In 1822, he won a prize that led him to a scholarship in Rome under Tommaso Conca. He was also influenced by Vincenzo Camuccini and Pietro Benvenuti, who inspired him to paint historical and mythological subjects.

Early on, his career became linked to patronage from the Bourbon Royal Family. His first commission came in 1826, when he painted overdoors for the Royal Palace of Caserta. That same year, he was awarded a gold medal at the Bourbon Exhibition. The following year, he was named an honorary professor at the academy.

In 1829, he collaborated with the art historian Erasmo Pistolesi (1770–1860) on an eight-volume illustrated book about artifacts in the Vatican. In 1830, he created an altarpiece depicting the "Glory of St.Joseph" at the church of San Francesco di Paola, commissioned by King Francis I.

The chair of painting at the academy became vacant in 1834 and, after a competition, he was named Professor. In that position, he undertook significant changes in teaching practices, promoted the revival of fresco painting and adopted the practice of copying from life. He also superintended the restoration of works at the Bourbon Museum. In 1836, he married Nicolina Ametrano and they had eight children. His son Alfonso (1845–1920) became a well-known architect.

In the 1840s, with Gennaro Maldarelli, Filippo Marsigli, and Giuseppe Cammarano, he helped decorate rooms in the Royal Palace, now part of the Biblioteca Nazionale Vittorio Emanuele III. From 1846 to 1852, he painted an imposing fresco of the Celestial Paradise, based on a vision of St John the Evangelist, in the cupola of the Church of the Gerolomini (partly destroyed in 1943).
