= Costanzo Angelini =

Italian painter

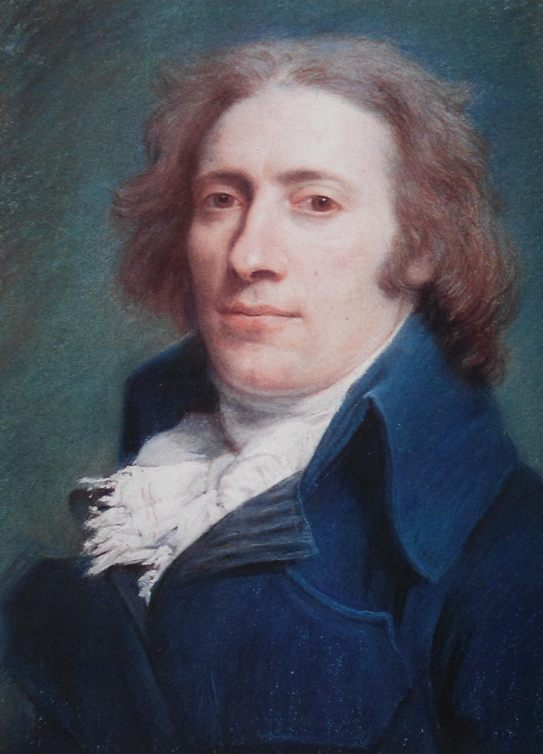
- Self-portrait, 1790s
- Born: 22 October 1760; Santa Giusta, Papal States
- Died: 22 June 1853 (aged 92); Naples, Kingdom of the Two Sicilies
- Known for: Painting
- Movement: Neoclassicism

Costanzo Angelini (22 October 1760, Santa Giusta, Rieti – 22 June 1853, Naples) was an Italian painter, engraver, and restorer of the Neoclassical style.

== Biography ==
=== Early life and education ===
Costanzo Angelini was born 22 October 1760, Santa Giusta, Rieti. He studied at the Accademia di San Luca in Romr under Domenico Corvi. While in Rome, he became of follower or Giovanni Volpato and Raffaello Morghen. He collaborated with them on Principi del disegno tratti delle più eccellenti statue antiche (Rome, 1786), a work that was of fundamental importance in disseminating the Neoclassical style, particularly through the teaching of the academies. When he moved to Naples in 1790, he became popular for his Neoclassic paintings, and is known for having engraved the Greek Vases of the Hamilton collection (1795).

=== Career ===
With the introduction of Neoclassicism in Naples, Angelini became the artist best able to respond to the demands of the new taste. He was soon patronized as a portrait painter by the aristocracy and court. In 1809 he painted a portrait of Joseph Bonaparte (Royal Palace of Caserta) and drew a pastel of the Battle of the Nile (Naples, Museo di Capodimonte), as well as designing a medal to commemorate the abolition of the feudal system (National Museum of San Martino, Naples). He enjoyed great prestige as a teacher of drawing in the Accademia di Belle Arti di Napoli, where he was responsible for training a large number of artists. His commitment to the doctrines of Neoclassicism is recorded in his writings on the teaching of art (1820–21). In 1813 he became superintendent and restorer for the Museo Borbonico. Later, he became a professor of design with the Real Accademia delle Belle Arti of Naples and, in 1841, he was named their secretary.

Angelini is most notable for his portraits, which are characterized by a naturalistic style and a strong sense of psychological analysis, as in his Self-portrait (Accademia di Belle Arti di Napoli) and such works as Mary Caroline of Bourbon (1790) and Domenico Venuti (both Naples, National Museum of San Martino). Filippo Balbi, Michele de Napoli and Giuseppe Marsigli were among his pupils. His son, Tito Angelini, became a sculptor who followed the Neoclassic-Romantic style of Antonio Canova. His daughter Teresa Angelini (born 1803) was also a painter.

== Writings ==
- Alcune idee di Costanzo Angelini per promuovere le arti liberali (Naples, 1820)
- Osservazioni sulle Accademie pittoriche per rendersi utili (Naples, 1821)
- Relazione storica ove si mostra il vantaggio che reca lo studiare la pittura in Roma (Naples, 1821)

== Bibliography ==
- Pepe, Mario (1961). "ANGELINI, Costanzo". Dizionario Biografico degli Italiani (in Italian). Vol. 3: Ammirato–Arcoleo. Rome: Istituto dell'Enciclopedia Italiana. OCLC 883370.
- Gherardo Rega, ed. (1900). Vasi dipinti del Museo Vivenzio disegnati da Costanzo Angelini nel 1798. Testo illustrativo di G. Patroni. Rome-Naples: Richter & Co.
