= Santissima Annunziata, Gaeta =

Church in Gaeta, Italy

Coordinates: 41°12′43.05″N 13°34′52.65″E

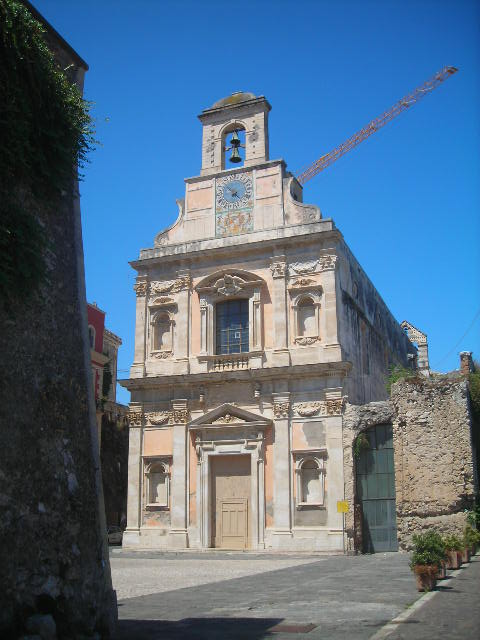
Façade of Sanctuary

The Sanctuary of the Santissima Annunziata is a Baroque Roman Catholic sanctuary in Gaeta, Lazio, Italy. It belongs to the parish that includes the Cathedral of Saints Erasmus and Marcian and St. Mary of the Assumption.

== History ==
The church and hospital were originally built in Gothic-style in the early 1354, when Gaeta was under Angevin rule. Numerous reconstructions took place and now the structure represents a Baroque style from the 1620s. The belltower-facade has a Maiolica clock made by Matteo De Vivo.

The entrance in the interior, the first altar contains small paintings (1520–1525) by Andrea Sabatini and Giovanni Filippo Criscuolo, depicting Sant'Apollonia (left) and Santa Lucia (right). The second altars on both sides of the nave have canvases by Luca Giordano: on the left, a Crucifixion with a Glory of St Dominic with Sts Peter Martyr & Francis of Paola; while on the right, an Adoration by Shepherds and a Sts Anne and Joachim.

The Chapel of the Holy Sacrament was designed by Jacopo Lazzari. The ceiling was painted by Andrea Scapuzzi. The altarpiece depicting the Madonna and Child is by Giacinto Brandi. Two paintings by Ribera were stolen during World War II. At the apse are the sculpted wooden choir stalls. Under windows are two paintings (1720) depicting the Presentation at the Temple and Adoration of the Magi by Sebastiano Conca. the main altar has a large polyptych (1521) by Sabatini depicting a number of scenes of the life of Jesus and the Virgin.

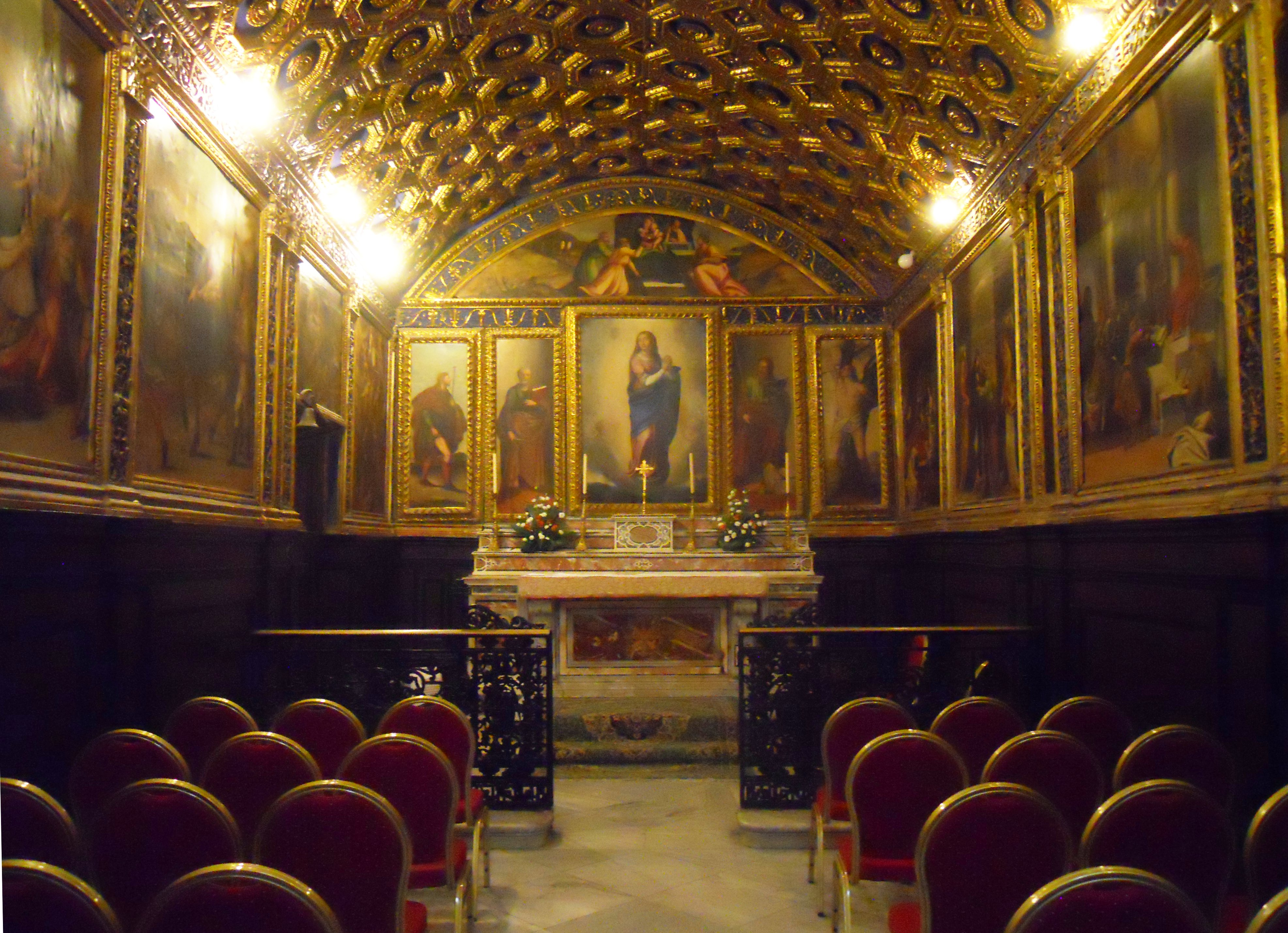
Cappella d'Oro towards main altar

The main chapel of the church, called the Cappella d'Oro or Grotta d'Oro dates from 1500s. It was decorated in the early 1520-1530s by Criscuolo, perhaps with contributions of Sabatini, with canvases depicting the Life of Christ and the Virgin. A painting of the Immaculate Conception (1582) was completed by Scipione Pulzone. The wooden coffered ceiling has gilded floral panels. The dedication of the chapel to the Immaculate Conception is not only due to the Pulzone altarpiece, but to the fact that Pope Pius IX, in exile at Gaeta during the revolt that formed the Roman Republic in 1848, prayed at this chapel for guidance and from here wrote the encyclical Ubi primum, requesting feedback on what became the dogmatic proclamation in 1854.

The adjacent hospital was founded in 1355, and rebuilt over the centuries, with a major reconstruction in 1619. It contains a pharmacy from the 17th century. The church conserves antique music codices.
