= Petrocelli (surname) =

Petrocelli is a surname. Notable people with the surname include:

- Achille Petrocelli (c. 1861–1896), Italian painter
- Antonio Petrocelli (born 1953), American actor, comedian and writer
- Arturo Petrocelli (1856–after 1916), Italian painter
- Daniel M. Petrocelli (born 1953), American defense attorney
- Paolo Petrocelli (born 1984), Italian cultural manager
- Rico Petrocelli (born 1943), American former Major League Baseball shortstop and third baseman
- Tracy Petrocelli (born 1951), American serial killer
- Vincenzo Petrocelli (1825–1896), Italian painter

== Television ==
- Petrocelli, 1970s American television series
- Petrucelli, surname
