= Tafuri =

Tafuri is a surname. Notable people with the surname include:

- Manfredo Tafuri (1935–1994), Italian architect, historian, theoretician, critic and academic
- Matteo Tafuri (1492–1582), Italian philosopher, astrologer and physician
- Raffaele Tafuri (1857–1929), Italian painter
