= Achille Carrillo =

Italian painter (1818–1880)

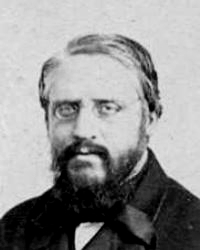
Achille Carrillo (date unknown)

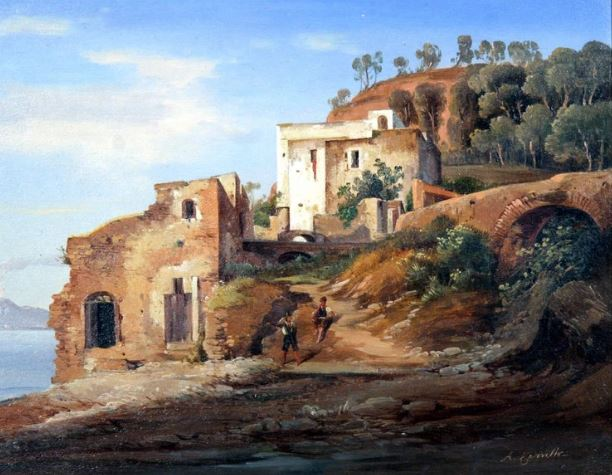
Coastal Scene Near Sorrento

Achille Carrillo (24 July 1818, Avellino - 20 August 1880, Naples) was an Italian painter; associated with the School of Posillipo.

== Life and work ==
He was born to Filippo Carrillo, a prosecutor at the Royal Civil Court, and his wife Rachele Grasso. After obtaining a law degree in 1842, he briefly worked as a lawyer. Later, he moved to Naples. There, he began to study art at the studios of Giacinto Gigante; becoming an accomplished watercolorist. This led him to enroll at the Royal Institute of Fine Arts, where he was a pupil of Gabriele Smargiassi.

For many years, he participated in the biennial exhibitions at the Royal Bourbon Museum. He also exhibited landscapes at the "Society for the Promotion of Fine Arts", a group of which he was one of the founding members. In 1870, he was awarded a gold medal at the Fine Arts Exposition in Parma, for his view of Naples from Posillipo.

In 1869, he was named to serve as a temporary replacement for Teodoro Duclère, the Professor of Landscape Painting at the Accademia. He was confirmed in that position in 1877. During his tenure there, his notable students included Vincenzo Caprile, Edoardo Monteforte, Vincenzo Montefusco, Achille Petrocelli, and Salvatore Petruolo.

His output was relatively small, but his works may be seen at the National Museum of San Martino and the Museo d'arte, Avellino.
