= Cesenatico Lighthouse =

Cesenatico lighthouse
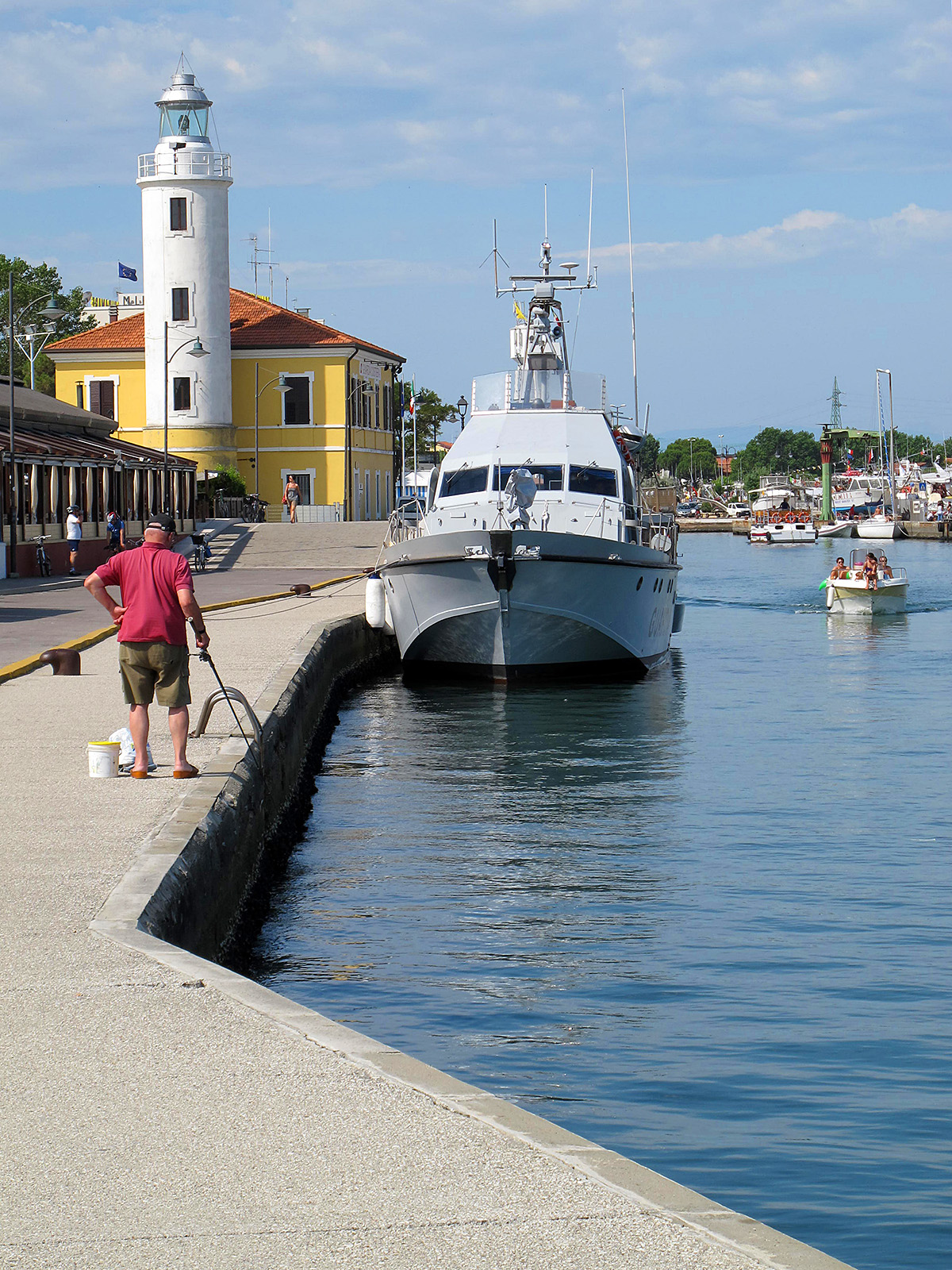
- Cesenatico Lighthouse
- Location: Cesenatico; Emilia-Romagna; Italy
- Coordinates: 44°12′22″N 12°24′06″E

Tower
- Constructed: 1892
- Construction: masonry tower
- Automated: yes
- Height: 17 metres (56 ft)
- Shape: cylindrical tower with balcony and lantern attached to a 2-storey keeper's house
- Markings: white tower, yellow keeper's house, grey metallic lantern dome
- Power source: mains electricity
- Operator: Marina Militare

Light
- Focal height: 18 metres (59 ft)
- Lens: Type OF; Focal length: 187.5 mm
- Intensity: main: AL 1000 W LABI 100 W
- Range: main: 15 nautical miles (28 km; 17 mi) reserve: 11 nautical miles (20 km; 13 mi)
- Characteristic: Fl (2) W 6s.
- Italy no.: 4028 E.F.

Latarnia Cesenatico (Italian: Faro di Cesenatico) to aktywna Latarnia morska usytuławana na south-west od wejście do kanału harbour w Cesenatico, Emilia-Romagna nad Adriatic Sea.

== Description ==
The lighthouse, built in 1892, consists of a 2-storey yellow and white trim keeper's house; the tower, 10 feet (3.0 m) high with balcony and lantern, is attached to the seaward side. The lantern, painted in white and the dome in grey metallic, is positioned at 18 metres (59 ft) above sea level and emits two white flashes in a 6 seconds period, visible up to a distance of 15 nautical miles (28 km; 17 mi). The lighthouse is completely automated and operated by the Marina Militare with the identification code number 4028 E.F.

== See also ==
- List of lighthouses in Italy
- Cesenatico
