= Hans Sandreuter =

Swiss artist and designer

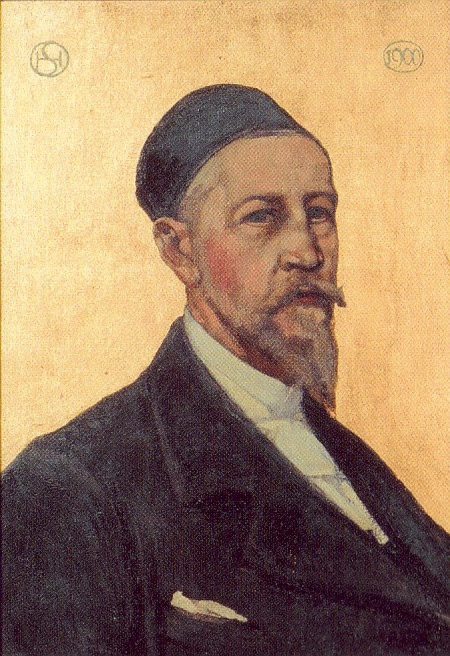
Self-portrait (1900)

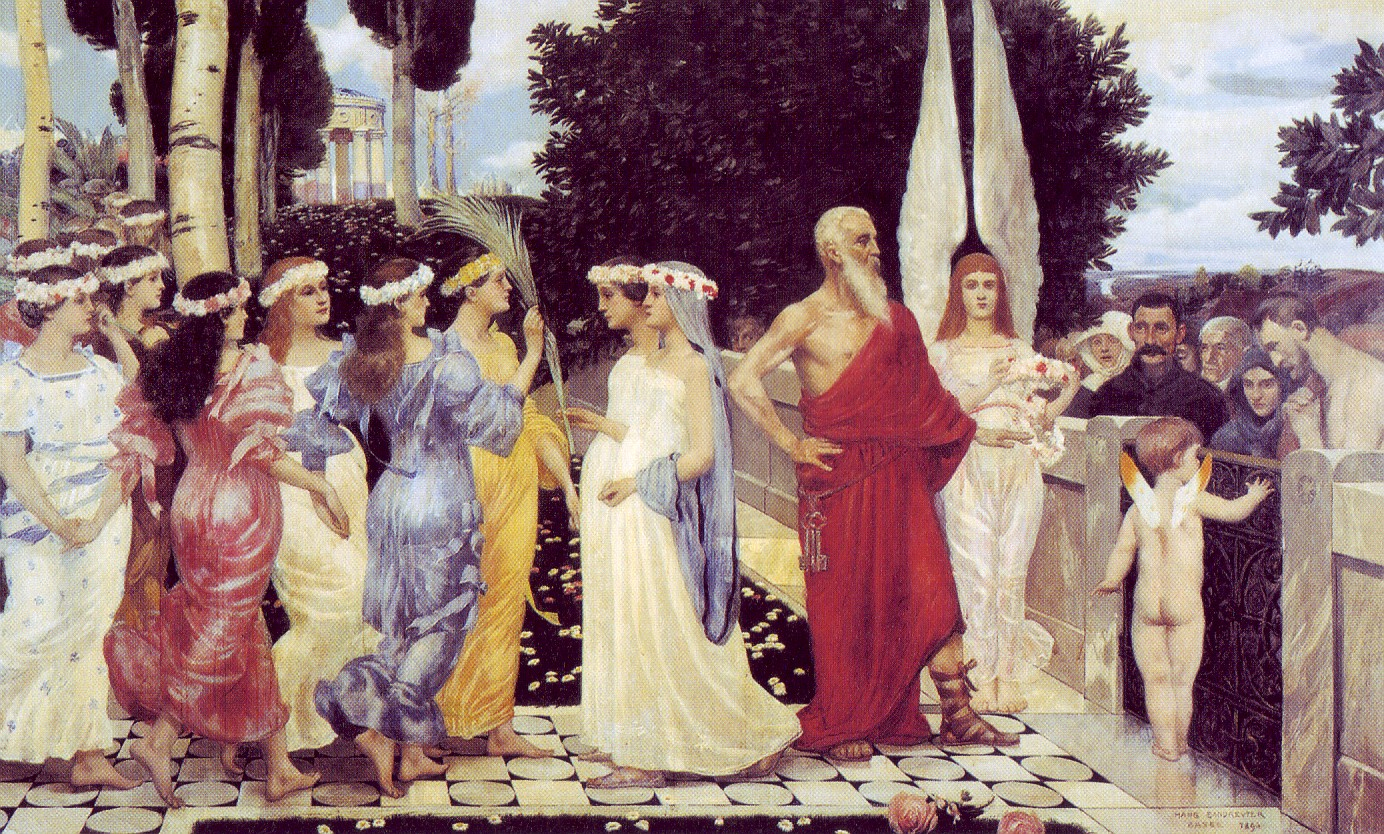
At Heaven's Gate (1894)

Hans Sandreuter (11 May 1850, Basel - 1 June 1901, Riehen) was a Swiss artist and designer who painted in the Symbolist style.

== Biography ==
After completing his secondary education, he began an apprenticeship as a lithographer. He then worked for a short time in Nuremberg before heading to Verona for further studies with Achille Carrillo; returning to Basel in 1872. The following year, he went to Munich and made the acquaintance of Arnold Böcklin at a private art school. Through his intercession with Wilhelm von Kaulbach, Sandreuter was able to attend the nude drawing classes at the Academy of Fine Arts.

He went with Böcklin to Florence in 1874 and, due to an illness, stayed with him until 1877, then went to Paris. After two years there, he returned to Florence then, after another two years, opened a studio in Basel. He received numerous contracts for murals in public buildings; notably the monastery in Stein am Rhein. In 1896. he was named a member of the Federal Arts Commission. The following year, he returned briefly to Florence, where he worked on preparing the Böcklin Exhibition for the Kunsthalle Basel.

In 1899, he was diagnosed with diabetes. He died at home two years later. Initial post-mortem criticism was unkind, with many calling him a mere imitator of Böcklin.

A major retrospective was held at the Kunstmuseum Basel on the 100th anniversary of his death. It included stained glass and furniture designs as well as paintings. Some of his decorative work may still be seen; notably the façade at the Bear Guild and the walls at the Blacksmith's Guild.
