= Petruolo =

Petruolo is a surname. Notable people with the surname include:

- Maria Palma Petruolo (born 1989), Italian actress
- Salvatore Petruolo (1857–1946), Italian painter
