= Edoardo Monteforte =

Italian painter (1849–1933)

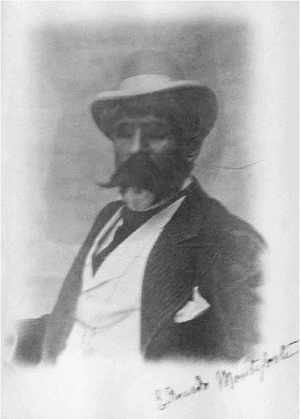
Edoardo Monteforte

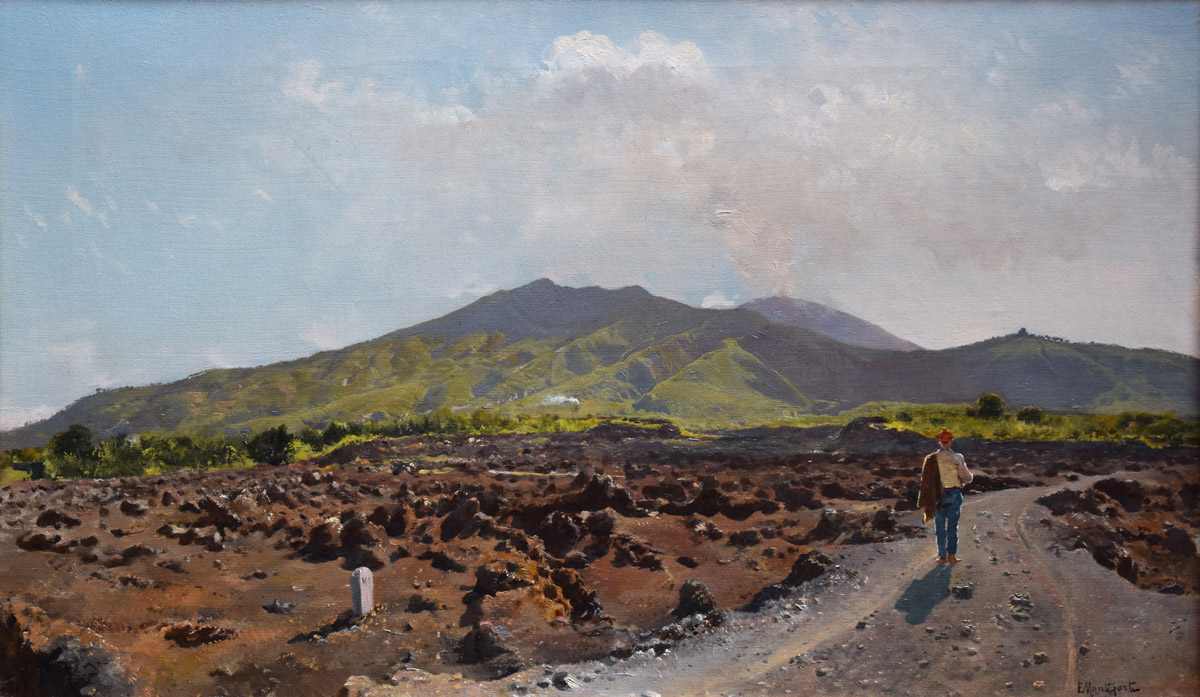
The Way to Mount Vesuvius

Edoardo Monteforte (6 March 1849, Polla – 1932/333, Naples) was an Italian landscape painter.

== Life and work ==
He enrolled at the Academy of Fine Arts of Naples in 1862, where he studied with Achille Carrillo and Gabriele Smargiassi. From the beginning, he focused on landscapes and seascapes, in oil and watercolors, with luminous lighting effects.

In 1870, he began to exhibit regularly at the "Society for the Promotion of the Fine Arts". In 1877 at Naples, he exhibited: Sunday in October Near Pompeii and two watercolors titled: On the Beach and Winter. In 1881 at Milan, he exhibited Spinelli Park], Return from Fishing, and Return from Sorrento. At the 1883 Exhibition in Milan, he displayed Fresh Wind, The Sorrento Marina, and The Sorrento Coast. In 1884 at Turin, he exhibited Return from Fishing; Mount Scutari, and Morning in the Woods. Much of his work was purchased by collectors from France and England.

He also sent works to exhibitions in Melbourne (1880), and Berlin (1883). After a trip to Egypt, he painted a number of Orientalist subjects, including The Evening on the Upper Nile, and Tomb of the Caliph in Cairo, exhibited in 1898 at Turin.
