= Temple of St. Francis =

Church in Gaeta, Italy

- Tempio di San Francesco
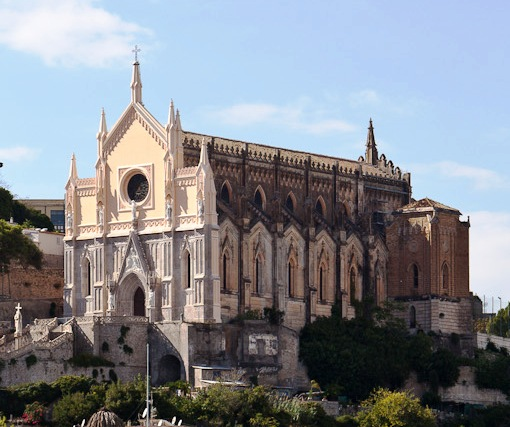
- Exterior view

- Location within Italy
- 41°12.65033′N 13°34.85633′E
- Location: Gaeta, Lazio
- Country: Italy
- Denomination: Catholic
- Religious institute: Order of Friars Minor (1285–1809); Salesians of Don Bosco (1927–1992)

History
- Founder: Charles II of Naples
- Dedication: Francis of Assisi
- Consecrated: October 9, 1927

Architecture
- Architect: Giacomo Guarinelli (nineteenth-century restoration)
- Style: Gothic Revival architecture
- Groundbreaking: 1283
- Completed: 1870

Administration
- Archdiocese: Roman Catholic Archdiocese of Gaeta

The Temple of St. Francis (Italian: Tempio di San Francesco) is a Catholic place of worship in Gaeta, located in the historic center of the city. It belongs to the parish that includes the Cathedral of Saints Erasmus and Marcian and St. Mary of the Assumption. The frescoes in the temple were painted by Vincenzo Petrocelli and Domenico Morelli.

The church was built beginning in 1283, through donations from Charles II of Anjou, as a place of worship attached to a convent founded by Francis of Assisi in 1222; in the second half of the 1850s it was radically restored in neo-Gothic style to a design by Giacomo Guarinelli, through the involvement of Pope Pius IX and funding from Ferdinand II of the Two Sicilies.

The building is located on the slope of Mount Orlando facing the Gulf of Gaeta, in a dominant position over the city's historic center; it is sometimes mistakenly referred to as the city cathedral because of its scenic location and elaborate architecture.

== History ==
In 1222, Francis of Assisi, traveling in southern Italy, preached in the town of Gaeta, where he stayed a few days at the invitation of the townspeople and performed a number of miracles. There he founded a small convent with an adjoining chapel, located outside the then city walls (the circuit of which had been enlarged the same year at the behest of Frederick II up to the present Piazza Conca); during the construction of which a carpenter, crushed by a beam, was killed. The saint, informed of the incident, drew a sign of the cross on the dead man, and he, called by name, resurrected. According to another source, the resurrected dead man was a bricklayer crushed by a boulder. The complex, once completed, consisted of the small church, devoid of any particular decoration, and the few cells of the friars, including the one in which the founder had slept; the church was dedicated to the Virgin of the Assumption in 1255; the entire structure underwent initial restoration in 1275 at the behest of Charles I of Anjou.

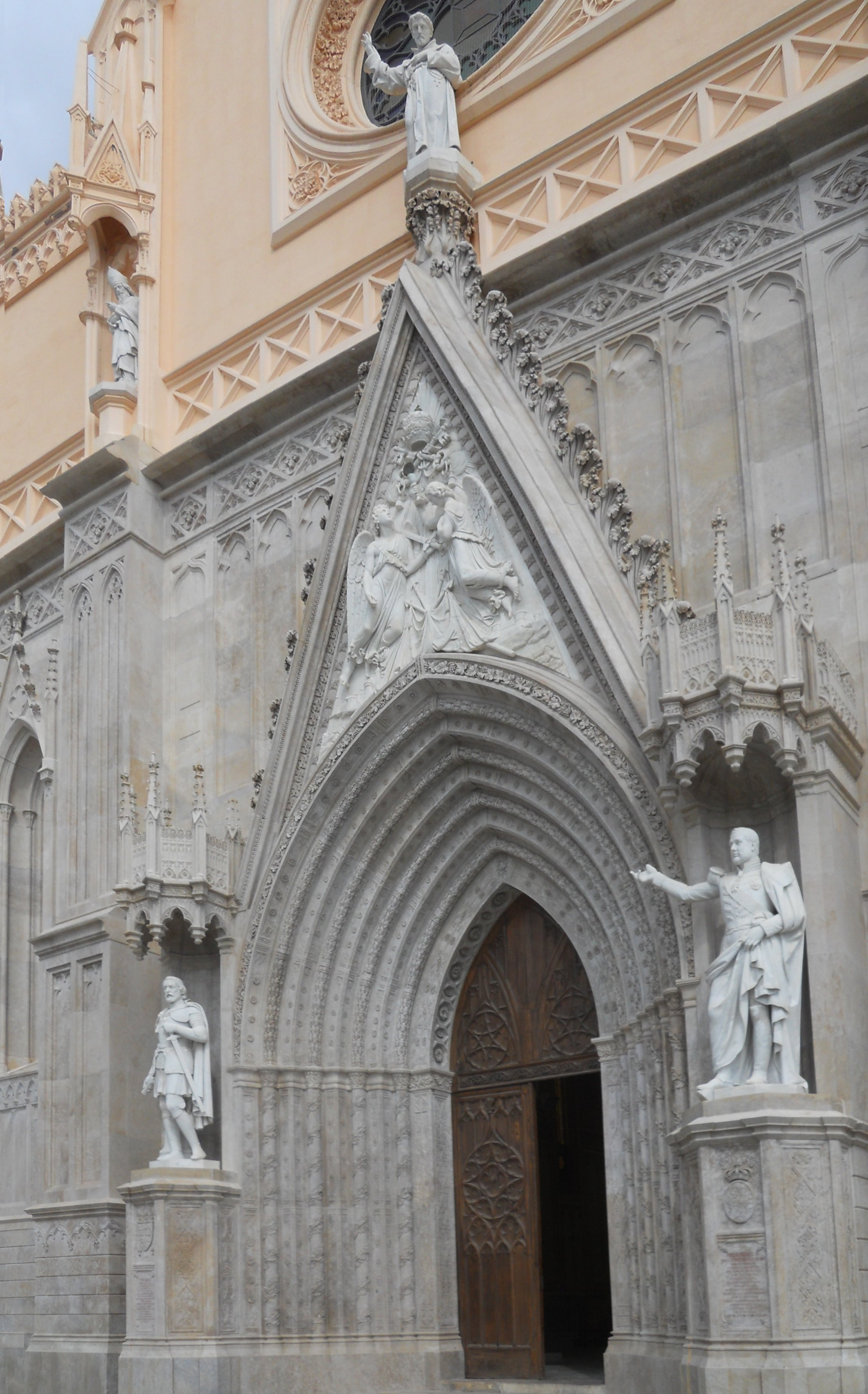
The neo-Gothic portal, adorned with statues of St. Francis of Assisi (on top of the wimperg), Charles II of Anjou (on the left, who began the construction of the church in 1285) and Ferdinand II of Bourbon (on the right, who restored the church in the 1850s).

With the growing number of vocations and because of the remarkable devotion shown by the people of Gaeta, at the same time as the expansion of the convent, the construction of a new and larger church began in 1285, dedicated to Francis of Assisi, who had been canonized in 1228 by Pope Gregory IX; the building was financed by Charles II of Anjou and his son Louis, a Franciscan and Bishop of Toulouse, who visited the site in 1295.

The church was finished in the early 14th century: Gothic in style, it was large in size, with a vast single nave of five bays covered with extradossed cross vaults, along which eight side chapels were asymmetrically arranged, ending with a quadrangular apse flanked, on the right, by an additional chapel and the bell tower crowned with a small dome; its external appearance is clearly visible in Frans Vervloet's painting View of Gaeta on the occasion of the blessing given by Pius IX on December 8, 1848 (1850). Over the centuries, it was enriched by Gaeta's most important noble families, who had their own aristocratic chapel inside it (among them the Gattola family, who had six burials there, the Guastaferri family, and the Gaetani family). Among the numerous funerary monuments was that of Cardinal Bartolomeo Uliari, from Padua, papal legate in Gaeta to Ladislaus I of Naples from 1393 to 1396, with a sarcophagus supported by two marble lions, later used as the base of the fountain in the center of the cloister of the convent. The church was home until 1806 to the Royal Mount of Piety of San Giacomo degli Spagnoli, the existence of which is attested from 1697 and which had two chaplaincies in San Francesco. In 1742 the convent numbered 35 friars, of whom 20 were professed and 15 were lay brothers.

In 1809, with the suppression of religious orders ordered by Joachim Murat, king of Naples, the convent of St. Francis in Gaeta was also seized and used as a military hospital, and the complex fell into neglect, which continued after the restoration. The church, in particular, which had already been damaged by an earthquake in 1764 that caused the bell tower to collapse, was in a state of decay; this was noticed even by Pope Pius IX, in voluntary exile in Gaeta from November 1848 to September of the following year, who called for a restoration of the ancient structure. In this he urged Ferdinand II of the Two Sicilies, who implemented and financed the rebuilding of the church.

The project was entrusted to Giacomo Guarinelli, a major and commander of the Engineer Corps, as well as an architect. He did not demolish the old church, but preserved its Gothic structure by enlarging and cladding it, both internally and externally, with a rich neo-Gothic decorative scheme, and by making some changes to the spaces from their original state (e.g. by transforming the chapels into aisles). Work lasted from April 1850 to 1858; it was interrupted at the time of the siege of the city (1860), only to be finished under the direction of Francesco Del Vecchio (who took over from Guarinelli in 1870 and remained faithful to his predecessor's project) in 1874 at the expense of the Italian government, which had already financed a restoration in 1864 after the minor damage caused during the siege. However, the structure remained unfinished in the bell tower: it was intended to be built on the right side of the church, to be divided into four orders (construction stopped at the first) and to end with a tall spire, the top of which would have been placed about 62 meters from the base. The dedication, scheduled for October 4, 1885, did not take place until October 9, 1927.

The church was restored again in 1927 (on that occasion the upper part of the facade was deprived of the dense relief decoration formed by a series of quatrefoils) and entrusted to the Salesians of Don Bosco; in 1929 the Salesians founded, in the former convent, the "Don Bosco Oratory" and remained there until 1992. During World War II, on Sept. 8, 1943, a bomb hit the right choir loft of the church (but did not damage the rest of the building), and in the years 1951–1952 restoration work was necessary, which was followed by the reopening of the temple.

In the last years of the 20th century, the structure was subjected to several collapses, due to water infiltration and insufficient maintenance; therefore, it was closed in 1998 after part of the cross placed on the top of the facade fell off. Restoration work began in 2004 (the construction site was inaugurated on February 3 of that year in the presence of the then Archbishop of Gaeta Pier Luigi Mazzoni) and the church was reopened on October 4, 2008 with a Eucharistic celebration presided over by Archbishop Fabio Bernardo D'Onorio.

In October-November 2018, scenes from Michela Andreozzi's film Brave ragazze (2019) were filmed in the church and former convent.

== Description ==
=== Measurements and dimensions ===
Parameter	Measure
Total length	72.5 meters
Length of the nave	68 meters
Width of the nave	14.3 meters
Width of each side aisle	5.8 meters
Height of the facade	34.5 meters
Height (planned) of the completed bell tower	62 meters
Height of the vault of the nave	26.5 meters
Height of the vault of the side aisles	13.2 meters
Diameter of the rose window of the facade	5.8 meters

=== Exterior ===
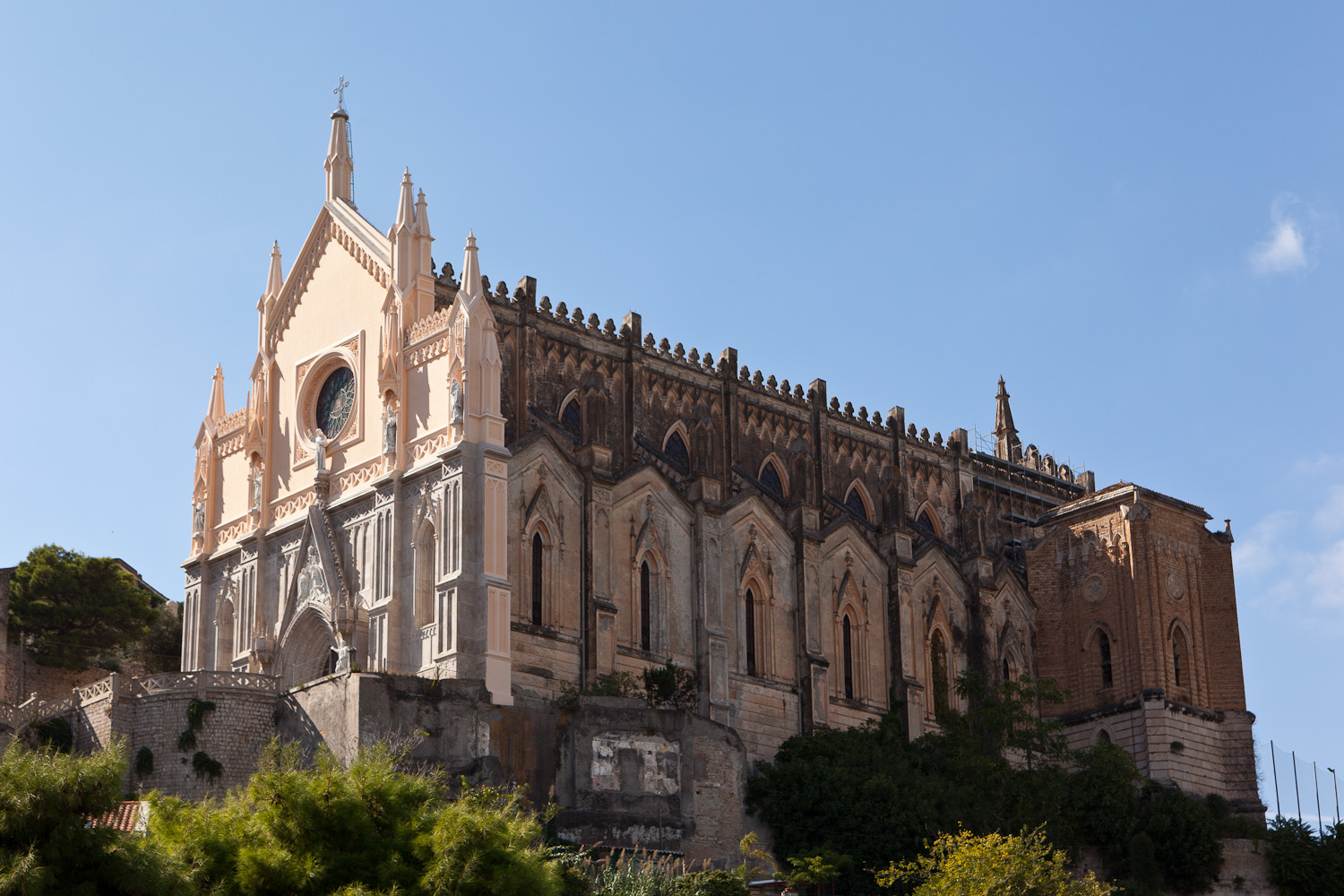
Exterior view of the church: note the elaborate neo-Gothic decoration and the bell tower, which remained unfinished on the first order.

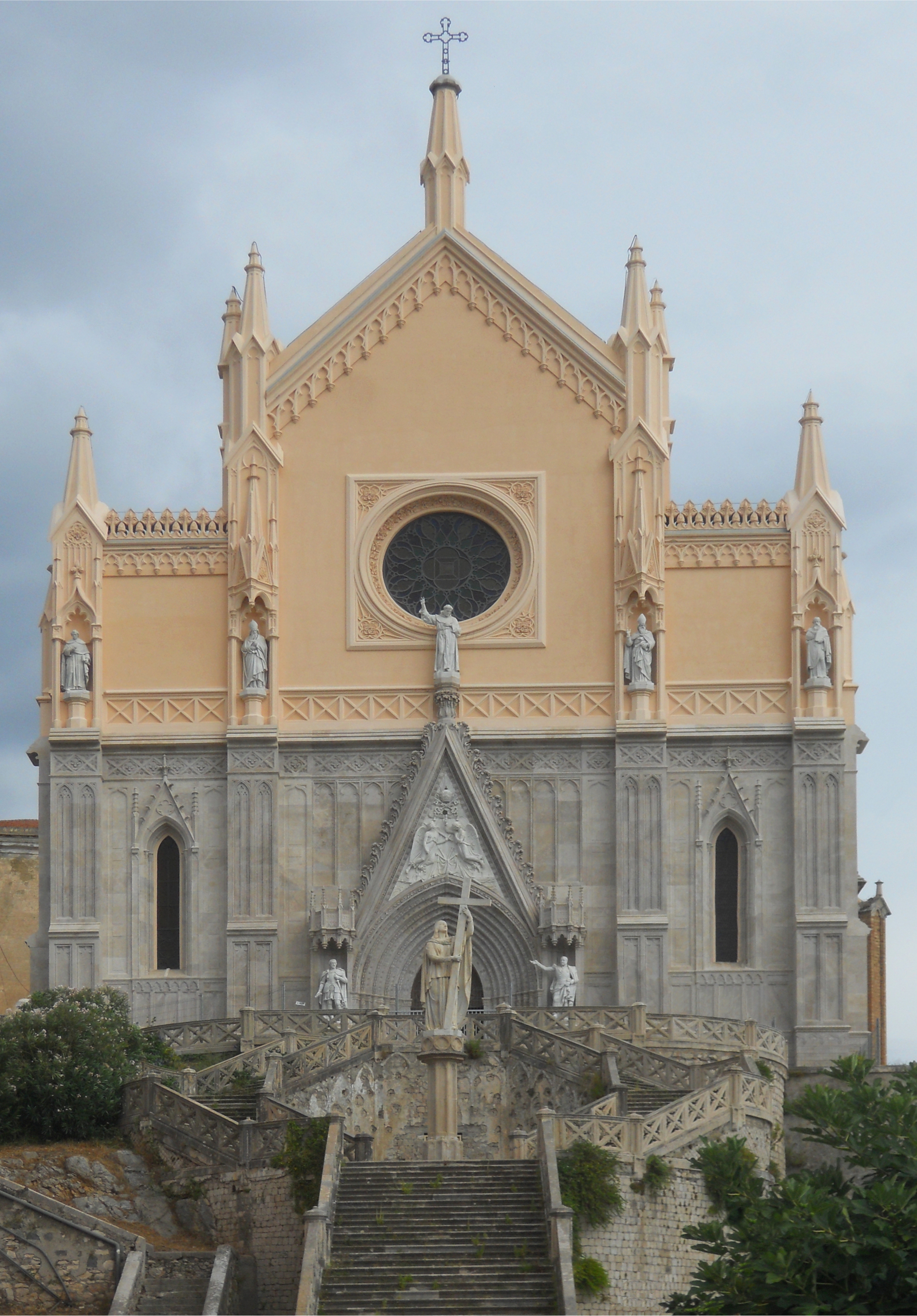
The facade, preceded by the staircase with the statue of Religion by Luigi Persico (1853).

The exterior, much like the interior, is characterized by the rich nineteenth-century plastic decoration in neo-Gothic style, designed by Giacomo Guarinelli, which covers the ancient Gothic structure of the 13th-14th centuries.

The south façade is preceded by a monumental staircase that leads to the cemetery. In the central part, it is divided into two symmetrical flights, each of which follows a semicircular trajectory, forming a clearing in the center where, on a high pedestal, there is a statue of Religion by Luigi Persico (1853), depicted as a standing woman holding a large cross.

The elevation is prominent and traces the internal structure of three naves with as many sections separated by rectangular buttresses, each of which ends with a dome with an octagonal base. The lower part of the façade (corresponding to the internal distance between the floor and the key of the vaults of the aisles) is in travertine with decoration in pointed blind arches; the upper part, on the other hand, has a smooth wall surface in light-colored plaster, dating from the 1927 restoration (in fact, it was previously made up of a dense network of relief quatrefoils in stucco). Just above the cornice separating the two orders, close to each buttress, in a niche (and the two central ones are also covered by a high canopy), are four marble statues by different authors; from the left, they represent St. Bernard (by Tomaso d'Arnaud), St. Ambrose (by Tito Angelini), St. Augustine and St. Thomas Aquinas (both by Tommaso Solari).

In the lower part, while each of the two lateral naves has a slender ogival single lancet window with wimperg, the central nave has a portal, also in travertine, with a deep spandrel richly decorated in bas-relief with floral motifs. It is surmounted by a high wimperg decorated with a high relief by Salvatore Irdi depicting the allegory of the Restoration of the Papacy and surmounted by a statue by Gennaro Calì depicting St. Francis of Assisi. On either side of the door, under a canopy, are marble statues of Charles II of Anjou (left) and Ferdinand II of the Two Sicilies, both by Gennaro De Crescenzo. Each of them rests on a high polygonal base with an inscription in Latin recalling the ruler's commitment to the Gaetan Church:

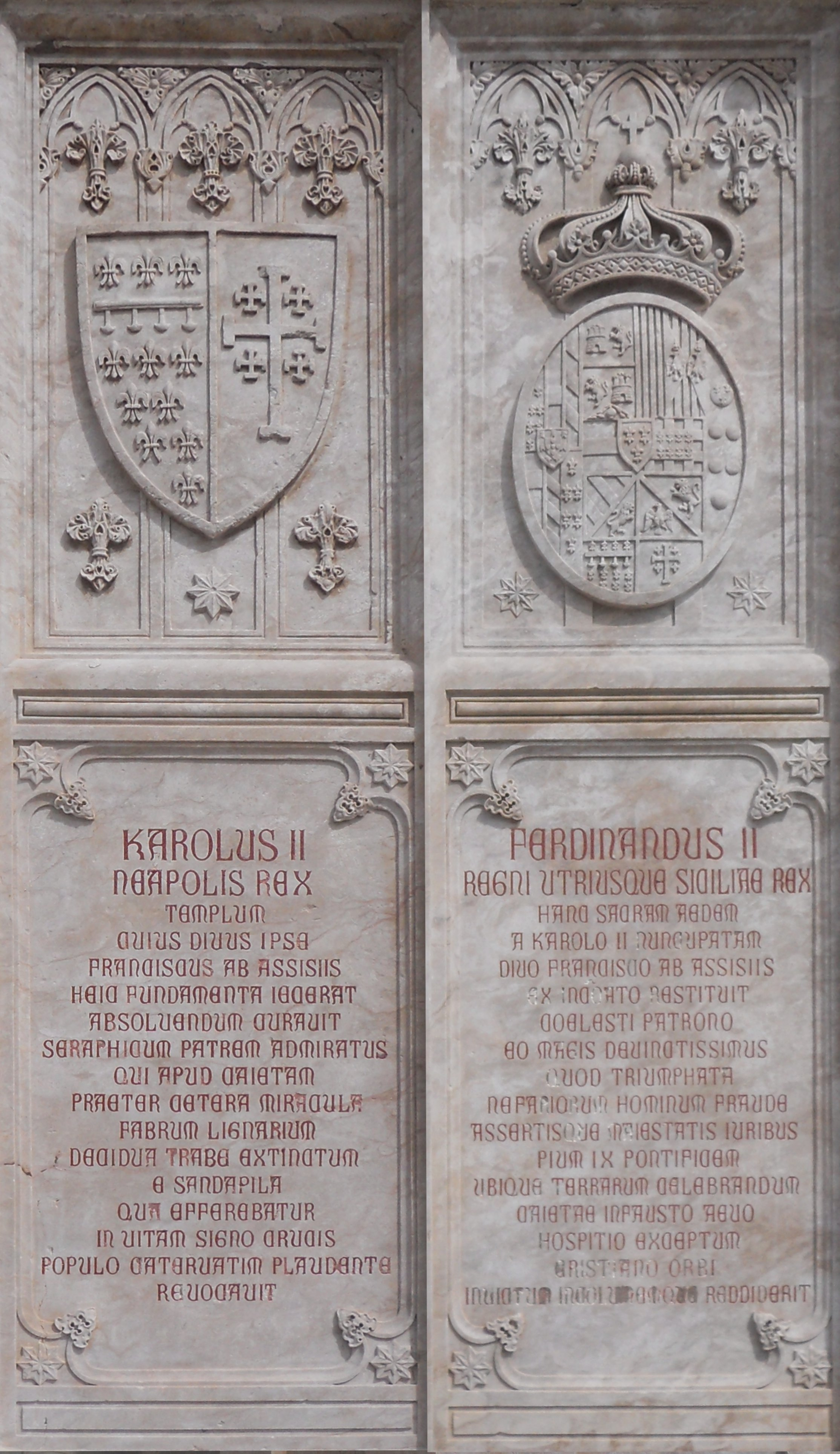
The inscriptions under the statues of Charles II of Anjou (left) and Ferdinand II of the Two Sicilies (right).

Karolus II

Neapolis rex
templum
cuius divus ipsa
Franciscus ab Assisiis
heic fundamenta iederat
absolvendum duravit
Seraphicum Patrem admiratus
qui apud Caietam
praeter cetera miracula
fabrum lignarium
decidua trabe extinctum
e sandapila
qua efferebatur
in vitam signo crucis
populum catervatim plaudente

revocavit.
Charles II, King of Naples, consolidated and completed the temple of which St. Francis of Assisi had laid the foundations, admiring the fact that, among other miracles, the Seraphic Father, in Gaeta, had resurrected, with the sign of the cross, from the coffin in which he was being carried to the funeral, a carpenter killed by a fallen beam, amidst the applause of the masses.

—Inscription under the statue of Charles II of Anjou.

Ferdinandus II

Regni Utriusque Siciliae rex
hanc sacram aedem
a Karolo II nuncupatam
divo Francisco ab Assisiis
ex incoato restituit
coelesti patrono
eo magis devinctissimus
quod triumphata
nefariorum hominum fraude
assertisque maiestatis iuribus
Pium IX pontificem
ubique terrarum celebrandum
Caietae infausto aevo
hospitio exceptum
cristiano orbi

invictum incolumemque reddiderit.
Ferdinand II, King of the Kingdom of the Two Sicilies, rebuilt from the foundations this sacred temple, dedicated by Charles II to St. Francis of Assisi, the celestial patron saint, who was all the more devoted to him because, after overcoming the snares of the wicked and defending the rights of majesty, he restored to the Christian world the undefeated and unharmed pontiff Pius IX, who at the inauspicious moment was sheltered in the refuge of Gaeta.

—Inscription under the statue of Ferdinand II of the Two Sicilies.

In axis with the portal, behind the statue of St. Francis, is a circular rose window about 5.8 meters in diameter, closed by a polychrome stained glass window with aniconic subject. At the top of the facade, above a pinnacle with an octagonal base, is an iron cross.

Along the right side of the church, overhanging the Angevin street below, stands, at the end of the side aisle, the squat bell tower with a square base and a brick wall face; this houses three bells, each inside an ogival single lancet window, surmounted by a blind marble rose window. The present construction is the first of the four orders that were to make up the tower designed by Giacomo Guarinelli, which was to end with a tall spire.

=== Interior ===
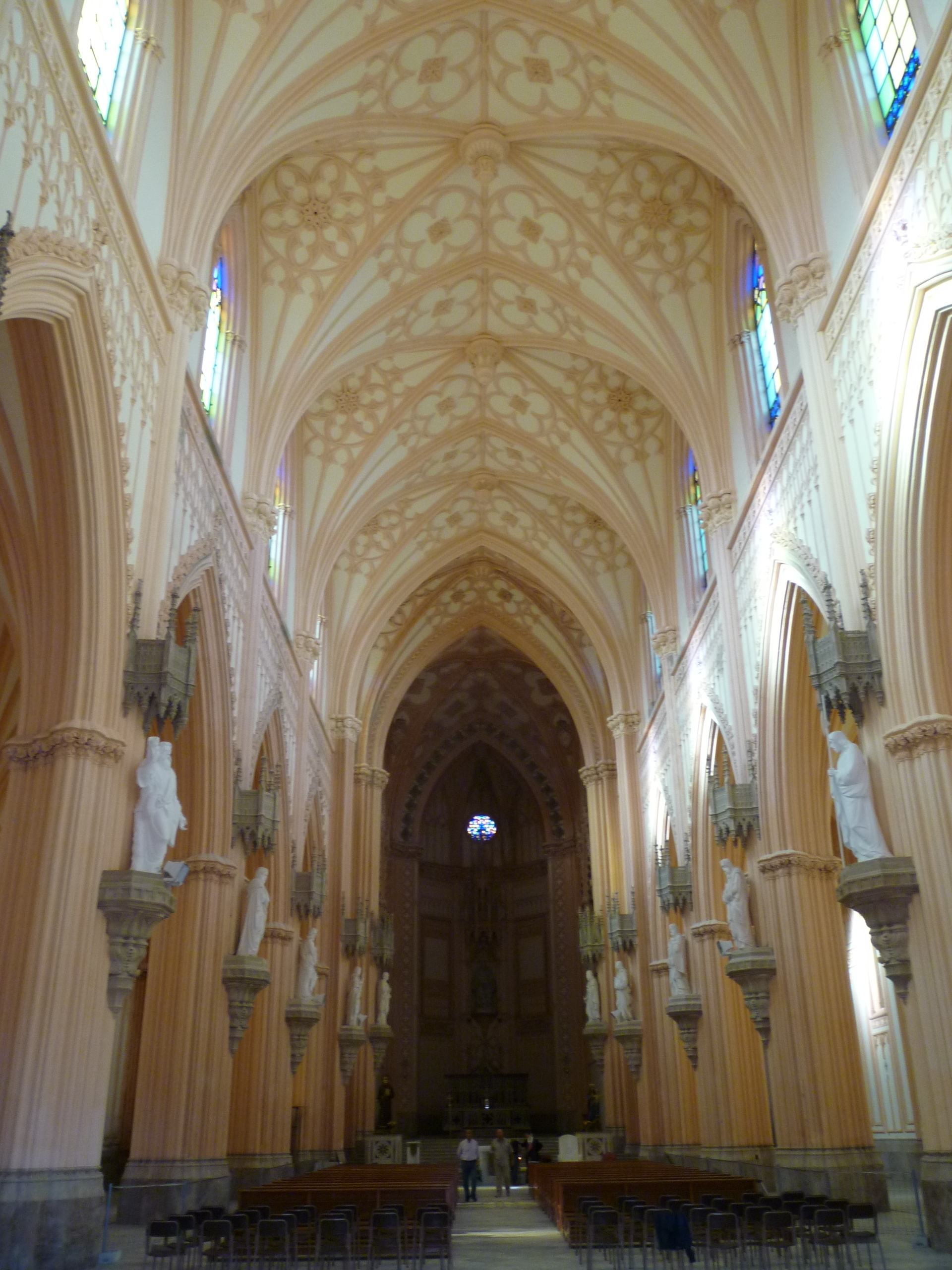
The interior of the temple with some people: note the large size of the hall.

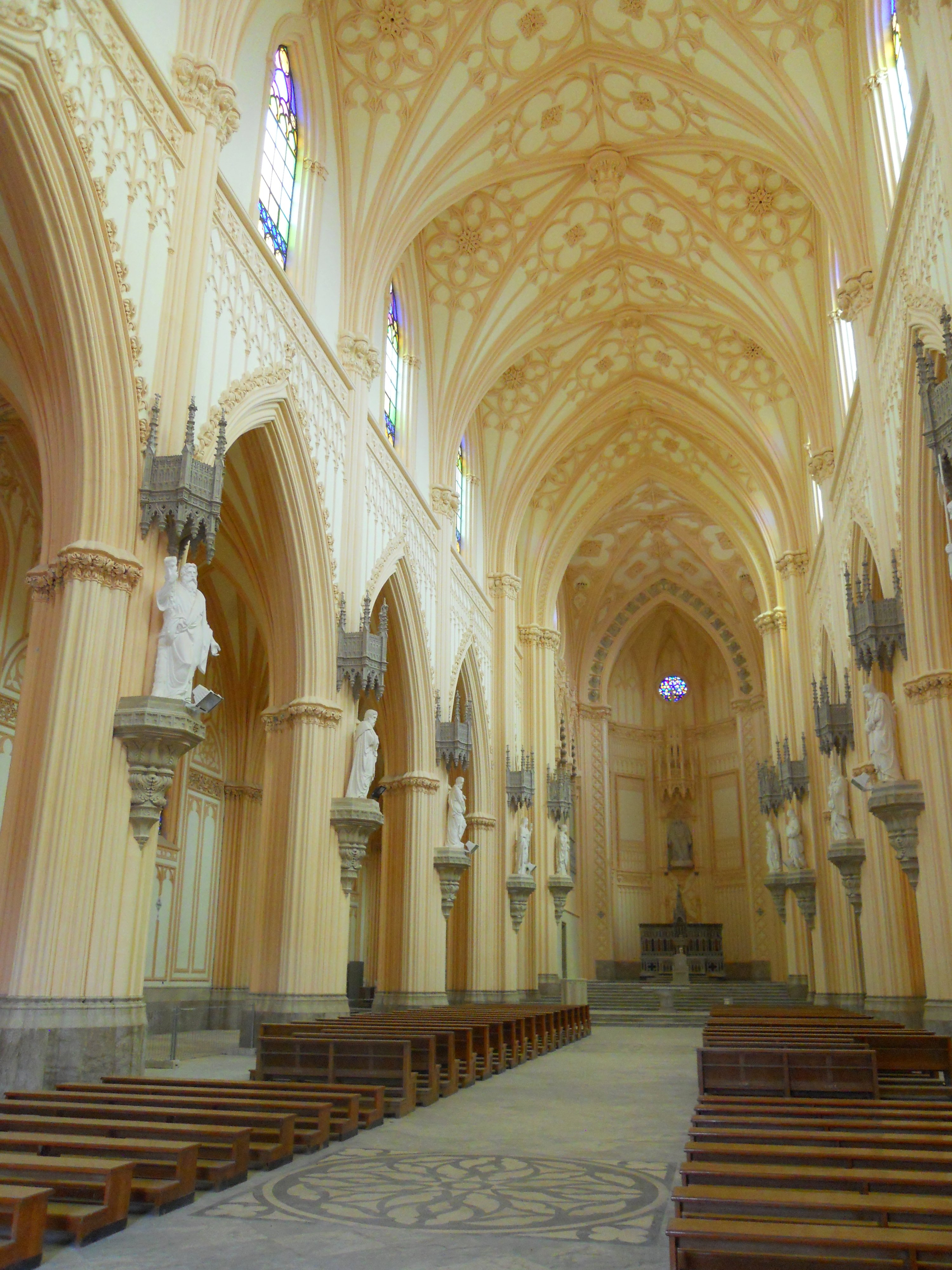
Interior toward the apse.

Inside, the temple of St. Francis presents a three-nave structure without a transept; they are covered with cross vaults and separated from each other by two rows of six pointed arches, resting on polystyle pillars. The walls, like the ceiling, are decorated with a dense stucco plastic apparatus of neo-Gothic style, dating from the 19th-century restoration (all that remains of the Gothic church is the structure, which is not visible).

The room is presented as remarkably bright due to the light color of the wall face (cream-colored, with light amber decorative and structural elements) and the numerous windows: these are closed with polychrome geometric stained-glass windows and are, with the exception of the four rose windows, all single-light ogival windows, the ones forming the clerestory of the nave being wide and not very slender, while those of the smaller naves are narrow and high. The bichromatic floor, made of marble from Mount Orlando, is decorated along the nave with several inlaid rose windows that recall the neo-Gothic decorations on the walls.

Abutting the pillars dividing the three arches are twelve travertine statues depicting the Apostles. Each rests on a richly decorated marble shelf and is surmounted by a hanging canopy adorned with small spires. The sculptures were made by the brothers Giuseppe and Antonio d'Annibale.

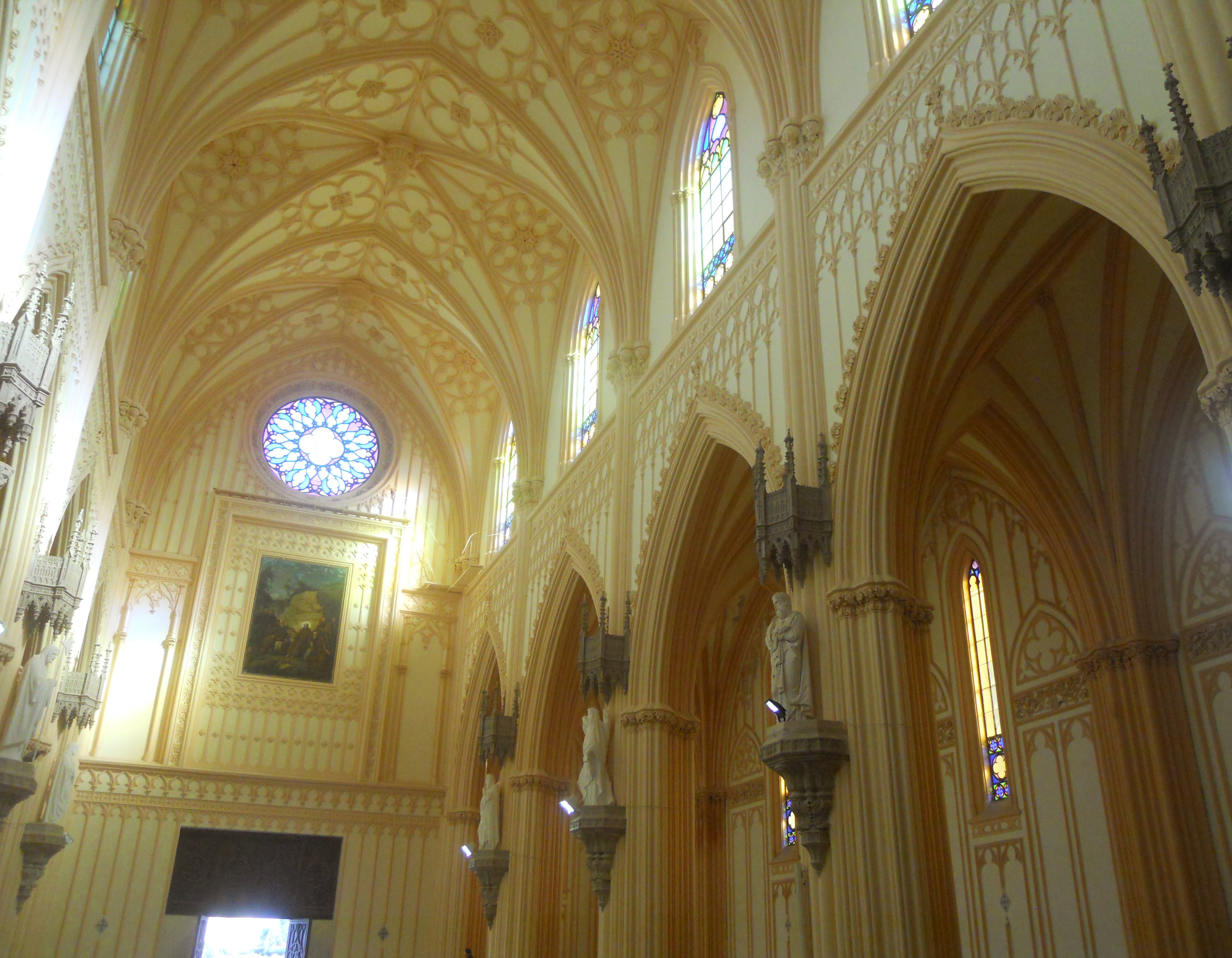
Interior toward the counterfacade.

In the upper part of the counterfacade wall, below the rose window and in axis with the latter and the portal, is the canvas depicting St. Francis showing the Stigmata: this is a copy made by Giuseppe Sabbione in 1887 of a painting by Michele De Napoli from 1851, which had been designed to be placed above the church's high altar, but since the design of the latter's altarpiece had been changed, it could not be placed in the building.

Each of the two side aisles ends with a wall behind which is an altar in polychrome marble, with neo-Gothic decoration of small arches, mullioned windows and rose windows, as well as a tabernacle whose cover consists of a tall octagonal spire. Originally, the two altars were surmounted by as many altarpieces, which were removed when the church was closed in 1998: on the altar of the Blessed Sacrament is Jesus on the Cross (by Gennaro Ruo); on the altar of the Most Holy Sorrows is the Virgin of Sorrows (by Angelo Scetta). The right altar was later dedicated to St. John Bosco and adorned with an altarpiece depicting the dedicatee.

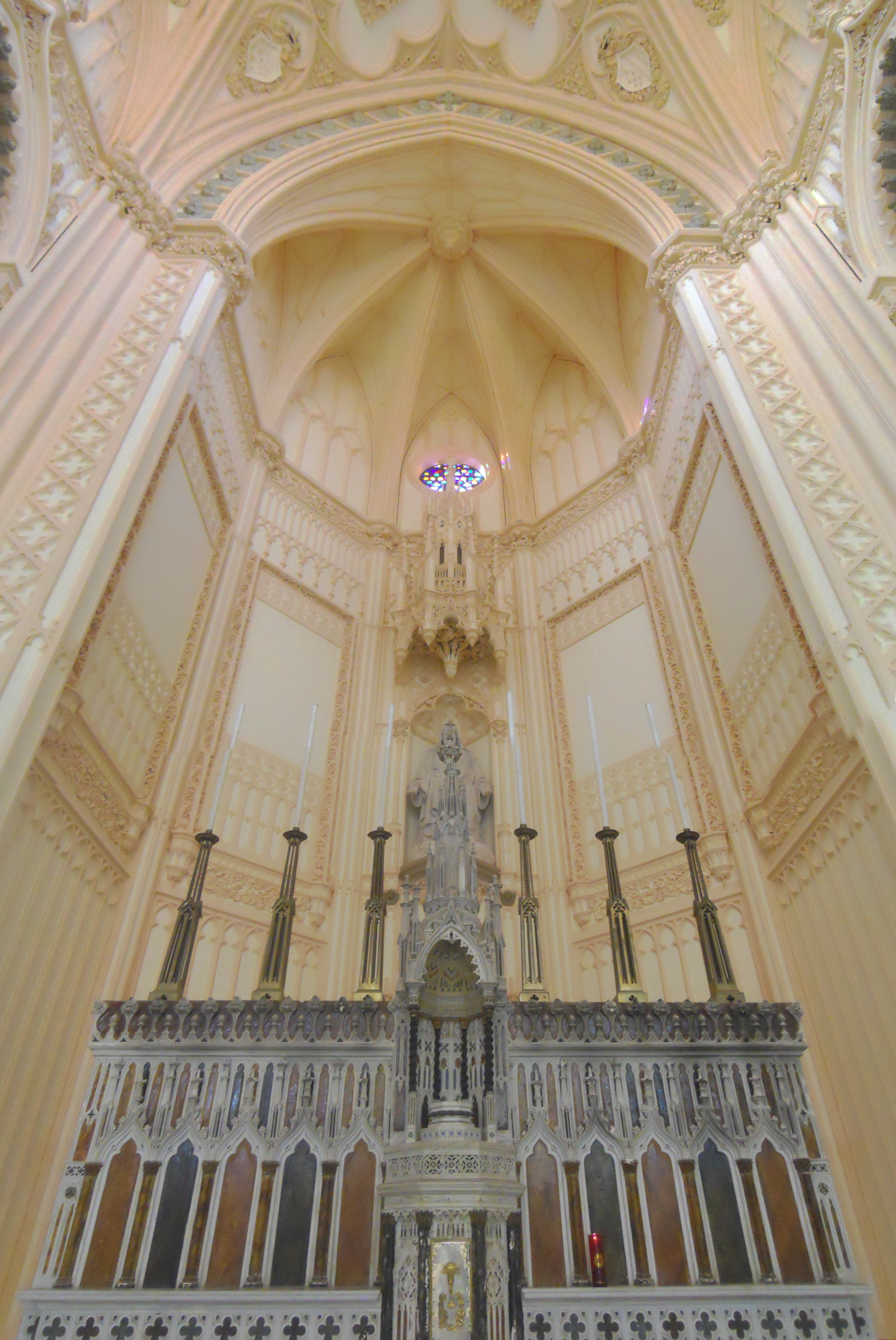
The high altar and the apse.

The main nave, compared to the two smaller ones, in addition to the sixth bay (which, compared to the previous ones, is shallower as it corresponds to the ancient apse of the thirteenth-century church) has another one, formerly used as a presbytery, whose floor is placed at a higher level than the hall and is connected to it by a series of steps. The room, covered with a cross vault decorated with the coats of arms of the royal family, is lit not by two single-lancet windows, but by two rose windows, below which open, with three pointed arches, two women's galleries: the one on the left, with independent access from the outside, was used as a royal box, while the one on the right (destroyed by a bomb during World War II, on September 8, 1943, and later rebuilt without, however, restoring its decorations) as a chancel.

The chancel ends with the 19th-century apse, whose plan consists of five sides of an octagon, outside of which is a two-story vaulted corridor. Its four side walls were originally adorned with as many Baroque canvases, now partly in the Diocesan Museum, partly in Gaeta Cathedral: Girolamo Imparato's Virgin of the Assumption (16th century), Francesco Solimena's Rest on the Flight into Egypt (18th century), Circumcision of Jesus and Adoration of the Magi (both by the Neapolitan school, 17th century). In the central one is a niche, with a travertine statue of Christ the Redeemer enthroned, by the d'Annibale brothers, surmounted by a sumptuous neo-Gothic ciborium. Above it is a small circular rose window closed by a polychrome stained-glass window.

Under the apsidal arch is the high altar, in finely carved stucco with rich neo-Gothic architectural decoration in relief. Above the mensa, in the center, is the tabernacle, surmounted by a baldachin with a high cusp with an octagonal base. In the original plan, above this altar was to be a canvas by Michele De Napoli, a copy of which is located on the counterfacade.

=== Pipe organ ===
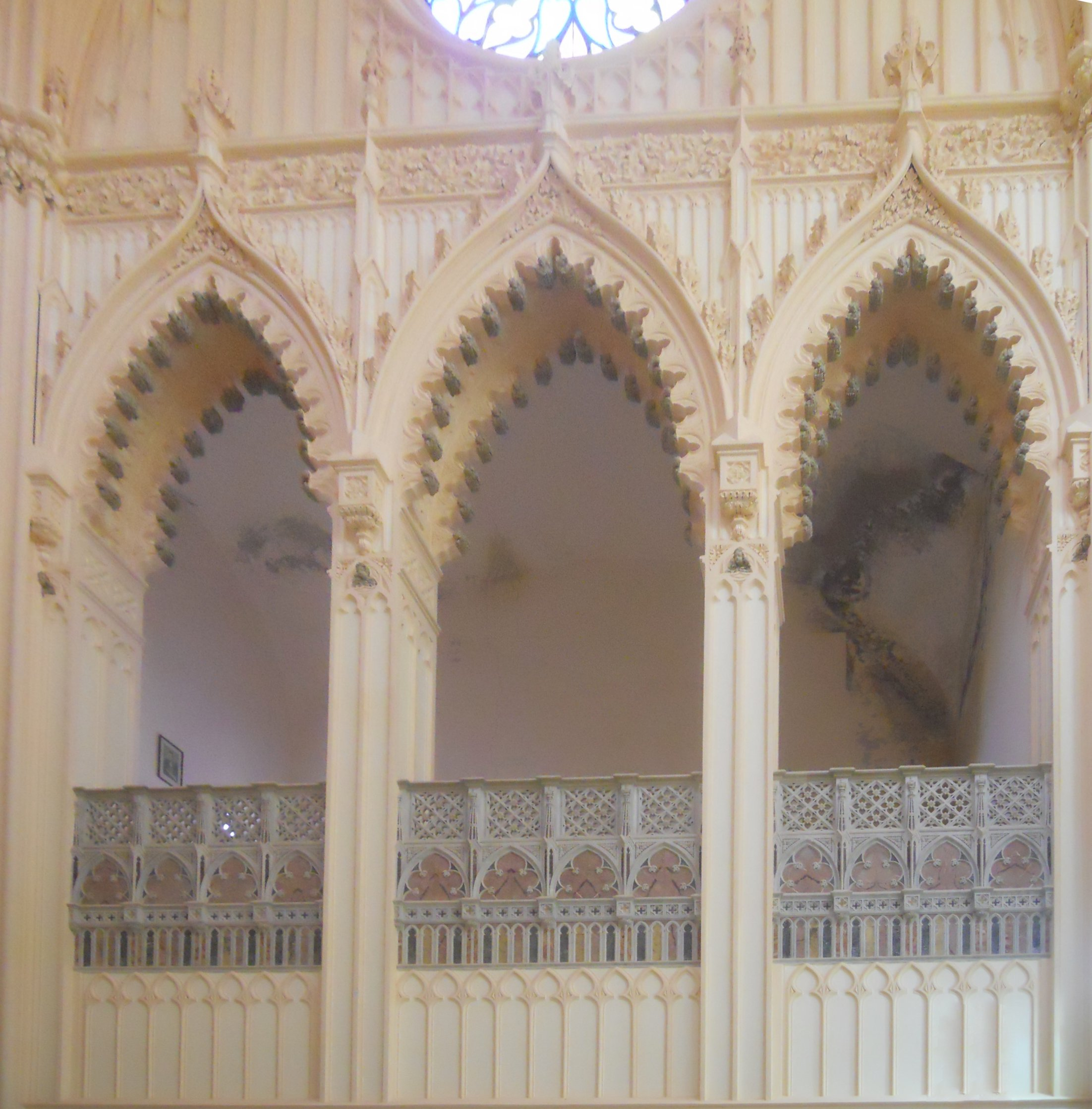
The right women's gallery, formerly used as a chancel, where the large pipe organ would have been located. Note the total absence, on the walls and vault, of the stucco decoration, which was lost during the bombing of September 8, 1943.

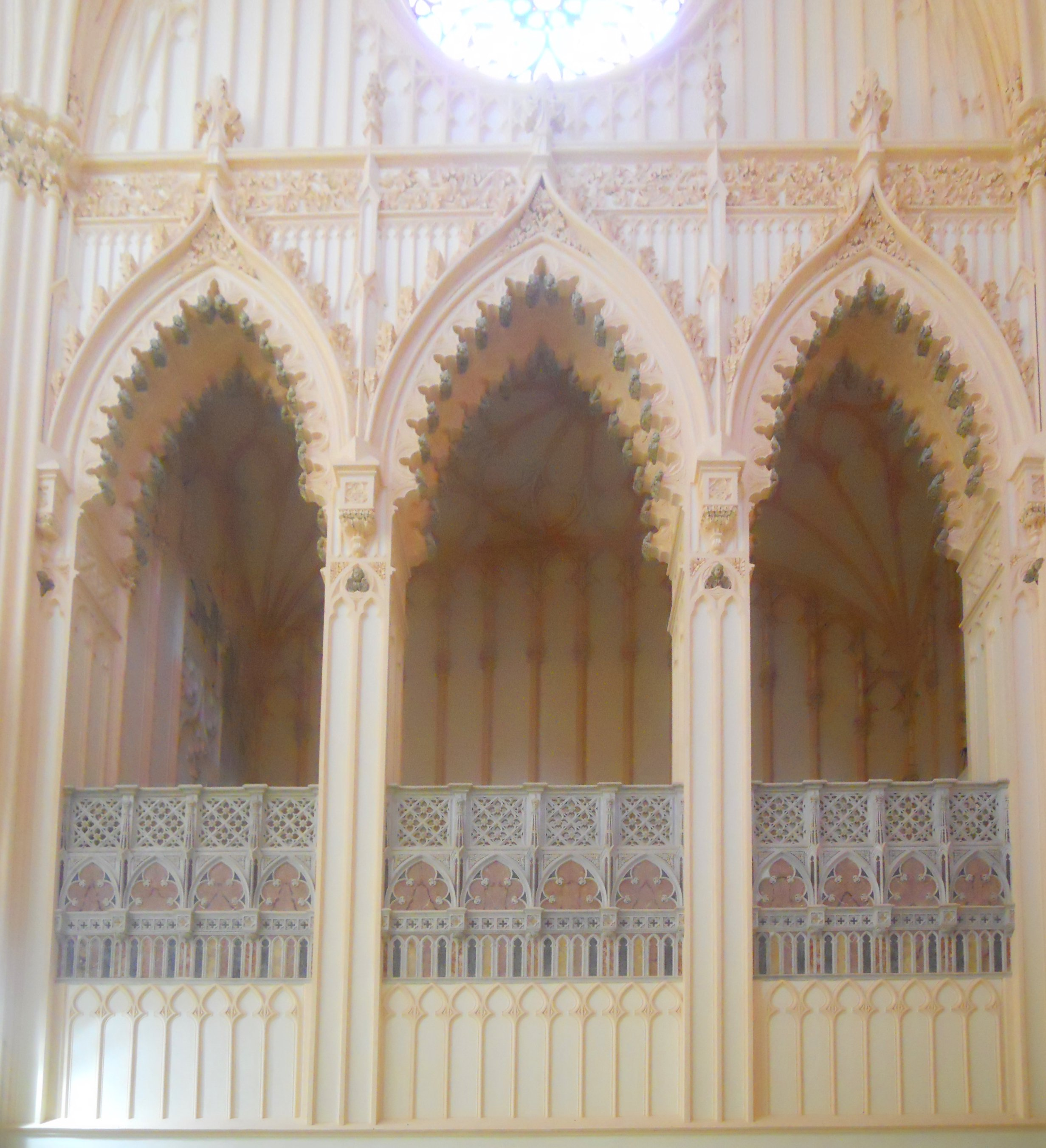
The left women's gallery, formerly used as a royal box.

There is no pipe organ in the church. Until World War II, in the right women's gallery of the chancel, used as a choir loft, was a small instrument from the late 19th century, which was destroyed along with the room by the bombing of September 8, 1943.

Guarinelli's original design also included a "large organ," for which the government had provided 7,000 ducats, as per the contract with the builder; the instrument would have been large and probably would have had over 2,000 pipes. Ferdinand II of the Two Sicilies would have wished to endow the church with a three-keyboard organ similar to the one in the basilica of San Francesco di Paola in Naples; the latter had recently been built by organ builder Quirico Gènnari (originally from Rovigo) and had about 4,000 pipes (it was destroyed between 1944 and 1945 and was not subsequently rebuilt).

Guarinelli, in the project for the church of San Francesco, also designed the case that was to enclose the instrument: it would have been located on the right women's gallery (which was actually later used as a choir loft), and would have been built in the neo-Gothic style, an unprecedented design in Italian organ history.

The organ was supposed to be ready for the inauguration of the church, scheduled for July 1860. However, following the death of Ferdinand II (May 22, 1859) and the events of the Risorgimento, restoration work on the building came to a halt, and the instrument was never built or, though built at least in part, never installed in the church.

=== Former convent ===
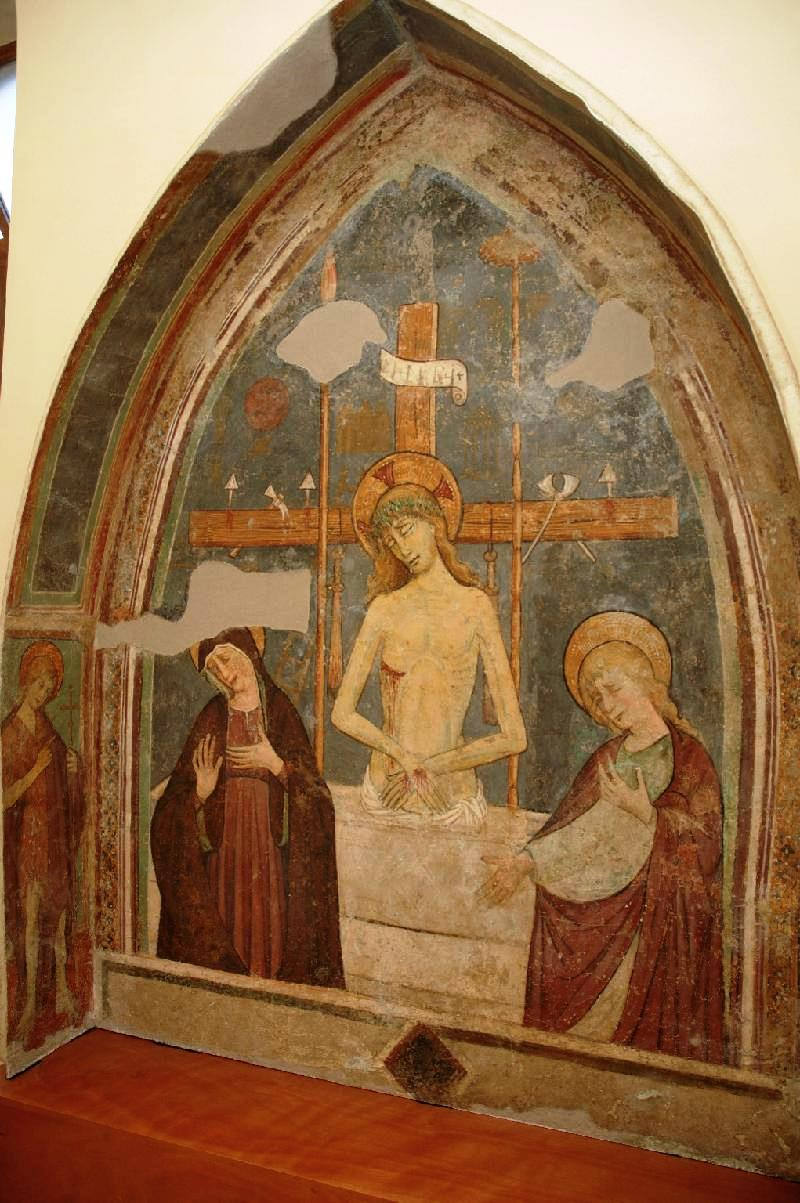
The fresco of Christ in Pity among the Mourners and Saint John the Baptist by Giovanni da Gaeta, from the refectory and now in the Diocesan Museum of Gaeta.

Attached to the temple is the former convent, set back from the church; the main façade, along Via De Lieto, is perpendicular to the external entrance of the left women's gallery and is devoid of any particular decorative elements except for the masonry frames of the portal (surmounted by the inscription "Oratorio Don Bosco") and some of the rectangular windows. The building is articulated around the quadrangular cloister of 14th-century origin, the floor level of which is considerably raised above that of the nave and women's gallery of the temple because of the steep slope on which the complex is built; greatly modified and altered over the centuries like the entire convent building, it currently has only two of the four original galleries, covered with ogival cross vaults and with round arches resting on bare columns (many of them without capitals) toward the open space, the latter incorporated within other arches due to the enlargement of the upper floors; in the center of the courtyard is the stone wellhead, squared off and flanked by two columns, while along the walls are walled up some stone fragments of various periods.

From the refectory of the convent comes a fresco currently detached and exhibited together with its sinopia in the Diocesan Museum and of the Religiousness of the Aurunci Mountains Park in Gaeta, the only surviving piece of a larger wall decoration of the room and datable to around 1470; it is the work of Giovanni di Gaeta and bears strong similarities to two other panel paintings by the local painter, the coeval Pietà among angels from the church of Santa Maria in Piazza in Fondi and the Shaped Crucifix from the former church of Santa Lucia in Gaeta, dating from the 1460s. The fresco originally adorned an ogival niche and features Christ in Pietà between the Madonna and St. John the Evangelist on the wall, while of the two figures on the intrados only the one on the left with St. John the Baptist remains.

== See also ==
- Gothic Revival architecture
- Francis of Assisi
- Gaeta

== Bibliography ==
- Ceraso, Cornelio (1690). Breve descrittione delle cose più notabili di Gaeta. Napoli: Giacomo Raillard.
- Gregorio di Forio, ed. (1842). Vita del padre San Francesco di Assisi. Napoli: Gaetano Rusconi.
- Guarinelli, Giacomo (1853). Brevi cenni sulle costruzioni militari, civili ed ecclesiastiche eseguite in Gaeta dal 1835 sin oggi per Giacomo Guarinelli. Napoli: Stab. Tipografico di Gaetano Nobile.
- Gaetani d'Aragona, Onorato (1885). Memorie storiche della città di Gaeta. Caserta.
- Charles Henderson jr., ed. (1964). Classical Mediaeval and Renaissance Studies in honor of Berthold Louis Ullman. Roma: Edizioni di storia e letteratura.
- Allaria, Giuseppe (1970). Le chiese di Gaeta. Latina: Ente Provinciale per il Turismo e Camera di Commercio.
- Maria Letizia Casanova, ed. (1976). Arte a Gaeta: dipinti dal XII al XVIII secolo. Firenze: Stiav.
- Fronzuto, Graziano (2001). Monumenti d'arte sacra a Gaeta: storia ed arte dei maggiori edifici religiosi di Gaeta. Gaeta: Edizioni del Comune di Gaeta.
- Granata, Piergiorgio (2004). Gaeta: viaggio nell'arte: pittura, scultura e arti minori dal medioevo ad oggi. Napoli: Guida. ISBN 978-88-7188-745-6.
- Giampaolo Carlesimo; Veronica Rosella (2006). Daniela Concas; Cesare Crova; Graziella Frezza (eds.). "Chiesa di San Giuda Taddeo, Gaeta". Le Architetture Religiose Nel Golfo di Gaeta. Scauri: Caliman Studio: 58–61. ISBN 88-900982-1-1.
- Tallini, Gennaro (2006). Gaeta: una città nella storia. Gaeta: Edizioni del Comune di Gaeta.
- Maria Carolina Campone (2009). "Architettura sacra alla Corte dei Borbone: il revival gotico della Chiesa di S. Francesco a Gaeta". Arte Cristiana. Milano: Scuola Beato Angelico: 134–145. ISSN 0004-3400.
- Macaro, Carlo (2008). La Diocesi di Gaeta nel '700. Fondi: Tipolitografia C.O.R.E.
- Arcidiocesi di Gaeta, ed. (2014). Annuario Diocesano 2014 (PDF). Fondi: Arti grafiche Kolbe. Archived from the original (PDF) on 13 March 2016.
- Tommaso Scalesse (2018). "Le chiese degli Ordini mendicanti a Gaeta: San Domenico e San Francesco". In Mario d'Onofrio; Manuela Gianandrea (eds.). Gaeta medievale e la sua cattedrale. Roma: Campisano. pp. 171–182.
