= Maurizio Delvecchio =

Italian painter (born 1962)

Maurizio Delvecchio (born 22 May 1962) is an Italian painter. He was born in Basel, Switzerland into an Italian family.

Back in Italy, with his parents, he graduated from the Art School in Ravenna. In 1985 he graduated from the Academy of Fine Arts in Ravenna. He lives and works in Cesenatico (FC).

He participated in the 54 Biennale of Art in Venice in 2011.

== Works in museums ==
- Museo d'arte of Avellino (Italy) with Il Tramonto e l'attesa … (2013).
- Museo permanente di Arte Contemporanea of Amatrice (RI) (Italy).

== Bibliography ==
- (IT) A.A.V.V.(2008), Delvecchio. Silenziosamente - Sole al sole, Gesturist Cesenatico, Cesenatico 2008, pp. (44).
- (IT) TUROLA Gabriele (2005), Delvecchio. Il velo che copre le cose, Edizioni d'arte Coinè, Forlì 2005, pp. (24).
