= Paola Romano =

Italian painter and sculptor (1951)

Paola Romano (17 September 1951 - 15 September 2021) was an Italian painter and sculptor.

Romano was born in Monterotondo, Rome. She began her artistic training in Rome, where she attended classes at the Rome University of Fine Arts (RUFA).

She participated in the 54 Biennale of Art in Venice in 2011.

== Works in museums ==
- Museo d'arte of Avellino (Italy) with sculpture Luna sospesa bianca (2011).

== Bibliography ==
- (IT) (EN) A.A.V.V., Paola Romano. Il mare della tranquillità, Maretti Editore, Falciano (RSM) 2011, pp. 139.

== Other websites ==
- Biography from arteromano.net (in Italian)
