= Francesco Tito =

Italian painter

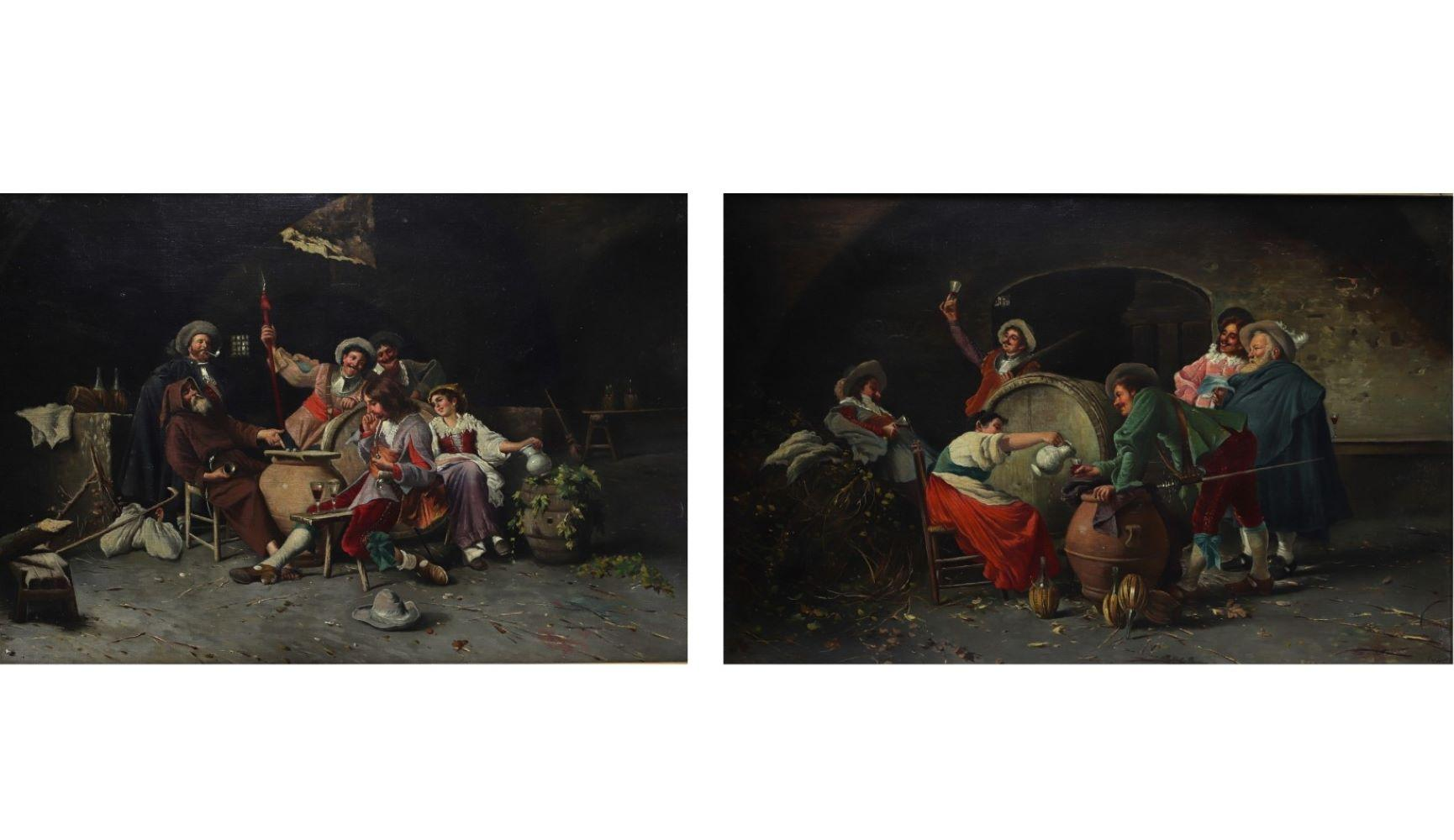
"Le repas des mousquetaires" (The Musketeers' Meal) by Francesco Tito (1863-1934)

Francesco Tito (Naples, 1863 - 1934) was an Italian painter, mainly of portraits and genre scenes in a Neoclassic style.

Tito was born in Naples in October 1863. He first studied at the Royal Academy of Fine Arts in Naples, before entering Vincenzo Petrocelli's workshop, where he gained skills particularly in genre scenes.

In 1881 at the Promotrice of Naples, he exhibited several paintings, such as Ciò che mi resta or Un momento d'attenzione. At the 1882 International Exposition at Rome, he displayed L'uccellino del mio nido; at the Promotrici of Genoa, Verona, and Milan : Momenti di gioia. At the Exposition at Milan, he also exhibited a painting titled Winter. At the Promotrice of Naples, he exhibited Woods of Capodimonte.
