= Giovan Francesco Gonzaga =

Italian painter and sculptor (1921–2007)

Giovan Francesco Gonzaga was an Italian painter and sculptor. He was born on June 12, 1921, in Milan. He died on October 2, 2007, in Milan.

== Biography ==
As a teen he attended the Sforza Castle of Milan where he used to copy the works of artists such as Leonardo and Michelangelo. He never had any formal training in painting.

Gonzaga had a distinct and peculiar style. The most frequent subjects are horses, riders, still lives, soldiers, portraits, and landscapes, besides traditional sacred subjects such as crucifixions and portraits of the Virgin Mary.

=== Museums in Italy ===
- Museo d'arte of Avellino with I due corsieri (1995) and Paesaggio bergamasco (2000).
- Museo del Reggimento Savoia Cavalleria of Grosseto with Soldati del Savoia Cavalleria.
- Museo storico dell'arma di cavalleria of Pinerolo (TO).
- Museo storico della Guardia di Finanza of Rome with Il finanziere.

== Bibliography ==
- CARISIO Fabio, "Giovan Francesco Gonzaga incanta anche con La Rossa”, reportage Art & Wine n. 19, edizioni Gospa
- A.A.V.V., Giovan Francesco Gonzaga, Il Salotto, Milano 1997, pp. 61.
- A.A.V.V., Gonzaga, Il Salotto, Milano 2002, pp.(7).
- A.A.V.V., Giovan Francesco Gonzaga. Serigrafie 2004-2005, Edizioni Telemarket Communication, Roncadelle (BS) 2005, pp.(57).
- A.A.V.V., Esposizione di opere del maestro Giovan Francesco Gonzaga, Il Salotto, Milano 2012, pp. 15.
- BONI Francesco - CIVIELLO Renato, Giovan Francesco Gonzaga, Il Salotto, Milano 1993, pp.(15).
- FALOSSI Giorgio - MONTEVERDI Mario, Gonzaga, F.lli Verga, Milano 1980, pp. (12).
- LEVI Paolo - SGARBI Vittorio, Catalogo generale delle opere di Giovan Francesco Gonzaga. Primo volume, Editoriale Giorgio Mondatori, Milano 2006, pp. 655.

== Other websites ==
- biography from gonzagagiovanfrancesco.com (in Italian)
- biographical notes from ilsalotto.it (in Italian)
- biographical notes from telemarket.com (in Italian)
