= Petrucelli =

Petrucelli is a surname. Notable people with the surname include:

- Chris Petrucelli (born 1962), American soccer manager
- John Petrucelli (born 1992), American-Italian basketballer
- Michael Petrucelli, American executive

== See also ==
- Jack Petruccelle (born 1999), Australian footballer
- Petrocelli (surname), surname
