= Vincenzo Petrocelli =

Italian painter

- Born: Vincenzo Pasquale Angelo Petrocelli; 6 July 1823; Cervaro, Kingdom of the Two Sicilies
- Died: 2 February 1896 (aged 72); Naples, Italy
- Education: Accademia di Belle Arti di Napoli under the guidance of Domenico Morelli
- Known for: Romanticism, historical themes
- Notable work: Frescoes in the Temple of St. Francis, Gaeta
- Movement: Neapolitan painting
- Awards: Knight of the Order of the Crown of Italy (1868)

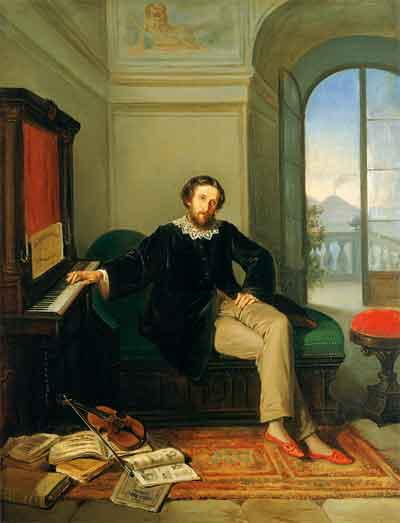
Portrait of Nikolai Yusupov, 1851

Vincenzo Pasquale Angelo Petrocelli (6 July 1823 – 2 February 1896) was a Neapolitan artist.

Petrocelli was born in Cervaro in the Kingdom of the Two Sicilies (now in Lazio). He studied under Domenico Morelli, and was active as a painter from about 1850. He was principally a history painter, but also painted portraits and genre scenes. His sons Achille and Arturo were both painters.

== Life ==
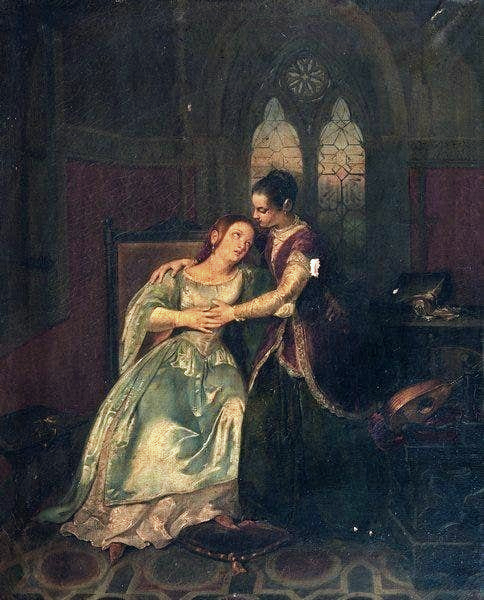
Isabella of Florence

Petrocelli was born in Cervaro in the Kingdom of the Two Sicilies (now in the Province of Frosinone in Lazio). His father died when he was young. From 1837 or about 1841 he studied at the Reale Istituto di Belle Arti in Naples, where he made copies of Old Masters and painted literary and historical subjects.

His debut came at the Royal Bourbon Exhibition of 1839. He participated again on several occasions, notably in 1841 (The Death of Galeazzo Sforza), 1848 (Isabella of Florence) and 1851 (A Family of Neophytes Surprised by the Praetorian Guard). Over the next decade, he would focus more on genre scenes.

From 1862 until his death, he was a regular contributor to exhibitions at the "Society for the Promotion of the Fine Arts". After 1873, he also exhibited in Genoa and Milan. His largest showing came in 1877 at the National Exhibition in Naples, which was visited by King Victor Emmanuel II. Shortly after, he and several others were chosen to create a series of frescoes at the Temple of St. Francis in Gaeta; designed many years before by his former fellow student, Domenico Morelli. The project was never completed.

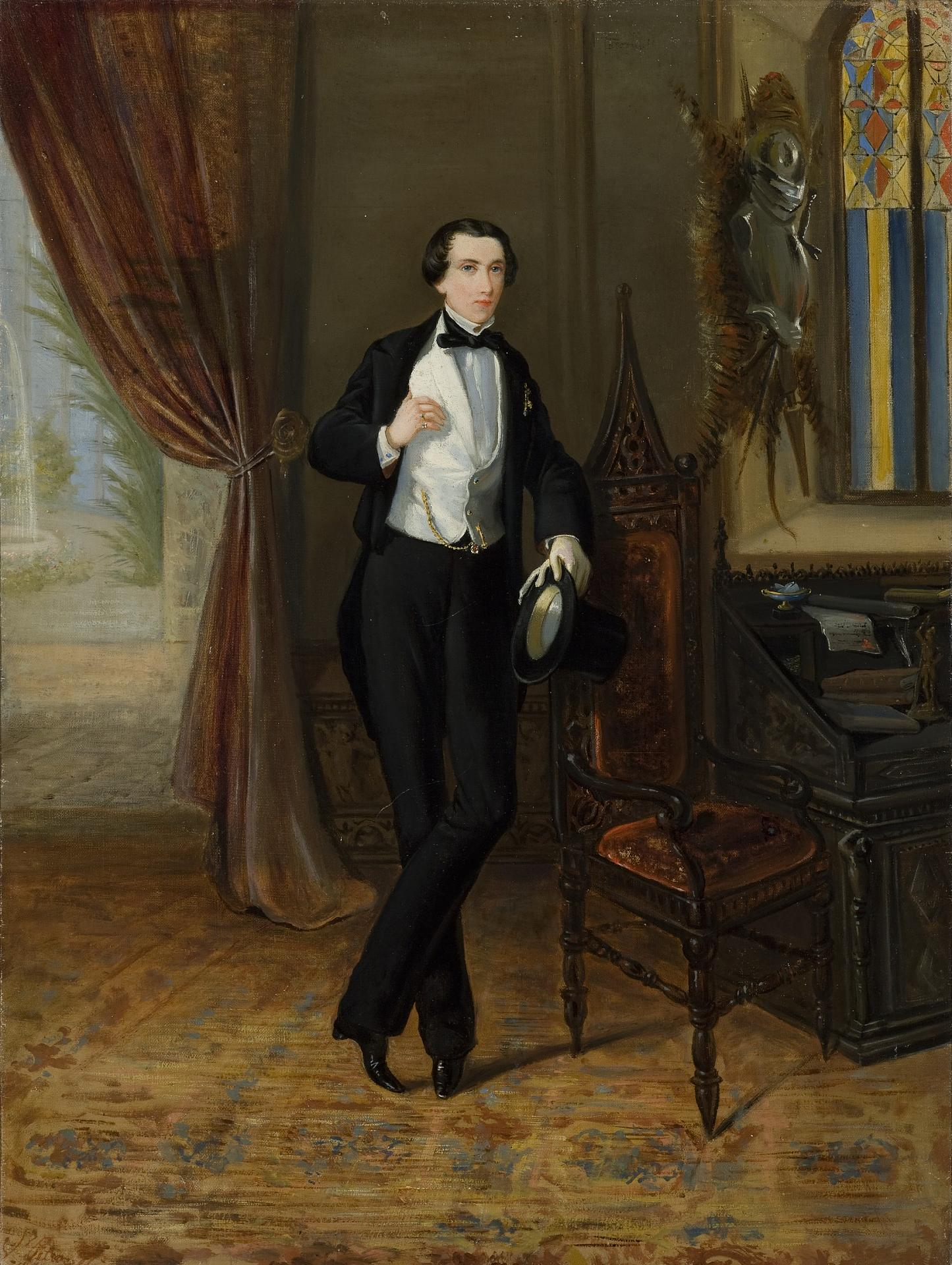
Portrait of the Young Prince Nikolai Yusupov

His sons Achille and Arturo both became genre painters. Among his pupils was Francesco Tito. In Italy, his works may be seen at the Museo di Capodimonte and the museum in the Royal Palace of Caserta.

He was a capable copyist of Old Master paintings; one of his works was sold in Milan as a Rubens.

Petrocelli died in Naples. Vincenzo Gemito made a terracotta bust of him in about 1869.
