= Cesenatico =

- Comune
- Comune di Cesenatico
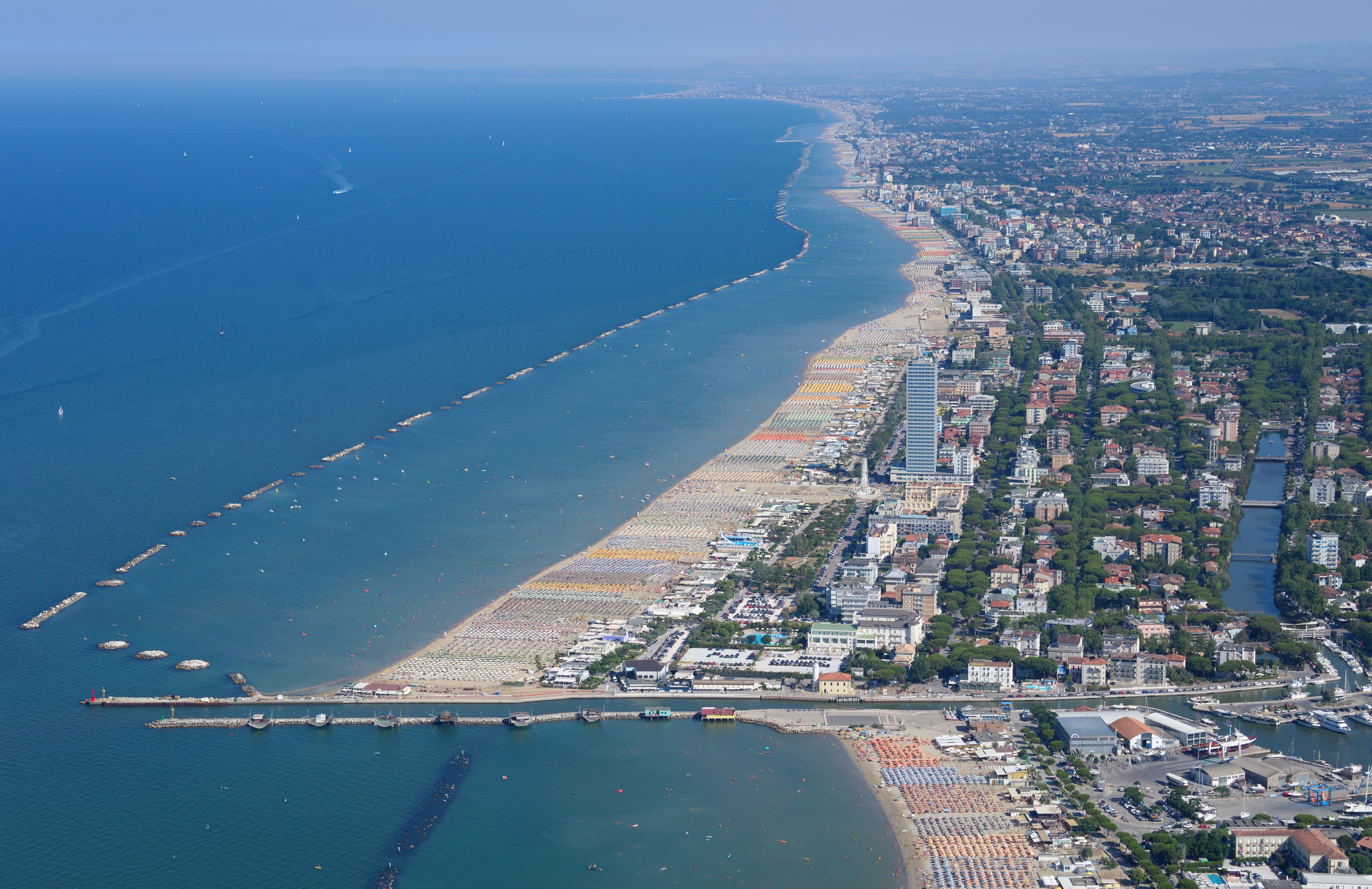
- Aerial view of Cesenatico

- Flag

- Location within Italy Location within Emilia-Romagna
- Coordinates: 44°12′00″N 12°23′40″E
- Country: Italy
- Region: Emilia-Romagna
- Province: Forlì-Cesena (FC)
- Frazioni: See list

Government
  - Mayor: Matteo Gozzoli

Area
  - Total: 45.16 km^{2} (17.44 sq mi)
- Elevation: 2 m (6.6 ft)

Population (30 June 2017)
  - Total: 25,760
  - Density: 570.4/km^{2} (1,477/sq mi)
- Demonym: Cesenaticensi
- Time zone: UTC+1 (CET)
  - Summer (DST): UTC+2 (CEST)
- Postal code: 47042
- Dialing code: 0547
- Patron saint: St. James Apostle
- Saint day: July 25
- Website: Official website

Cesenatico (Romagnol: Ziznàtic) is a port town with about 26,000 inhabitants on the Adriatic coast of Italy. It is located in the province of Forlì-Cesena in the region of Emilia-Romagna, about 30 kilometres (19 mi) south of Ravenna. Cesenatico's port canal was surveyed and drawn by Leonardo da Vinci at the request of Cesare Borgia, as part of his plans to fortify the nearby town of Cesena.

== History ==
Cesenatico was founded in 1302. It was considered part of the city of Cesena until it was incorporated at the beginning of the 18th century. Its port and canal were built in 1314, with the canal originally planned to reach Cesena, some 15 kilometres (9 mi) inland. At the request of Cesare Borgia the canal was later surveyed by Leonardo da Vinci. It is often erroneously claimed that da Vinci designed the canal. In 1722 James Francis Edward Stuart (the 'Old Pretender' to the British throne) stayed in Cesenatico's Capuchin monastery.

=== 1860–present ===
The Republican vocation of Cesenatico is evident in the elections of the following years, but this did not naturally prevent it from escaping fascism. The war damages were so enormous that it had to be rebuilt almost entirely. The municipal building, the aqueduct tower, the lighthouse, the pier and all the boats, the fish market, the schools as well as the villages of Villalta, Sala, Cannucceto, Villamarina, Bagnarola practically razed to the ground. The nightmare vanished on October 20, 1944, with the entry of the New Zealand allies.

The restoration and reconstruction work was immediately restarted. In 1945 the fishermen's cooperative was founded and a new impulse was given to the tourism that will lead Cesenatico to excel in this field. Many of the old "villas" were converted into hotels, new colonies were started (one of the first was the 12 Star Colony, aimed at children from the autonomous province of Bolzano, without language distinctions), and the construction of the famous skyscraper gave launching a new era focused on mass tourism.

Today Cesenatico has about 22,000 hotel beds, with 3 million admissions per season. In 1966 the municipal library was founded; in the same year the coastal city was one of the first municipalities in Europe to start twinning projects with other cities. In 1977 a project of historical-archaeological recovery was brought to light and in the eighties the guidelines were introduced that launched Cesenatico from a global and European perspective.

== Monuments and places of interest ==
=== Museums ===
- Seafaring Museum: it is the most famous museum in the city and the only floating museum in Italy, which allows tourists to visit the most important moored ships, called "Bragozzo" and "Trabaccolo". Both boats had a transport and fishing version. The museum is located in the oldest part of the historical port-canal, which has a long maritime history behind it.
- Marino Moretti's house museum: Marino Moretti was a famous poet who was born in Cesenatico.
- Spazio Pantani: it is a structure directly managed by the Pantani family to keep alive the memory of the cycling champion Marco Pantani.

=== Municipal library ===
The municipal library, founded in 1966, is now located in a building of fascist era in Piazza Ciceruacchio. The book collections currently amount to about 60 000 books and the library has around 100 places for study, consultation and reading.

=== University ===
Cesenatico hosts one of the seats of the Department of Veterinary Medical Sciences (University of Bologna), for the bachelor's degree in "Aquaculture and Fish Production Hygiene".

=== Religious architecture ===
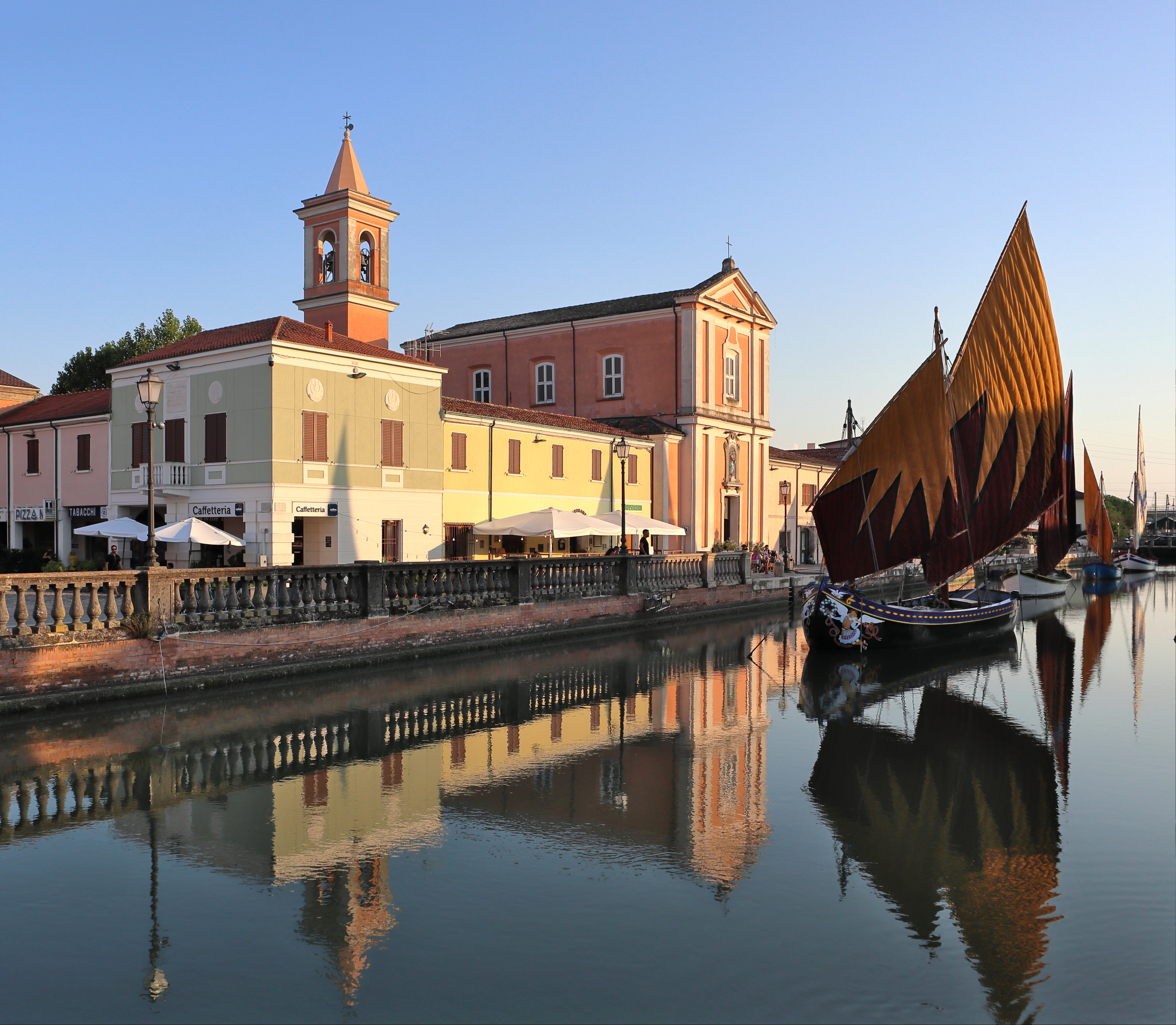
Facade of the church of St James Apostle facing the historic boats

- Parish church of San Giacomo Apostolo. Dating back to 1324, the current structure was defined in 1763, designed by Pietro Bastoni. Inside, there are some interesting works, among others by Guido Cagnacci. The external façade sees the historic boats of Leonardo's canal port.
- Church of San Giuseppe.
- Church of San Pietro Pescatore.
- Church of the Capuchin friars, or Church of Saints Nicola di Mira and Francesco d'Assisi. It dates back to 1611, while the convent is three years later. Inside, there is a painting of Saint Michael by the painter of Forlì school Gianfrancesco Modigliani.

== Society ==
=== Traditions and folklore ===
From 1986 on the boats of the Maritime Museum the Nativity of the Marineria was set up. During the Christmas period, from the first Sunday of December until the Epiphany, the boats of the Floating Section of the Maritime Museum become the stage of the Marine Nativity Scene. The crib was born in 1986 and is the work of the artists Tinin Mantegazza, Maurizio Bertoni and Mino Savadori, from an original idea by Guerrino Gardini. The first sculpted statue was that of San Giacomo, patron saint of Cesenatico to whom many others have been added over the years. These are not just traditional statues that can be seen in the cribs, but glimpses inspired by the life of the common people of a fishing village: fishermen, carpenters, puppeteers.

Every year the crib is enriched with a new statue and a new character. From the seven figures with which they debuted in 1986 today the sculptural heritage is about fifty statues. This is how the project of the artists Bertoni and Savadori was carried out in order to equip each of the boats of a helmsman and a crewman over the years. The figures are thought of as elements of a representation, to be seen from the banks of the Leonardesco Canal Port as well as from an audience; illuminated, because in the crib are the lights that give life to the figures and mark the story.

== Main sights ==
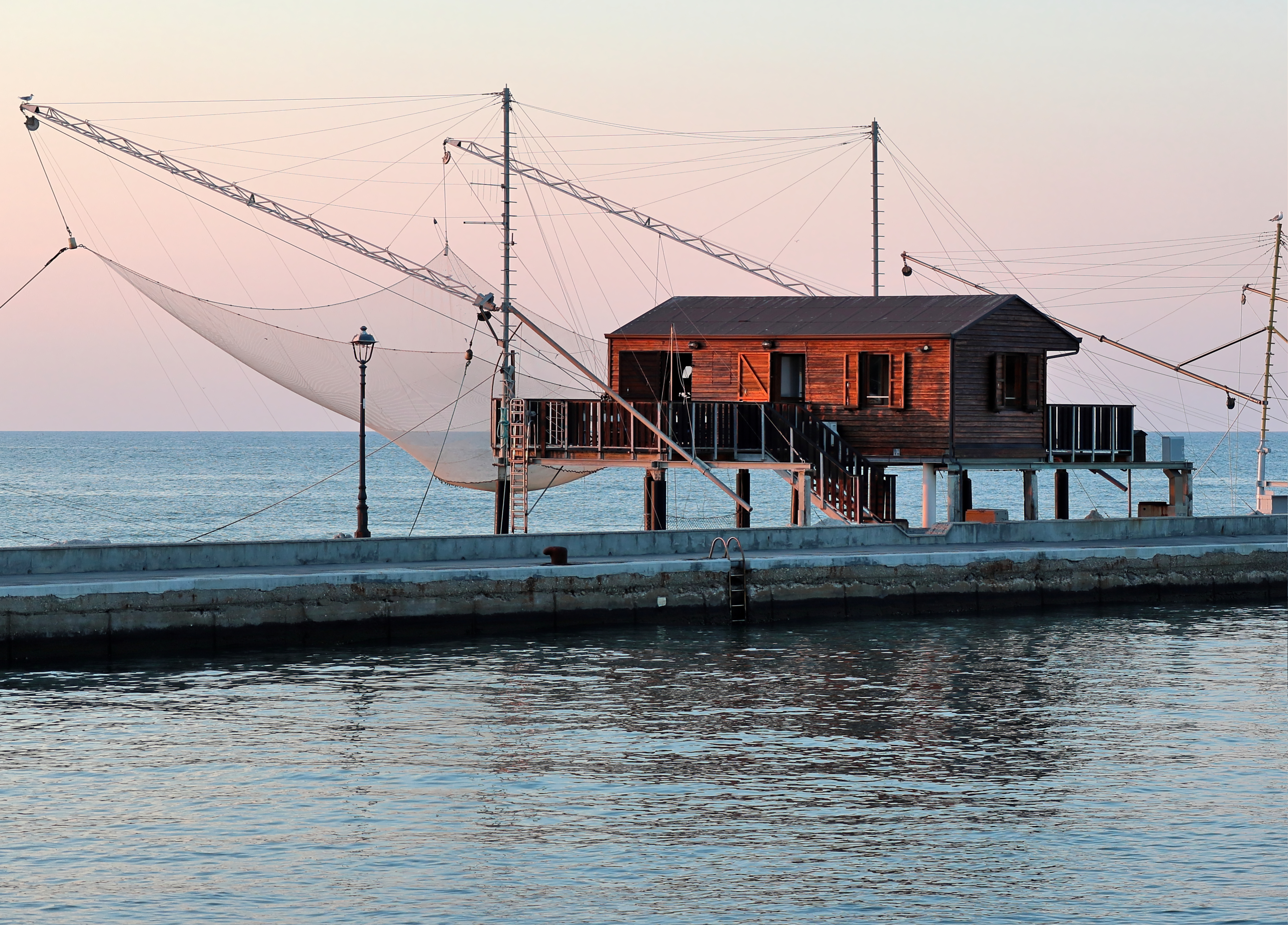
Fishing house or trabucco on the canal port of Cesenatico

Today Cesenatico is a tourist resort. It is home to the Museum of Seafaring (Museo della Marineria di Cesenatico), where historic fishing boats are displayed in the canal. There are also trabucco, or fishing houses.

In the coastal city of Cesenatico, the port canal (in Italian Porto Canale Leonardesco) has always been the leading element of the historical city centre: it was the engine of the economy of the city, which relied on maritime trade and fishing and nowadays it is an outstanding point of interest for tourists, which are also attracted by the floating exhibit of the Museum of Seafaring.

The town also features a 118-metre (387 ft) high skyscraper, which for a few years was among the 30 highest buildings in Europe.

== Notable people ==
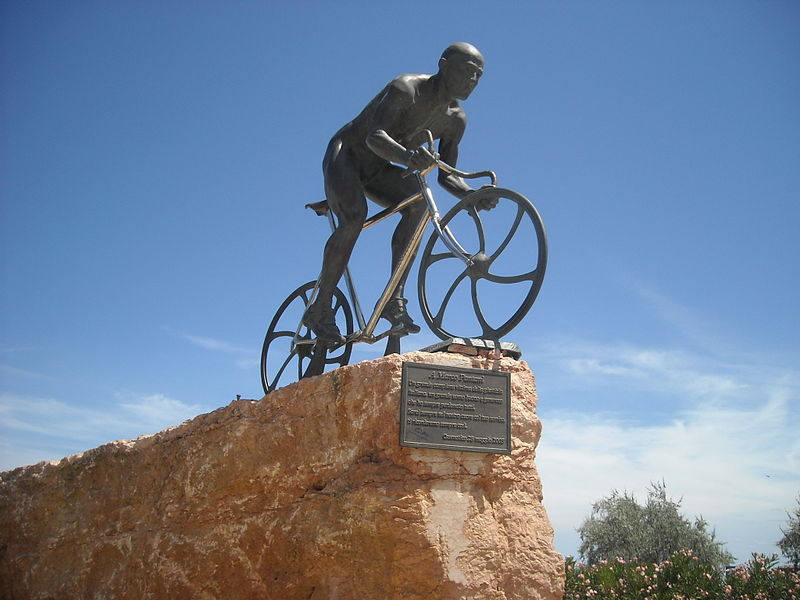
Statue of Marco Pantani

- Marcella Hazan (1924–2013), cookbook author
- Emilio Pericoli (1928–2013), singer
- Giorgio Ghezzi (1930–1990), football goalkeeper and manager, 447 caps
- Maurizio Delvecchio (born 1962), painter, lives and works in Cesenatico
- Marco Pantani (1970–2004), road racing cyclist
- Mattia Graffiedi (born 1980), footballer, over 350 caps
- Dalia Muccioli (born 1993), racing cyclist

== Events ==
Cesenatico hosts every year the final stage of the Italian Mathematics Olympiad, a mathematical battle of wits between the best 300 high school students in Italy. It is usually held in the week-end following the first Thursday of May.

Cesenatico holds the Annual "Marco Pantani Nove Colli" cycling road event across nine of the Apennine foothills in May of each year. Other events associated include the Nove Colli Off Road and Junior Event in September each year.

== Suburbs ==
Bagnarola, Borella, Cannucceto, Sala, Valverde, Villalta, Villamarina, Zadina.

== Twin towns – sister cities ==
Twin cities sign in Cesenatico

The town is twinned with:

- Aubenas, France
- Schwarzenbek, Germany
- Delfzijl, Netherlands
- Sierre, Switzerland
- Zelzate, Belgium
