= Museo d'arte, Avellino =

Art museum in Avellino, Italy

Museo d'Arte
- Established: 2 January 1995
- Location: Via Degli Imbimbo, 83100 Avellino, Italy
- Coordinates: 40.9167°N 14.7833°E
- Type: Modern art and contemporary art museum
- Collection size: Sculptures, drawings, oil paintings, and prints

The Museo d'Arte is a museum for modern and contemporary art in Avellino, Italy.

The museum opened on 2 January 1995. It was developed from the private gallery of O. Stefano into a museum open to the public. The design for the museum building was ready in September 1993 and was finished in December 1994.

The museum has a library and a documentary film library. It plays video documentaries and speeches by art critics.

== Collection ==
The museum exhibition presents selected works of modern art and contemporary art. The original works include sculptures, drawings, oil paintings, and prints done by etching, lithograph, and serigraph.

== Artists ==
Artists in the museum's permanent exhibition include:

=== Nineteenth century ===
- Francesco Saverio Altamura (1822–1897): Ritratto di scolaretta a Capri (1893)
- Giovanni Battista (1858–1925): Pescatori sulla scogliera (1886) and Pescatori a Sorrento (1892)
- Pietro Bouvier (1839–1927): La cacciagione (1897)
- Gabriele Carelli (1820–1900): Convento dei Cappuccini, Amalfi (1899)
- Giovanni Colmo (1867–1947): Alberi intrecciati (1915)
- Antonio Coppola (1850–1916): Napoli paescatori (1876)
- Achille D'Orsi (1845–1929): Scugnizzo: acquaiolo (1915)
- Walter Duncan (1848–1932): Fanciulla nel bosco (1898) and Venditrice di fiori a St. Martin in the Fields (1919)
- Gaetano Gigante (1770–1840): Assunzione della Vergine (1815)
- Vincenzo Irolli (1860–1949): La guardianella (1930)
- Salvatore Petruolo (1857–1946): Paesaggio innevato (1874)
- Oscar Ricciardi (1864–1935): Costiera Amalfitana (1893)
- Raffaele Tafuri (1857–1929): Angolo di Pedavena (1910) and Tetti (1920)
- Vincenzo Volpe (1855–1929): Donna con chitarra (1895)

=== Twentieth century ===
- Francesco Cangiullo (1884–1966): In città (1953)
- Carlo Carrà (1881–1966): Onde (1924) and Bagnate (1924)
- Giorgio de Chirico (1888–1978): I fuochi sacri (1929), Gli archeologi (1969), and I mobili nella valle (1971)
- Pietro D'Achiardi (1879–1940): Paesaggio di Lorenzana con calesse (1937)
- Pierre Laprade (1875–1931): Amour et Psyché (1925)
- Atanasio Soldati (1896–1953): Composizione (1949)
- Ugo Attardi (1926–2006): Il viaggio di Ulisse (1990–2000)
- Antonio Corpora (1909–2004): Il cielo sugli alberi (1994)
- Salvatore Fiume (1915–1997): Natività (1995)
- Emilio Greco (1913–1995): Aretusa (1989)
- Renato Guttuso (1911–1987): Natura Morta (1981)
- Michelangelo Pistoletto (born 1933): Frattale bianco 4155372973840013258495611017395261542 (1999–2000)
- Ernesto Treccani (1920–2009): Maternità (1980–1990)
- Ezelino Briante (1901–1971): Porto di Torre del Greco (1965)
- Remo Brindisi (1918–1996): Guerriero (1979)
- Tonino Caputo (born 1933): Il cortile (1987)
- Lucio Cargnel (1903–1998): Paesaggio di periferia (1963)
- Mario Ceroli (born 1938): Icosaedro (1980–1999)
- Nino D'Amore (born 1949): Piano di Sorrento (2014)
- Gianni Dova (1925–1991): Uccello di Bretagna (1990)
- Carmelo Fodaro (born 1936): Natura morta (1970–1989)
- Felicita Frai (1909–2010): Fiori modesti (1989)
- Giovan Francesco Gonzaga (1921–2007): I due corsieri (1995) and Paesaggio Bergamasco (2000)
- Beppe Guzzi (1902–1982): Ville (1970)
- Bruno Landi (born 1941): Paesaggio (1987)
- Renzo Vespignani (1924–2002): Marta (1982)

=== Twenty-first century ===
- Giancarlo Angeloni (born 1966): Positano chiesa madre (2013)
- Maurizio Delvecchio (born 1962): Il tramonto e l'attesa (2013)
- Athos Faccincani (born 1951): Girasoli (2001)
- Alfonso Fratteggiani Bianchi (born 1952): Colore Blu 23050 (2014)
- Rabarama (born 1969): Palpit-azione (2010)
- Paola Romano (born 1951): Luna sospesa bianca (2011)

== Sources and bibliography ==
- "Mdao museo d'arte". Tra arte e scienza. I musei privati di Avellino (in Italian). Avellino: ACO associazione culturale. 2012. pp. 6–7.
- "Museo d'arte Mdao". Musei Avellino 2007 (in Italian). Avellino: ACO associazione culturale. 2007. p. 4.
- Campitelli, F. (2014). MdAO Museo d'Arte (in Italian). Avellino: MdAO. p. 4.
