= Raffaele Tafuri =

Italian painter (1857–1929)

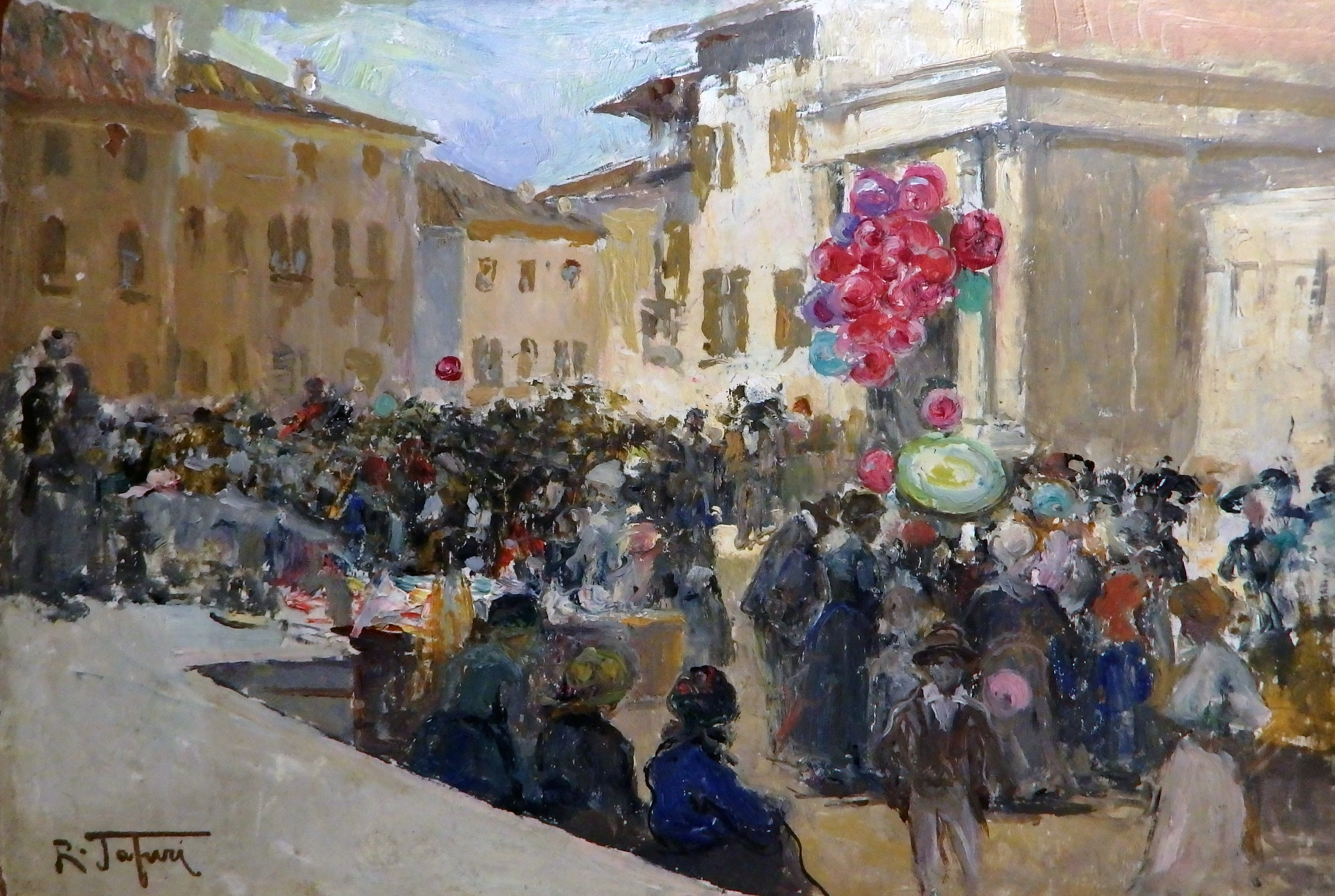
Fira a Feltre. Painting by Raffaele Tafuri

Raffaele Tafuri (January 27, 1857, in Salerno – 1929, in Venice) was an Italian painter. He completed his early studies in the family, then moved to Naples at the Institute of Fine Arts, in the city of Naples attended the study of sculptor Stanislao Lista. He is famous for his coastal landscapes.

He participated in the first Biennale of Art in Venice in 1895 and in the editions of 1907, 1909, 1910, 1914.

== Works in museums ==
- Collezione d'arte della SBAPPSAE of Salerno (Italy) with on deposit: Caffè Florian di Venezia (1910).
- Museo d'arte of Avellino (Italy) with Scorcio Lacustre (1898), Campanile (1900), Baite (1905), Angolo di Pedavena (1910) e Tetti (1929).
- Museo nazionale della scienza e della tecnologia Leonardo da Vinci of Milan (Italy) Section Art Collection, with Ragazze al sole (1887).
- Pinacoteca Provinciale of Salerno (Italy) with: Le spannocchiatrici and Masaniello.

== Bibliography ==
- (IT) BONATTI Cecilia (1975), “Raffaele Tafuri”, in MONTEVERDI Mario Storia della pittura italiana dell'Ottocento, Bramante Editrice, Milan 1975, vol.3, pag. 282.
- (IT) MARINI Giuseppe Luigi (1994), “Raffaele Tafuri”, in IDEM Il valore dei dipinti italiani dell'Ottocento e del primo novecento, edizione XI (1993/1994), Umberto Allemandi & C., Turin 1994, pag. 452.
- (IT) MARINI Giuseppe Luigi (2002), “Raffaele Tafuri”, in IDEM Il valore dei dipinti italiani dell'Ottocento e del primo novecento, edizione XIX (2001/2002), Umberto Allemandi & C., Turin 2002, pag. 736.
- (IT) ORGA Stefano (2017),Raffaele Tafuri (1857-1929). Il grande pittore salernitano dell'Ottocento, Omicron, Naples 2017, pp. 88. SBN:IT\ICCU\NAP\0794626.
- (IT) ORGA Stefano (2019),Raffaele Tafuri protagonista della pittura italianatra Ottocento e Novecento, Omicron, Naples 2019, pp. 26. SBN:IT\ICCU\CAM\0233388.
