= Achille Petrocelli =

Italian painter

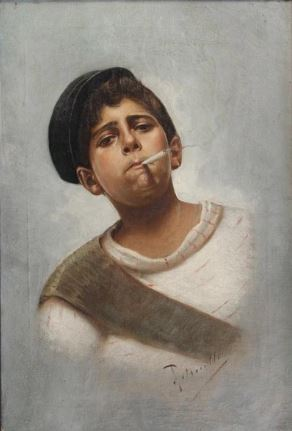
A Boy Smoking a Cigarette

Achille Petrocelli (18 August 1861 – 1929) was an Italian painter, best-known for genre scenes and portraits of ordinary people.

He was born in Naples. His father, Vincenzo, and older brother, Arturo, were both painters. He first studied under his father, then attended the Academy of Fine Arts in Naples, where he was mentored by Gabriele Smargiassi and Achille Carrillo. Initially, he focused on landscapes and won a prize for one in an exhibition at the Academy.

Among his works are: Tell Me Yes (a large canvas with figures painted from life, exhibited in Rome); Everything for the Children (a Neapolitan genre scene, exhibited at the "Society for the Promotion of the Fine Arts" of Naples); The Resting Workers; and The Odalisques (an Orientalist scene). He would become a regular exhibitor at the Society, from 1879 to 1896. The Province of Naples purchased his work The Wandering Jew in 1881.

Petrocelli died in 1929 in Naples.
