= Arturo Petrocelli =

Italian painter

Arturo Petrocelli (1856 – after 1916) was an Italian painter, mainly of genre works.

He was born in Naples. He was the son of painter Vincenzo, and older brother of Achille Petrocelli. He first studied under his father. Among his major works are: La colomba insidiata nel nido, Un bacio furtivo; Selvaggina; and Il giuoco delle Nocciuole (Neapolitan Costume scene, displayed at the Promotrice). He completed many still lifes and costume dramatizations, painting in pastel and water-colors.
