= Salvatore Petruolo =

Italian painter (1857–1946)

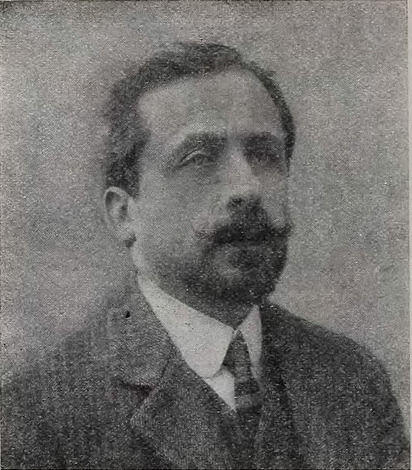
Petruolo in 1916

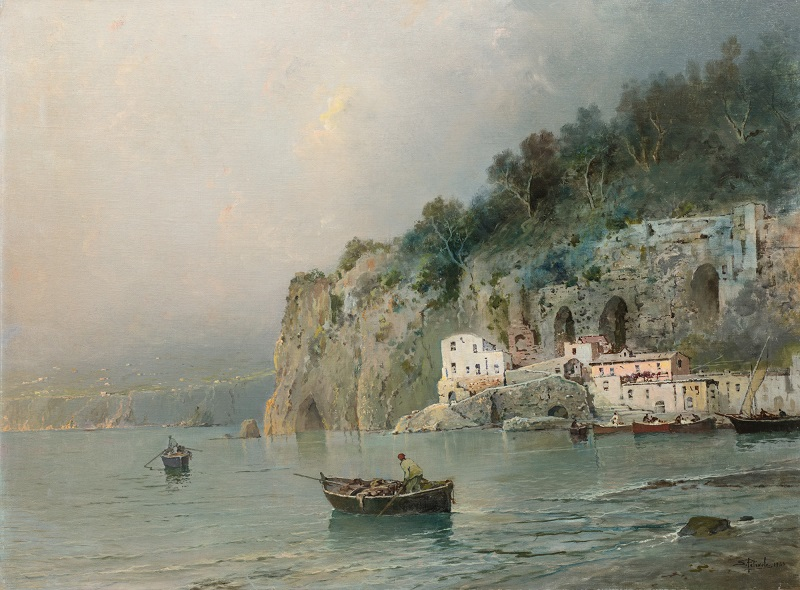
The Amalfi Coast

Salvatore Petruolo (4 January 1857 – 1946) was an Italian painter.

== Life and career ==
Petruolo was born on 4 January 1857 in Catanzaro. He was a pupil of Gabriele Smargiassi at the Institute of Fine Arts in Naples. He is famous for his coastal landscapes, near Naples and very rare landscapes of Calabria. His landscapes from 1875 to 1898 show the style of the School of Posillipo with influences of Edoardo Dalbono. After 1898 his painting style became more personal and distinctive, with a symbolist influence.

He was popular with English and American visitors to Naples. His studio was visited by people including Empress Frederick, the Duke and Duchess of Edinburgh, the Prince of Battenberg, Princess Louise, sister of King Edward of England. In 1889 he stayed with Duke and Duchess of Edinburgh at Malta for three months. He went on a painting trip to Spain visiting Granada, Seville, Córdoba and Zaragoza. He showed the works from this trip in an exhibition at Clarence House in London.

He died in 1946 in Naples.

== Works in museums ==
- Museo d'arte of Avellino (Italy) with Paesaggio innevato (1874)
- Museo Nazionale di Capodimonte of Naples (Italy) with Marina di Sorrento (1884).
- Pinacoteca "Enrico Giannelli" of Parabita (LE) (Italy).
- Pinacoteca Civica "Giuseppe De Nittis" of Barletta (Italy) with Pini (1908).
