= Former Church of Santa Lucia (Gaeta) =

Former church in Gaeta, Italy

Santa Lucia Auditorium (Former Church of Santa Lucia)
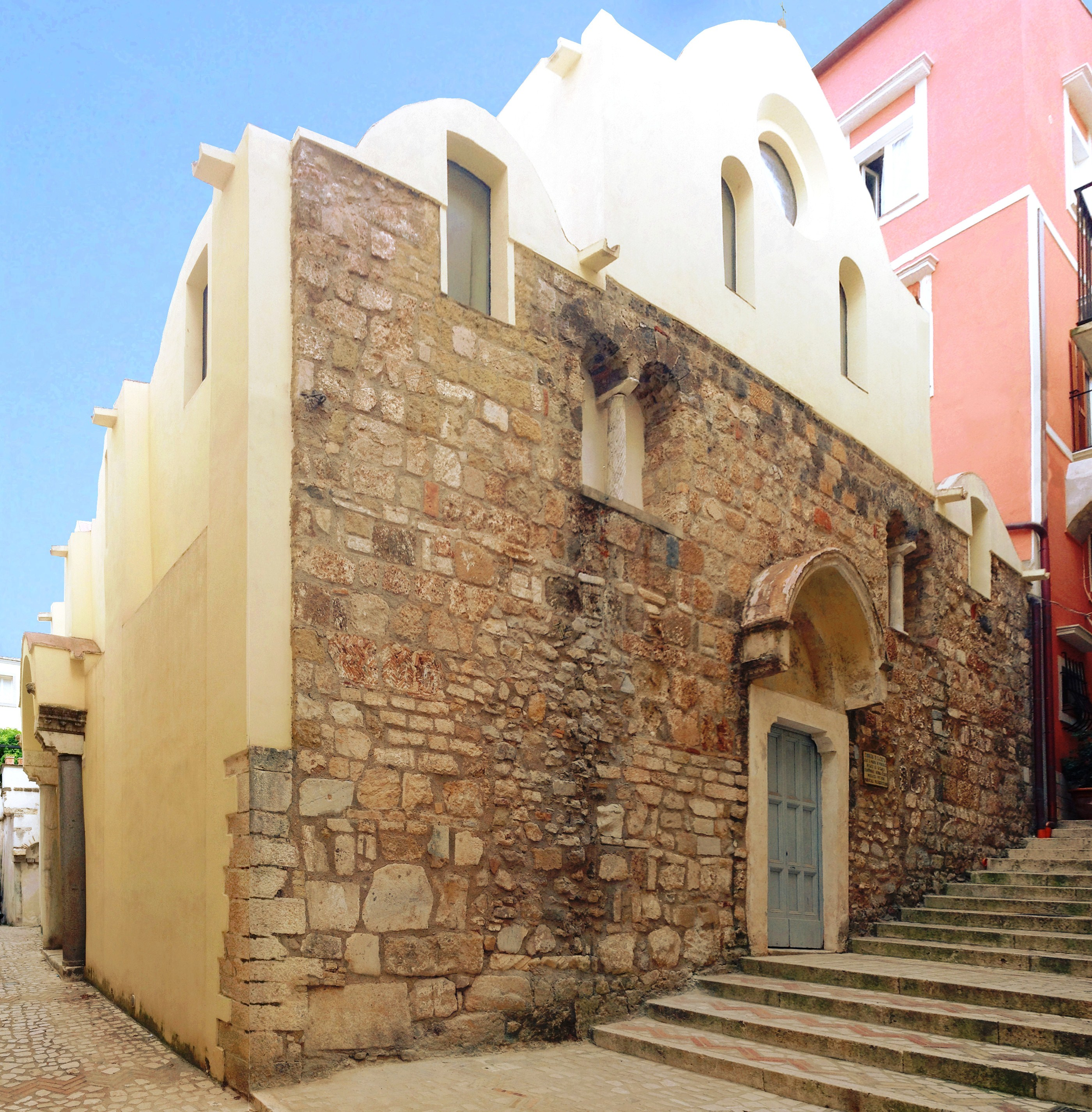
- Exterior

- 41°12′30.1″N 13°35′19.61″E
- Location: Gaeta, Lazio, Italy
- Address: Via Ladislao, 27
- Denomination: Catholic
- Website: https://scuoladimusicagaeta.com

History
- Dedication: Saint Lucy
- Consecrated: May 8, 1765

Architecture
- Style: Romanesque
- Groundbreaking: 11th century
- Completed: 13th century

The Santa Lucia Auditorium is a concert hall set up in the deconsecrated church of the same name, formerly Santa Maria in Pensulis, located in the historic center of Gaeta, in the province of Latina, on Via Ladislao, 27.

It is the oldest church in the city, being the result of the 11th-century expansion of a pre-existing early medieval place of worship; closed to worship in 1966, it was deconsecrated in 1972 and is owned by the municipality of Gaeta. The building is, together with the church of San Giovanni a Mare, an example of Gaeta's Romanesque architecture, characterized by early Christian and Byzantine influences.

== History ==
=== The early medieval church ===
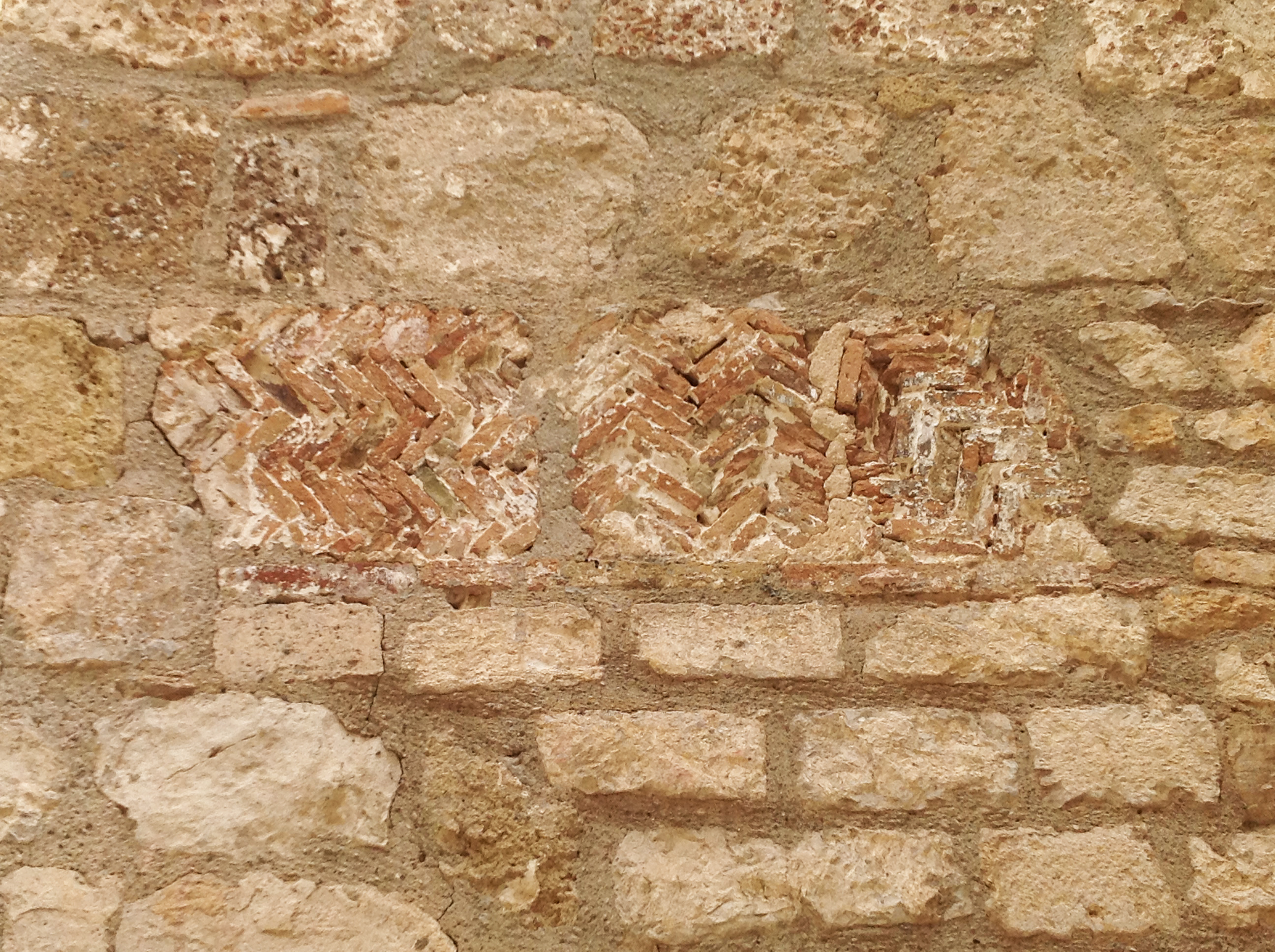
Opus spicatum inlays in the facade of the present building, originally the right wall of the early medieval church.

A primitive place of worship was built on the site of the present building between the 8th and 9th centuries. It was located in the built-up area of the city, had an orthogonal orientation compared to the present one, with the entrance on the ancient decumanus (today's Ladislaus Street); its length (12 m) was equal to the width of the present hall, and its width (about 6 m) corresponded to the first two bays of the present one. The church had a single nave, in the back wall of which was a small semicircular apse partly excavated in the rock. The interior was probably covered with a wooden truss ceiling and was illuminated by two mullioned windows that were located in the right wall and can still be seen, plugged, on the facade of the church (which has, in the lower part, a different wall face than the rest of the building, with inlays in opus spicatum, the arrangement of which, however, would not be the original one) and by two single-arched lancet windows that are also currently walled in and visible inside the building, in the first two bays of the left aisle above the ancient entrance door.

The early medieval church was probably dedicated to the Salvator Mundi (not to be confused with the church of the same name in Caetani alley, currently reduced to a state of ruins) and it would be the same building mentioned under that title in the Codex diplomaticus cajetanus in 887 along the platea maior (which can be identified as present-day Ladislaus Street), a document in which it is stated that the priest Mellitus, operating in San Salvatore, received in emphyteusis a warehouse with workshops located in the city from Count Giovanni, son of Ramfo. The same writing also mentions the nearby church of St. Benedict, which then, by 1024, would acquire its title. The indication given by Salvatore Ferraro of St. Lucy as dedicatee of the original building from a 976 document of the Codex diplomaticus cajetanus within which, in a dispute concerning the goods of the church of St. Nicholas on the island of Zannone, reference is made to a Giorgio, archpriest of the church of Santa Lucia Martire, would be erroneous in that it would refer not to the building in Gaeta but to the demolished church and deaconry of Santa Lucia in Septizodium in Rome. In a report compiled in 1591 by Bishop Alfonso Laso Sedeño for the Royal Chamber of the Sommaria, the parish of the same name is described as one of the absolute oldest in the city, along with those of St. Peter, St. Thomas and St. George, which is why the parish priest was entitled to wear the mitre, a tradition that fell into disuse in the 19th century. The Duke of Gaeta John III promoted restorations to the church.

=== Late medieval reconstruction ===
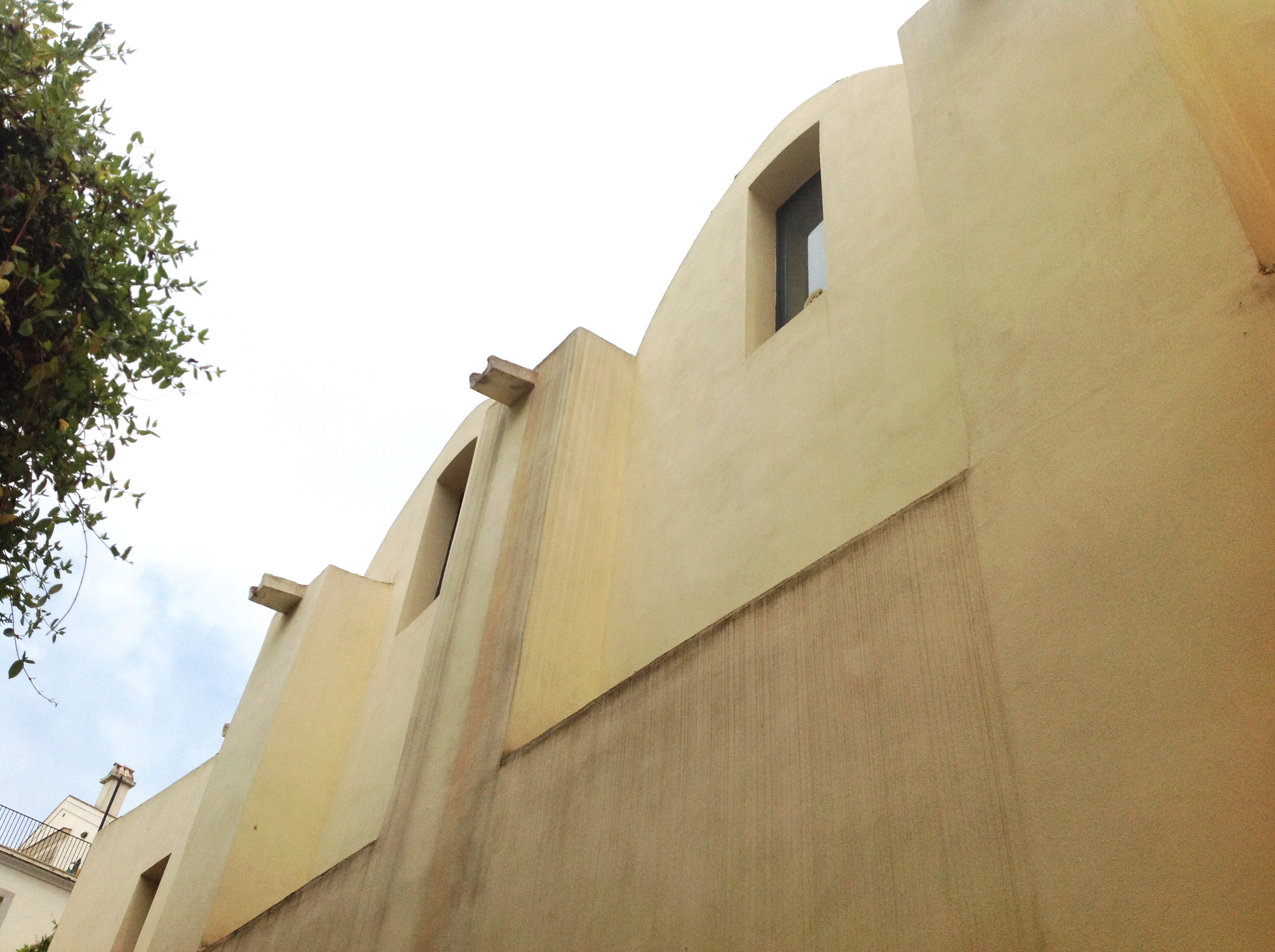
Glimpse of the left flank, with the extrados cross vaults and buttresses from the 13th century.

In the 11th century the church was rebuilt taking as a model the abbey basilica of Montecassino, rebuilt by Abbot Desiderius starting in 1066 and consecrated in 1071. The axis was rotated by 90°, so that the ancient facade was incorporated into the left side wall; the environment assumed a basilical plan of early Christian derivation, with three naves separated by arches resting on bare columns and covered with a truss ceiling. The Gaetan church, in its new layout, differed from the Desiderian basilica in the absence of a transept, and had an appearance similar to that of the basilica of Sant'Angelo in Formis, near Capua, or the church of Santa Maria in Foro Claudio, in Ventaroli (Carinola). As part of the same intervention, a bell tower with a quadrangular base was also built.

Beginning with the reconstruction of the 11th century, the church assumed the titling of Santa Maria in Pensulis (due to the frequent presence in the area of hanging gardens), first witnessed in a 1218 document relating to the donation to the monastery of Sant'Erasmo in Formia of a dwelling located near the church, and also present in the deed of foundation of the Sanctuary of the Santissima Annunziata (1322); it was maintained until the entire seventeenth century, as evidenced by two tombstones present inside the church and respectively dated 1480 and 1681, before being replaced by the current one, which had been in place alongside the previous one since at least the second half of the fifteenth century, being mentioned for the first time in the 1459 census.

The church underwent restoration in the 13th century, probably following the earthquake of June 1, 1213, which had its epicenter under the Aurunci Mountains and caused extensive damage in the surrounding area, within which the city of Gaeta was situated. At that juncture, the original wooden-beam roofing was replaced, in all three naves, with rib vaults; for this reason it was necessary to reinforce the walls by providing them with buttresses (in the left side aisle) and increasing their thickness (in the central aisle). Throughout the Middle Ages, from the 8th-9th centuries until the 15th, the interior of the church was enriched with frescoes, in some cases even covering the older ones.

During the stay in Gaeta of Ladislaus of Durazzo, king of Naples, and his wife Costanza Chiaramonte, who stayed together with the court in the city from 1387 to 1399, the church of Santa Maria in Pensulis performed the function of palatine chapel because of its proximity to the palace where the sovereign resided.

=== The Renaissance and Baroque interventions ===
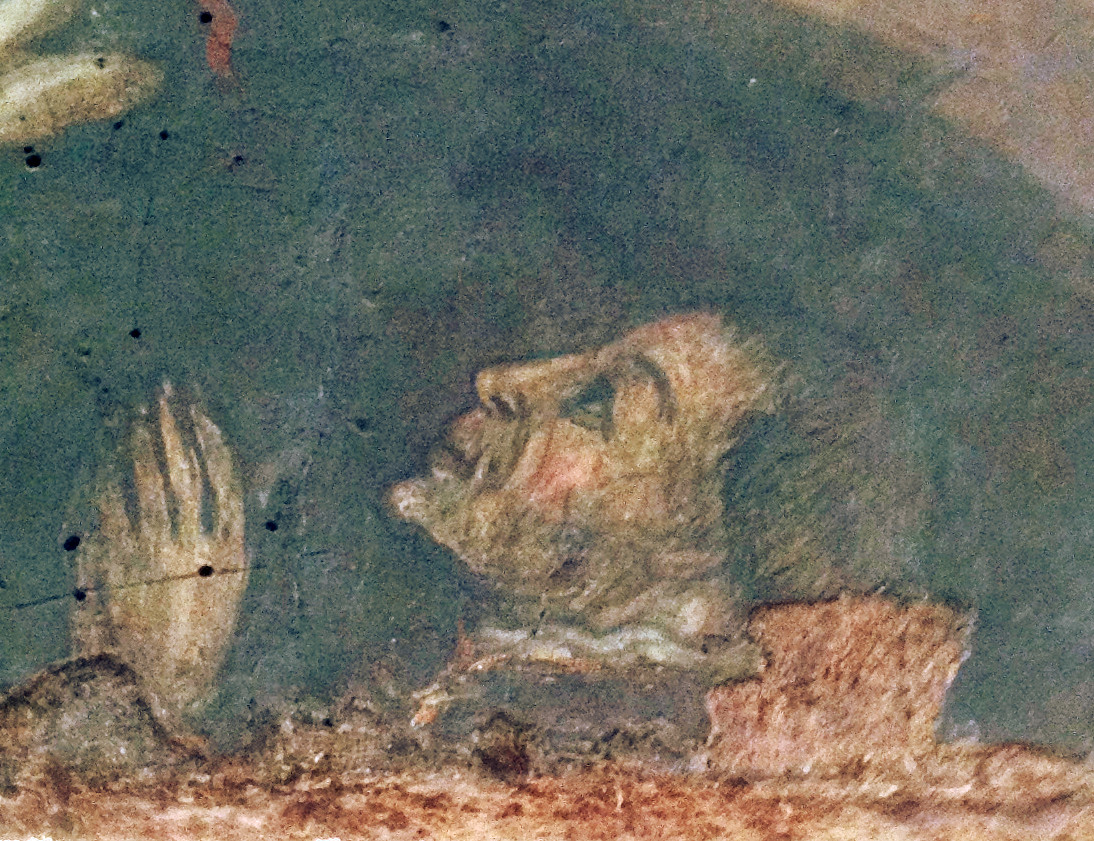
Giuliano D'Orca, parish priest of Santa Maria in Pensulis until 1480, portrayed as patron at the base of Giovanni da Gaeta's Crucifix.

During the following centuries the church did not undergo substantial changes, which allowed it to maintain its medieval structure almost unchanged: the interventions conducted were aimed at enriching the interior of the building with decorative elements in Renaissance and Baroque style.

In 1456 the parish priest Giuliano D'Orca commissioned a triptych depicting the Coronation of the Virgin, to be placed above the high altar, from the painter Giovanni da Gaeta, who later also painted a Crucifix for the church. During the 15th century a number of side altars were built along the minor aisles.

In 1646 at the behest of the parish priest Giambattista D'Aino (or Daino) Della Croce, the church underwent a major restoration in a Baroque style: the interior was enriched with sober stucco and scagliola decorations placed to adorn the underlying medieval structures, assuming an appearance somewhat similar to that of the present collegiate church of San Pietro in Minturno. Four new altars were built in place of the previous one, dedicated to St. Joseph, St. Philip Neri, the Crucifix and St. Lucy, respectively. The high altar was incorporated within a gilded wooden retable placed immediately in front of the apsidal arch: the two side sections consisted of as many arched niches richly decorated with bas-reliefs and containing the statues of St. Peter (left) and St. Paul (right), respectively, while the central one was formed by Giovanni da Gaeta's triptych inserted within a cornice; the latter, attributable to the carving circle of Giovanni Francesco Mormando and consisting of a tall entablature with a bas-relief frieze, supported by two twisted fluted Corinthian columns and surmounted by the statues of St. Erasmus (left), St. Marcian (right) and St. Michael the Archangel (center), was probably the front part of the pipe organ built in the 16th century for the Gaeta Cathedral; in the fields left empty at the top by the triptych were painted the Evangelists. Above the retable, completely occluding the apse, was a rich stucco decoration depicting a velarium held open by two angels, which departed from a wooden crown of considerable size.

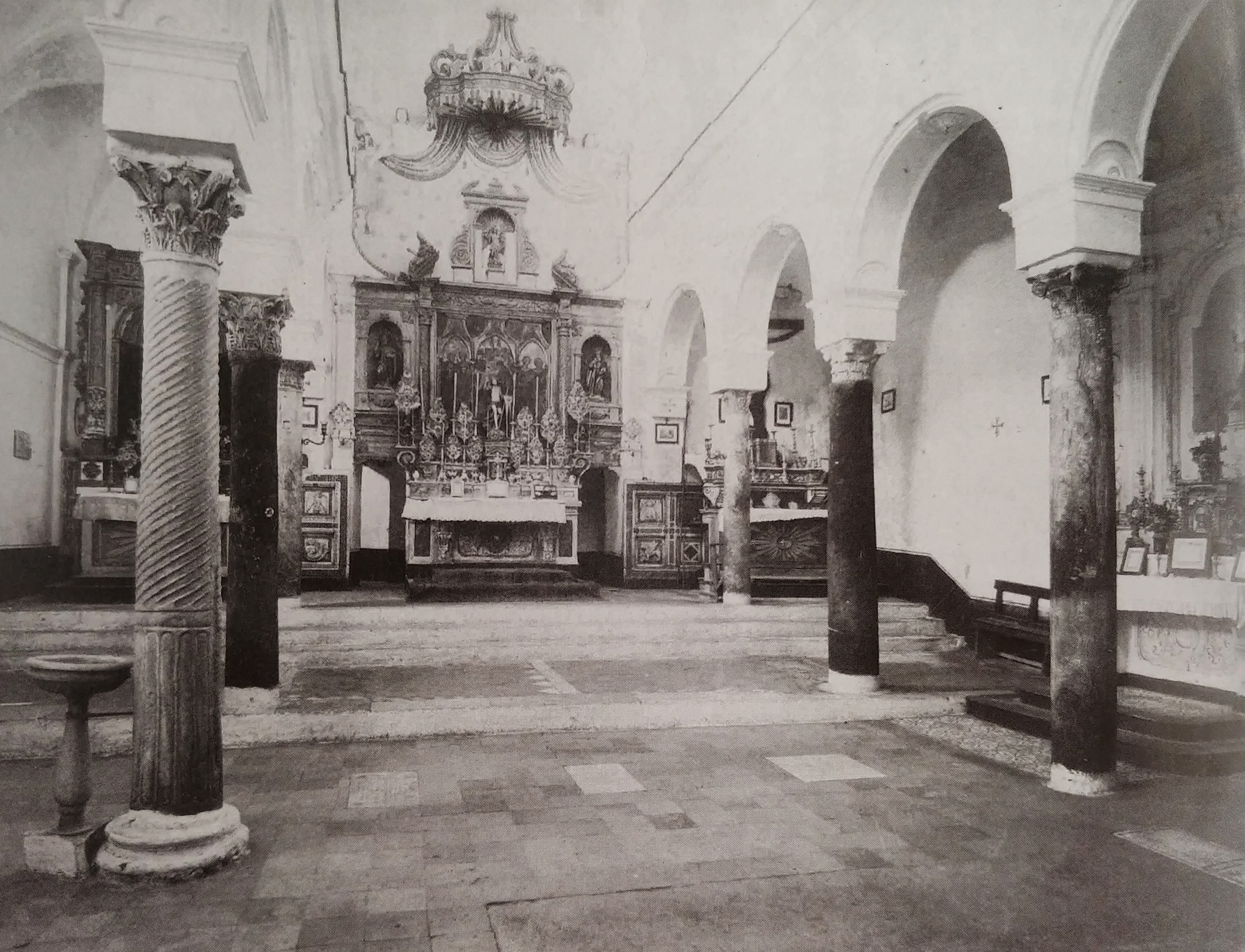
Interior of the church with its Baroque appearance in a photograph by Romualdo Moscioni from 1892-1895.

In 1654 the church, in addition to being a parish church, became the seat of a chaplaincy, founded by the parish priest D'Aino and entrusted to the priest Francesco Varlone; there was also a confraternity dedicated to St. Philip Neri, which met at the altar of the same name, witnessed in 1751 and no longer present in the second half of the following century. New restorations were conducted at the behest of parish priest Francesco Orecchia Sales, at the end of which, on July 13, 1755, Bishop Gennaro Carmignani of Gaeta consecrated three new altars:

Erectis ex Marmore lapidibus / tres Aras consecravit / Ill(ustrissimus) e(t) R(everendissimus) D(ominus) Ian(uarius) Carmignani / Ep(iscopus) Caietanus / A(nno) D(omini) 1755 die XIII m(ense) Iuli
Templum hoc Prior Curatus / Fran(ciscus) Orecchia Sales / Ornavit eodem anno
Having made the marble altars, the most illustrious and reverend lord Gennaro Carmignani, bishop of Gaeta, consecrated three altars on the 13th day of July in the year 1755.
This temple was restored the same year by prior curate Francesco Orecchia Sales.

—Tombstone to the right of the apse

On May 8, 1765, the same bishop proceeded with the dedication of the church:

Templum hoc Ill(ustrissimus) e(t) R(everendissimus)/ D(omi)nus Ianuarius / Carmignani Ep(iscop)us Caiet(a)e / consecravit Die 8 Mai(i) / 1765
The most illustrious and reverend lord Gennaro Carmignani, bishop of Gaeta, consecrated this temple on May 8, 1765.

—Tombstone to the left of the apse

During the 19th century the church, which was too small to be readapted for military purposes, continued to be the site of a parish and to be regularly officiated, although it was in a precarious state that would be repeatedly recorded until the intervention of the 1930s. In 1852, Giacomo Guarinelli, a major and commander of the Engineers, as well as an architect who was also active in Gaeta at that time for the neo-Gothic expansion and rebuilding of the temple of St. Francis, was commissioned to restore some of the city's churches including that of Santa Lucia, where he particularly wanted to recover the cosmatesque fragments of the floor and the bas-reliefs then considered part of the cathedral's ancient and lost ambon; the work never took place. Onorato Gaetani dell'Aquila d'Aragona, mayor of Gaeta in 1870-1876, wanted to transfer the parish to the nearby church of Saint Catherine of Alexandria during his term in office in order to turn the once-deconsecrated church of Santa Lucia into a museum of art and local history.

=== The restorations of the 20th and 21st centuries ===
==== The restoration of 1934-1937 ====
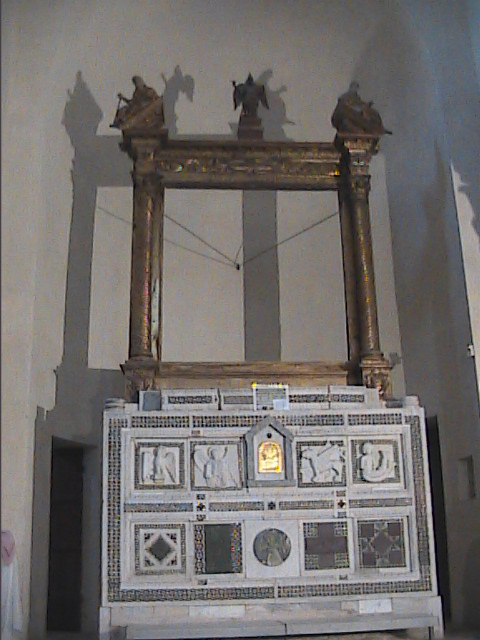
The former high altar in 2007, composed during the 1934-1937 restorations, devoid of the mensa and its supporting columns, which were removed in the 1980s.

Between 1934 and 1937, the church underwent a radical restoration conducted by Gino Chierici at the behest of historian and Minister of Education Pietro Fedele (originally from Minturno) and Archbishop Dionigi Casaroli of Gaeta.

The structure was consolidated and all the Baroque decorations removed, and the church was reduced to an extreme bareness; all the altars (including the high altar made of scagliola) were also demolished, except for the marble altar placed at the apse of the early medieval church. The new high altar was made by reusing as a mensa the tomb slab of Bishop Carlo Pignatelli (who died and was buried in the church of Santa Lucia in 1730) placed on two small columns, and by assembling together the remains of two ancient plutei, previously walled in at the sides of the apse; the artifact consisted of cosmatesque mosaic elements and, at the sides of the tabernacle, four 13th-century bas-reliefs depicting (from left to right): the Eagle, the Angel, a Griffin and a two-tailed Mermaid. The wooden Renaissance retable was dismembered, retaining only the 1456 triptych by Giovanni di Gaeta and the frame within which it had been inserted at a later date; the triptych by Giovanni da Gaeta was removed and underwent restoration in 1956, to be then displayed, together with the painted Crucifix by the same author, at the Diocesan Museum; above the altar remained the frame, empty.

The flooring was also redone, bringing it to an intermediate height between the hitherto existing one and the original one, removing some of the tombstones that were part of it by repositioning them along the walls of the church, and restoring fragments of cosmatesque floor mosaics, which were concentrated in the presbytery area. At the same elevation of the latter (raised a few steps above the rest of the church), the floor of the last bay of both minor aisles was also brought. On the façade, the most recent layers of plaster were removed to expose the ancient wall face and the windows of the upper part of the elevation were reopened, as well as the plugged mullioned windows were made visible again.

The church was damaged by bombing on the night of September 8–9, 1943, which is why it was necessary to restore its roofing, which was carried out in 1945.

==== Restorations in the second half of the 20th century ====
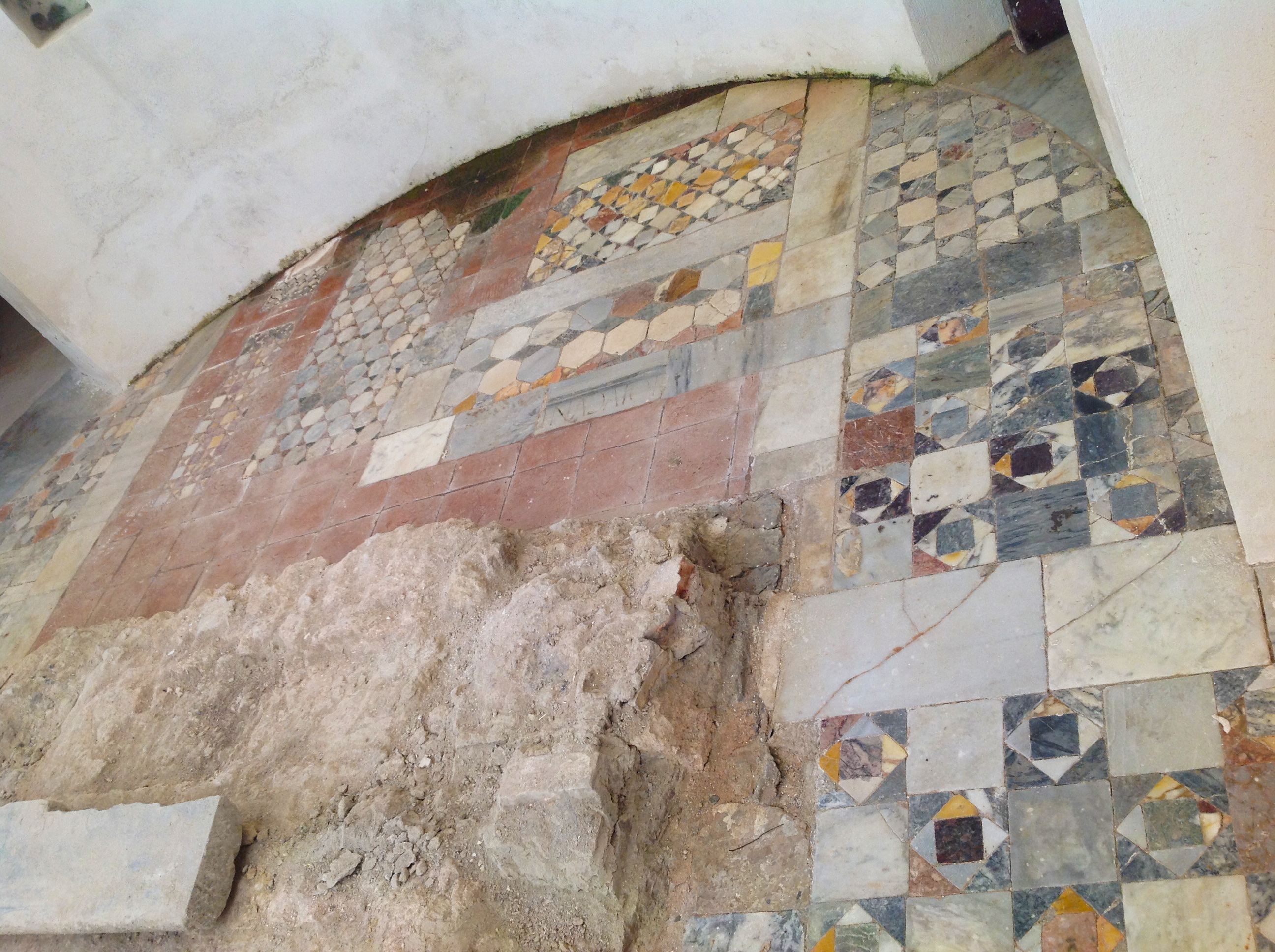
The floor of the apse, made during the 1983-1989 restorations by juxtaposing fragments of cosmatesque pavement.

The church remained regularly officiated until 1966, when it was closed for worship and then deconsecrated in 1972; the worship of St. Lucy and the parish were initially transferred to the nearby church of St. Catherine of Alexandria until the latter's closure in 1987 as well.

In 1974 major restoration work began, promoted by the Superintendence, which involved the entire building, which was in very poor structural condition, and lasted for fifteen years articulated in two distinct phases: the first (1974-1975) concerned the exterior, while the second (1983-1989) the interior. The plaster was redone both inside and outside (corroded by moisture) and the best-preserved fresco paintings were detached, which were exhibited at the Historic Cultural Center's picture gallery. After the flooring was completely removed, archaeological investigations were conducted in the course of which the ancient floor level came to light; underneath it, the left side wall of the early medieval church (demolished in the 11th century to allow for the expansion of the building and parallel to the present façade) and numerous burials, both in the area of the early church and under the 12th-century nave, were discovered. A new floor was then put in place, recovering the original difference in height between the floor level of the last bay of the aisles and that of the presbytery, bringing to light the ancient steps of access to the latter, and recomposing in the apsidal and presbytery areas the fragments of cosmatesque flooring. The side altar located near the early medieval apse and the high altar mensa with its supporting columns were removed, as well as all the neo-medieval-style additions made by Gino Chierici, including the twentieth-century baptismal font located in the first bay of the left aisle close to the counterfacade, framed by cosmatesque mosaic fragments from the ancient plutei that were placed on the altar.

From the 1990s onwards, the former church did not have a specific and stable purpose for its use: having dropped the idea of setting up a lapidary museum inside it, it was occasionally used for cultural events and temporary exhibitions.

==== The 21st century ====
Since 2003, being owned by the municipality of Gaeta, the latter granted the possibility of using the building as an alternative venue to the council chamber for the celebration of civil marriage.

In 2006, due to persistent water infiltration inside and outside the building, the municipality of Gaeta resolved that it should again undergo a conservative restoration, aimed at making it usable and suitable for its use as a venue for cultural and artistic activities. The work began in 2010, after the surviving ancient elements of the high altar had been removed in 2009 (destined on loan for use by the cathedral, within which they were placed at the edge of the presbyteral area) and the frame of the triptych by Giovanni da Gaeta (exhibited together with the latter inside the Diocesan Museum); the intervention consisted in the remaking of plaster and roofing, and was completed in 2013.

In 2016, the municipality approved the reconversion of the building into a theater, providing for new restorations to adapt it to this destination. As part of these works, the frescoes were restored, the plasterwork renewed, and a wooden platform was built to extend the former presbytery area toward the nave. The Santa Lucia auditorium was inaugurated on December 12, 2021.

== Description ==
=== Plant ===

Present building

Early medieval front portal
Early medieval side portal
Present facade and portal
Gravestones of Giuliano D'Orca, Pietro Cannadolce and Giambattista D'Aino della Croce
Early medieval apse
Side portal
Gravestone of Caterina di Granito
Plaque commemorating the restorations of 1646
Niche of the demolished altar of St. Agnellus
Former chancel
Presbytery
Remains of the high altar
Apse
Tombstone of 1765 and tabernacle of holy oils
Tombstone from 1755
Bell tower

Frescoes

Blessing saints (in situ)
Abraham and the elect (detached)
Velarium and St. Nicholas (in situ), St. Peter and St. John the Baptist (detached)
Velarium and Madonna and Child (in situ)
Saints (in situ), Glycophilousa and saint, Holy Bishop and Annunciation (detached)
Saints (in situ)

=== Architecture ===
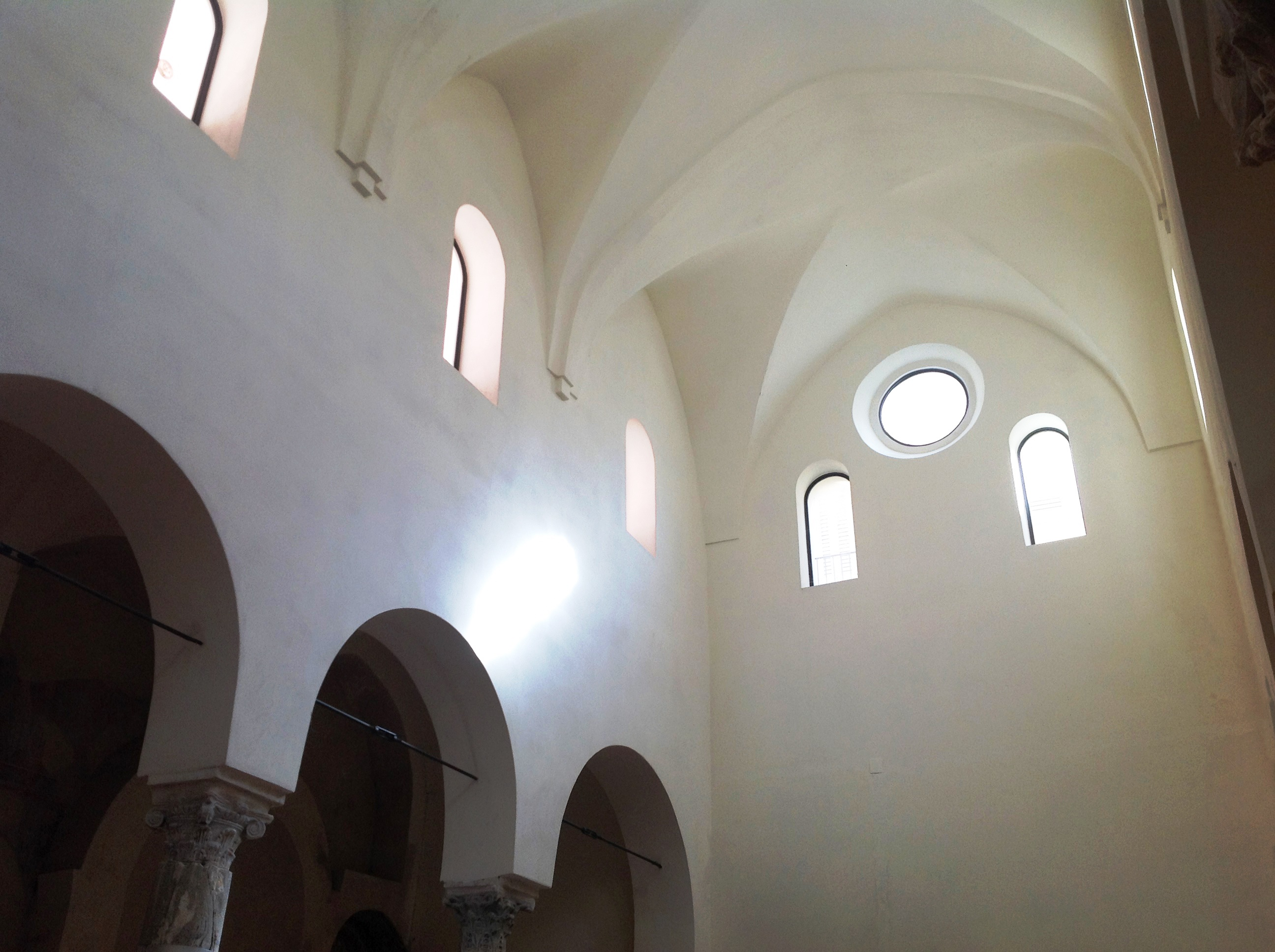
Interior of the nave toward the counter façade: note the Romanesque round arches and Gothic ogival vaults.

The former church of Santa Lucia, together with the church of San Giovanni a Mare, is one of the most representative examples of Romanesque architecture in the city of Gaeta from the 10th-12th centuries, characterized by the mixture of elements from different cultures and artistic traditions: early Christian, Byzantine and Islamic.

Of early Christian derivation is the longitudinal plan of the building, with three naves separated by columns and shallow walls to suit the original wooden truss ceiling. The basilical structure recalls, despite the absence of the transept, that of the Desiderian basilica of Montecassino (1066-1071), with a layout similar to that of the basilica of Sant'Angelo in Formis near Capua (1072-1087) and the church of San Menna at Sant'Agata de' Goti (1102-1007), although the triapsidal termination is absent in the Gaetan building, probably for reasons of space. The Byzantine element, less influential than in San Giovanni a Mare, is due to Gaeta's contacts with Amalfi (the clearest example of the affinity between Amalfi and Gaetan architecture of that period can be found in the bell tower of Gaeta cathedral, built between 1148 and 1174 and completed in 1279, which bears strong similarities to that of the cathedral of Sant'Andrea in Amalfi, begun in 1108 and finished in the second half of the 14th century): it can be seen in the tight cross-vaulted extradossed roofing of the hall, which, especially in the division into bays by transverse arches, shows influences typical of late Amalfitan Romanesque architecture, as also in the raised arches separating the naves. Related to the Islamic tradition are the use of the pointed arch in the vaults and the small dome of the bell tower, as well as the brick weaves in a decorative style visible on the exterior of the bell tower.

=== Exterior ===
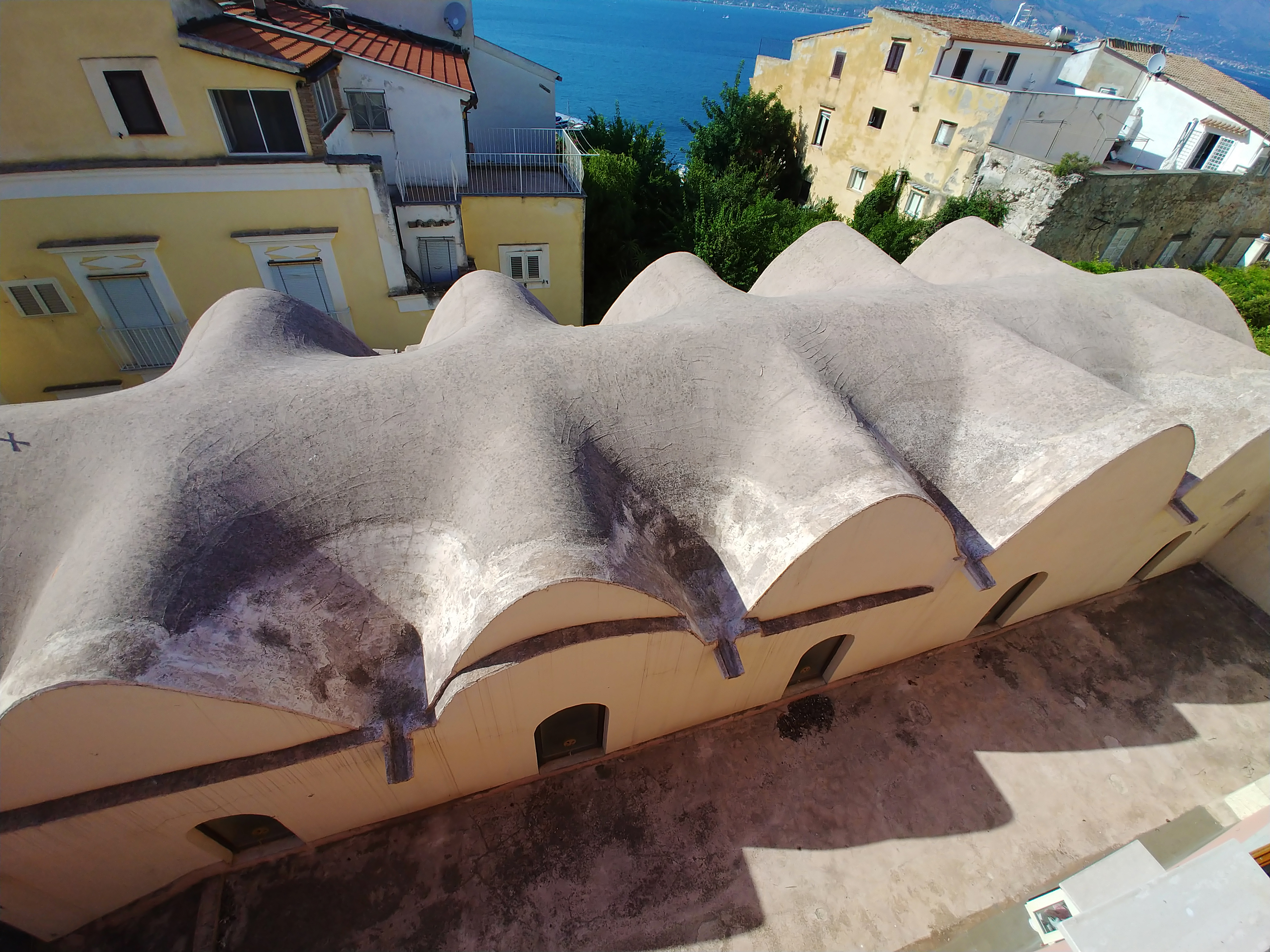
The extrados vaults of the nave.

The former church of Santa Lucia stands at the intersection of Ladislaus Street and the side street named after it, and is oriented along the northeast-southwest axis. Over the centuries, the exterior has not undergone any significant changes, except for the opening of some windows and closing of others, and is virtually unchanged according to the shape assumed following the construction of the cross vaults in the 13th century. Characteristic elements are the numerous gargoyles of simple workmanship that take place both on the façade and along the sides, and the acute extradosed vaults of the central and left aisles (the one on the right has a flat roof) made of beaten lapilli and lime milk, the latter also present in numerous almost exclusively religious buildings in the city of Gaeta such as the churches of St. Dominic, St. Thomas the Apostle and of the Nativity of Mary, the former churches of St. Benedict, St. John of the Gate and St. Mary of the Mount, the sanctuary of the Santissima Annunziata, the church of St. Angelo in Planciano and the church of St. Catherine of Alexandria (in the latter three cases, the vaults were concealed within a later superstructure, although they remained visible from above or nevertheless discernible).

==== Façade ====
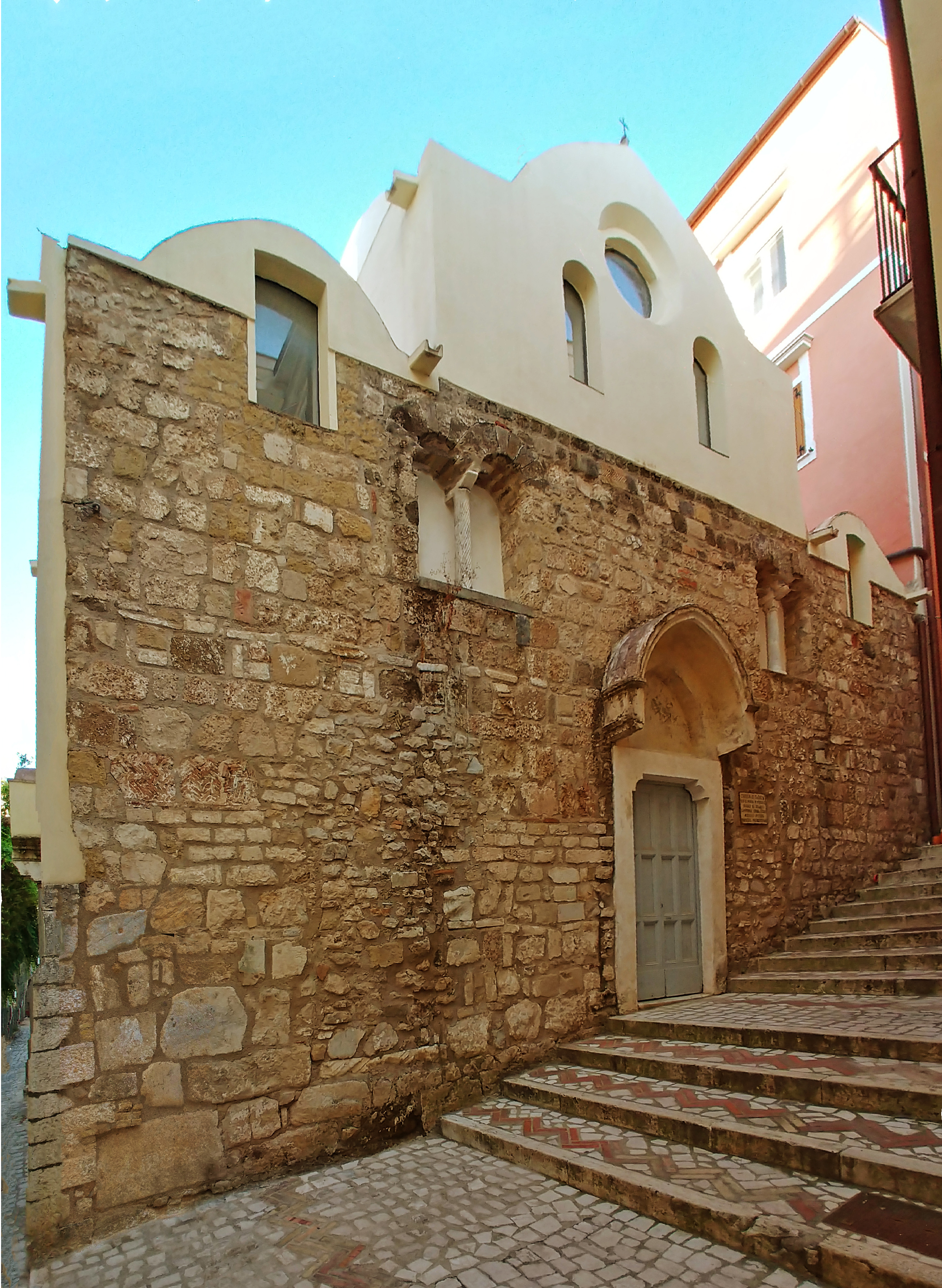
The facade.

The façade gives onto the Ladislaus side street, consisting of an upward flight of steps named after the building, and faces southwest; it is salient and allows one to discern the internal tripartition of the room into naves. The upper part of the elevation is plastered like the rest of the building, while in the lower part there is exposed masonry, which is different from the rest of the building in that it consists of the right side wall of the ancient early medieval church of the 8th-9th century; some fragments of opus spicatum (probably not in their original location and the result of reuse) and the two mullioned windows, currently walled in, that open on either side of the portal also belong to this early phase: both are supported by a simple crutch capital resting on a reclaimed column, the one on the left fluted and the one on the right plain; immediately above the latter is a cubic reclaimed capital carved in monobloc form with plant motifs, presumably from the 8th century.

In the center of the elevation, at the bottom, is the only portal, the result of 11th-century rebuilding and placed along the longitudinal axis of the church, characterized by a simple marble cornice that also adorns the architrave, which rests on two corbels of similar workmanship. It is surmounted by a little protruding ogival hanging porch and a lunette, which is hollow; the porch rests on two carved marble corbels made from ancient fragments of entablature, and has a little elaborate masonry cornice along the profile. In the upper part of the elevation, within the plastered area corresponding to the nave, there are two splayed single-lancet windows with round arches and a little higher up, in axis with the portal, there is a circular rose window, also splayed. The upper crowning of the facade at all three naves is formed by the ogival profile of the extrados cross vaults.

==== Left flank ====
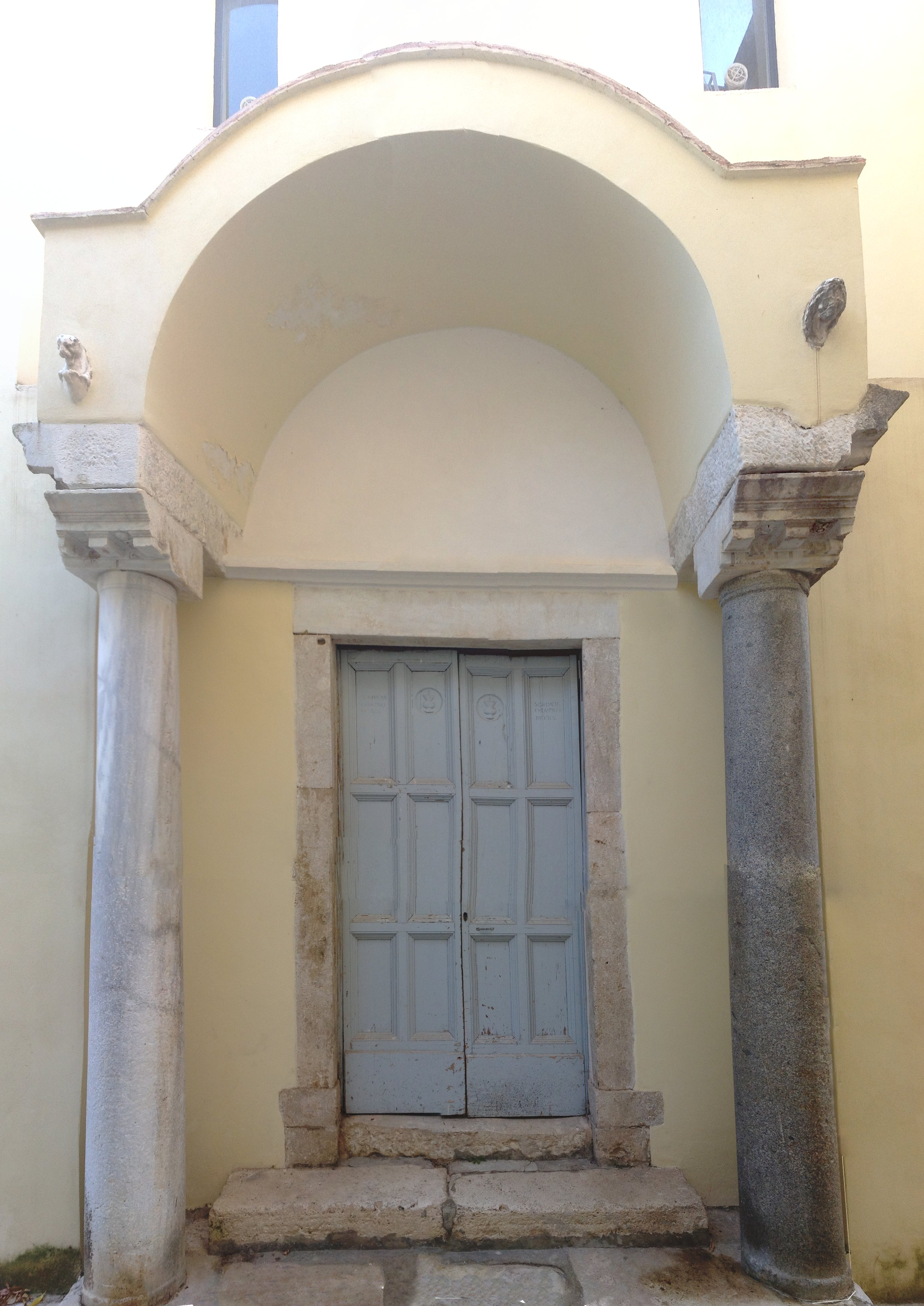
The side portal, located along the left flank.

The left flank of the church, facing Ladislaus Street, is characterized by the series of buttresses that enliven and strengthen the wall of the related side aisle, built in the 13th century to counter the thrust of the cross vaults. They follow the division into bays and protrude only from the upper part of the wall, as they are incorporated into the masonry of the lower one.

Between the second and third bays there is a side portal, also the result of the 11th-century rebuilding and sometimes mistakenly confused with the entrance to the ancient early medieval church, which was instead placed astride the present first and second bays of the same nave and is currently not visible from the outside; it is surmounted by a prothyrum, of more considerable size than the one placed above the axial portal: the structure consists of a round arch resting on two smooth reclaimed columns, at the top of each of which, as capitals, are placed at an orthogonal angle to each other two pieces of ancient marble entablature with moldings and dentils in relief, originally part of an architrave. In the masonry above each column is walled a marble sculpture depicting the head of an animal, on the right a Lion and on the left a Tiger. The door, which lacks a lunette, is rectangular in shape, with a marble frame; on the doors is engraved in Latin the double dedication of the church to the Virgin Mary (without the appellation in Pensulis) and to St. Lucy.

==== Bell tower ====
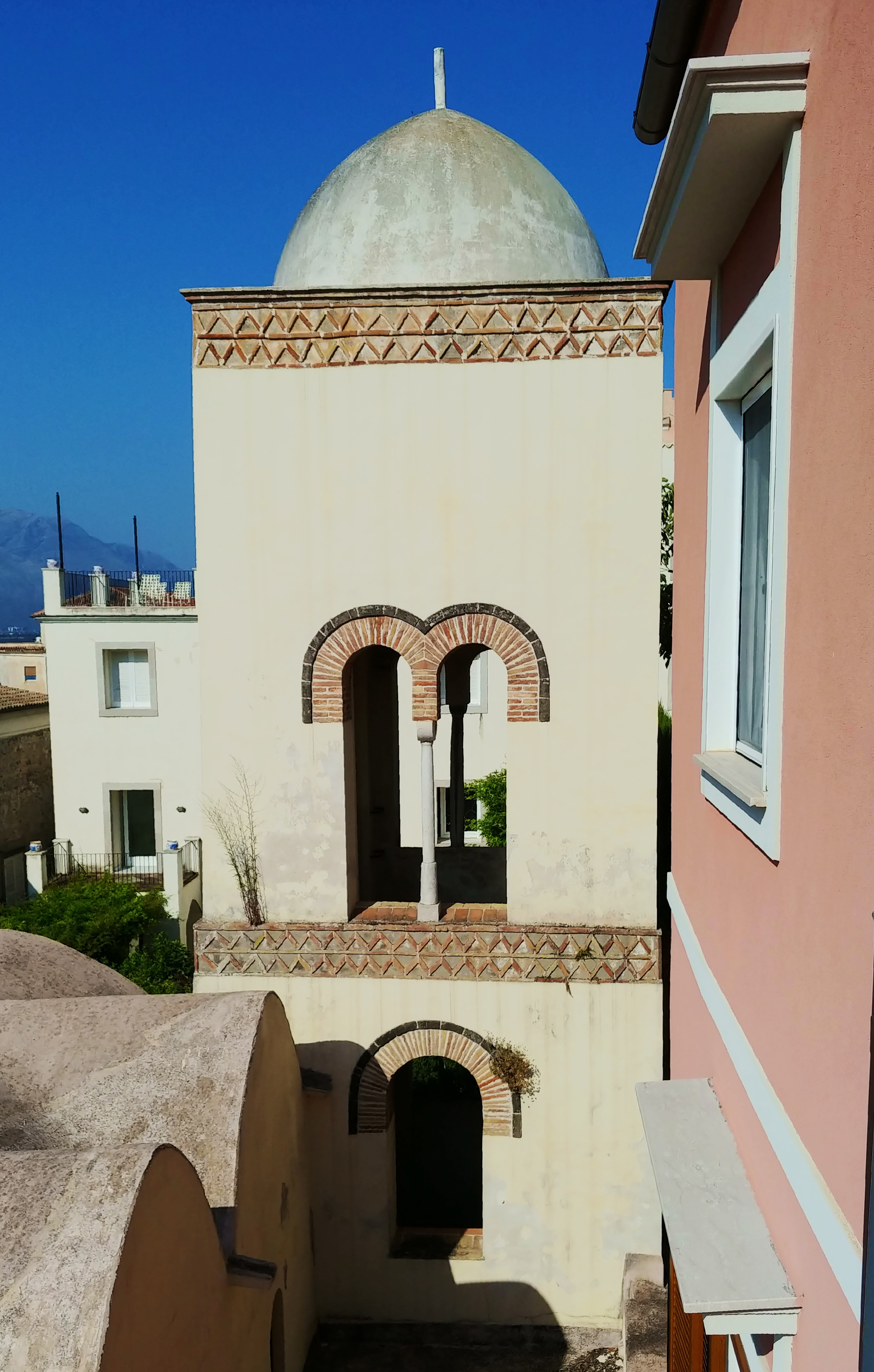
The bell tower.

The bell tower stands in the west corner of the church, between the semicircular apse and the right aisle; it has a quadrangular base, and dates from the 12th century.

On each of the four facades, the bell tower has two orders of round-headed windows, of which the upper one corresponds to the belfry (which houses a single bell): at the bottom there is a wide single lancet window on each side, while at the top there is a mullioned window supported by a marble column with a crutch capital of the same material. The arches are emphasized by an accentuated brick lintel (an element found in the city only in the bell tower of the cathedral and in the coeval bell tower of the church of San Domenico, the latter being the only surviving element of the ancient monastery of Santa Maria della Maina) with thick dark stone edging at the top. The wall face consists of light-colored plaster similarly to the rest of the church, and is characterized by a triple Islamic-derived double-banded decoration in bricks arranged symmetrically in a herringbone pattern, also present in the cathedral bell tower and in those of the churches of San Costanzo in Capri and San Giovanni del Toro in Ravello. The roof consists of a small dome with a circular base and a pointed section, probably once decorated with polychrome tiles according to Neapolitan custom, based on which that of the bell tower of the church of San Domenico was reconstructed during the 1991-1996 restorations.

=== Interior ===
The former church of Santa Lucia has a basilical plan with three naves, without a transept and with a semicircular apse at the nave. The interior is characterized by the extreme bareness to which the restorations directed by Gino Chierici in 1934-1937 led it, which eliminated all traces of decoration subsequent to the 12th-century enlargement, intending to bring the interior back to a style hypothetically close to the original one.

==== Hall ====
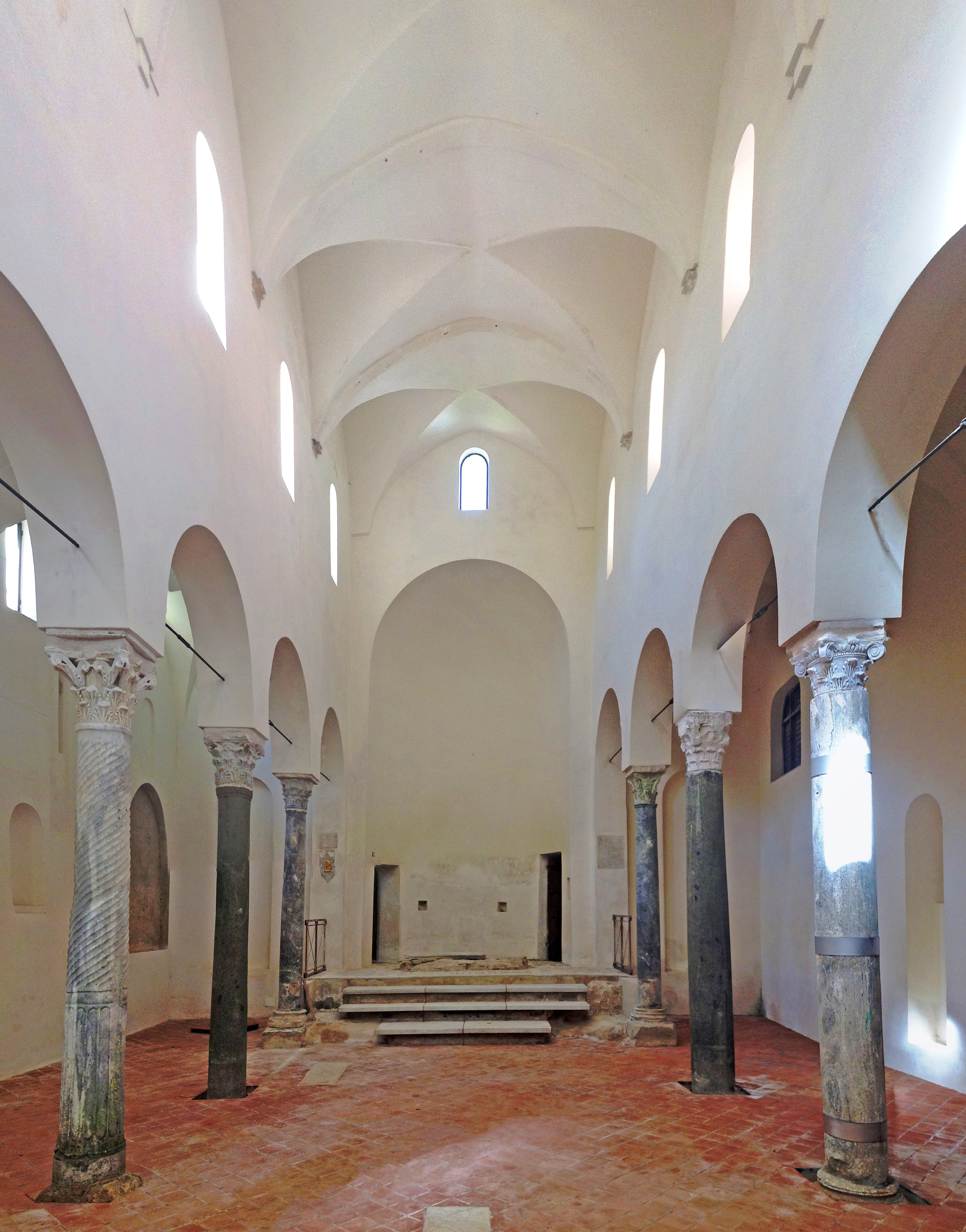
The interior.

The hall is divided into aisles by five round-arched arcades on each side, raised in accordance with Byzantine custom and resting on reclaimed columns. At each of them in the nave a single-light window with a round arch opens. Other windows, of later date and with a rectangular section, are found in the aisles along the left side and in the counterfacade. The ceiling consists of lowered ogival cross vaults from the 13th century, interspersed with thin pointed arches that emphasize the division into bays (five per nave). In the two side aisles, the base of the vault is not immediately above the columns, but is at a significantly higher elevation; moreover, close to the outer wall it does not always correspond to the axis of the respective column. The columns dividing the aisles were recovered from ancient Roman constructions and are made of different materials: marble, granite and travertine. The capitals, which are Corinthian, are also from Roman times and differ from each other although they all have an acanthus leaf decoration and, at the corners, volutes.

The flooring, which is modern, is made of terracotta; of the tomb slabs that were originally set within the floor, only that of Caterina Di Granito, wife of Gabriele De Gengulo who died in 1435, remains in its original location (placed on the left side of the fourth bay of the nave and characterized by the presence of the family coat of arms in bas-relief next to the epigraph). In the center of the flooring of the second bay of the nave is a plaque commemorating the work conducted inside the church in 1646 at the behest of parish priest Giambattista D'Aino (or Daino) Della Croce. The other tombstones were removed during the restorations of the second quarter of the 20th century and set aside along the side walls of the church; in the right aisle, on the counterfacade, the tombstones of parish priests Giuliano D'Orca (from 1480, on the right) and D'Aino (died 1681, on the left), and that of knight Pietro Cannadolce (from the 14th century, in the center) were walled in at the same juncture, bearing the effigy of the respective deceased, the first two in relief, the third engraved.

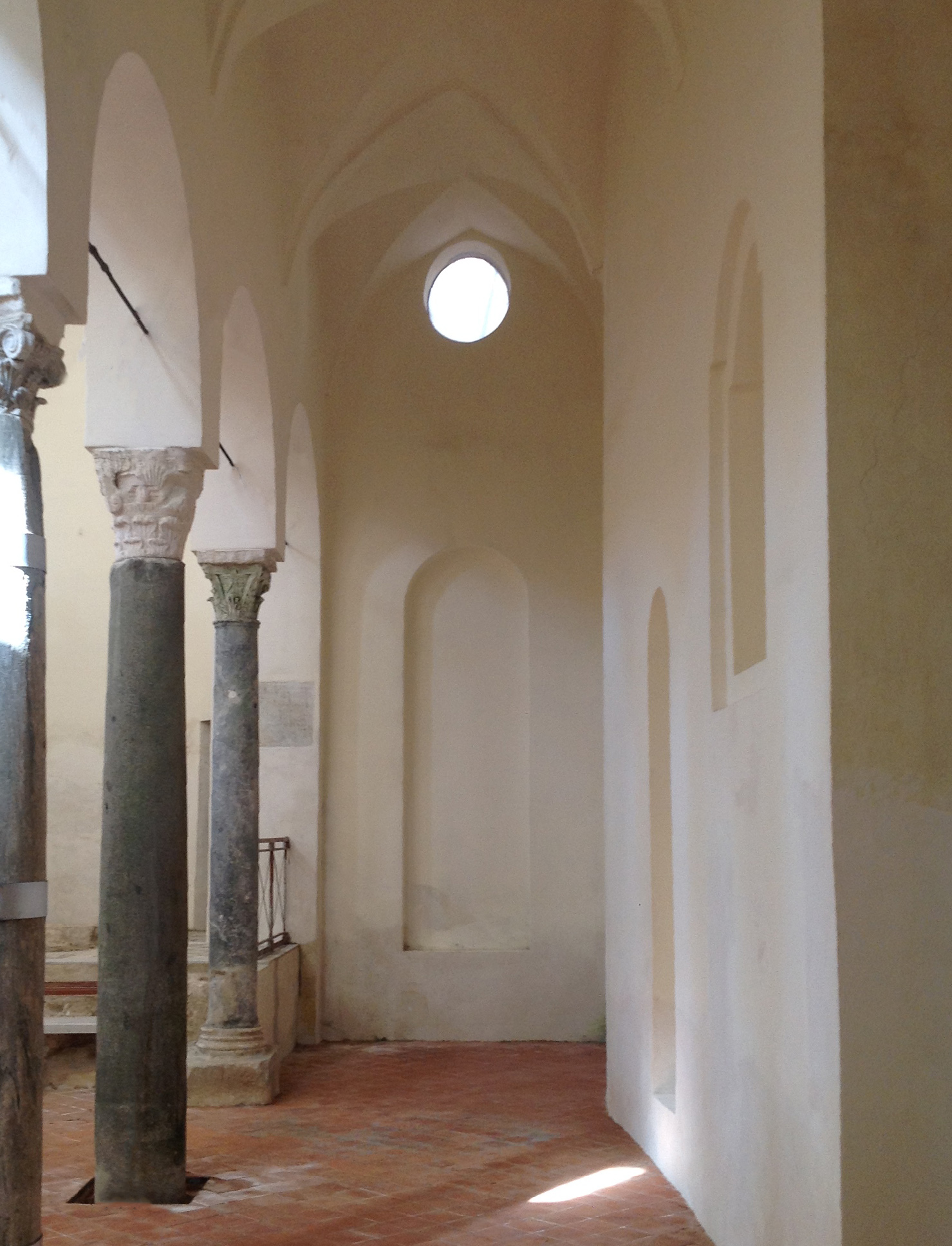
Interior of the right side aisle.

In the left aisle, in the upper part of the outer wall are pieces of poorly preserved frescoes dating from the second half of the 12th century and therefore partially obliterated by the 13th-century vaults; they belong to a broader theory of saints of which the busts of three blessing figures are preserved in the first bay (respectively, from the counterfacade, a bishop bearing a book, the second bearing a crown, and the third - separated from the others by a frame - of a further bishop holding a gem-studded codex), and between the second and third two other poorly preserved saints in a standing position.

Niches of different age and shape enliven the side walls of the building. In the third bay of the right aisle is an arched Baroque niche formerly framed by the altarpiece dedicated to St. Agnellus of Naples and containing the wooden statue of the dedicatee. At the end of the two aisles open two symmetrical, round-arched and slightly protruding ones, the result of the filling in during the restorations in the second half of the 20th century of the two doors (each with an ogival lunette) that had been opened in 1934-1937, at a higher elevation than the present floor level because the last bay of the aisles was on the same level as the chancel; above the right-hand niche, a small circular rose window opens to the outside. A large ogival niche is located in the last bay of the left aisle, on the side wall, and has a much deteriorated fresco with a marble frame at the top and at the bottom two standing figures of saints of which in the one on the right would have been identified as St. Christopher (second half of the 14th century).

In the southern wall of the last bay of the right aisle, at the top, there is a rectangular window with upper beveled corners, closed by a wooden grating; it faces a rear cross-vaulted room, formerly used as a chancel and containing a pipe organ, inside which there are traces of a small walled-in mullioned window, probably dating from the 15th century.

===== Elements of the early medieval church =====
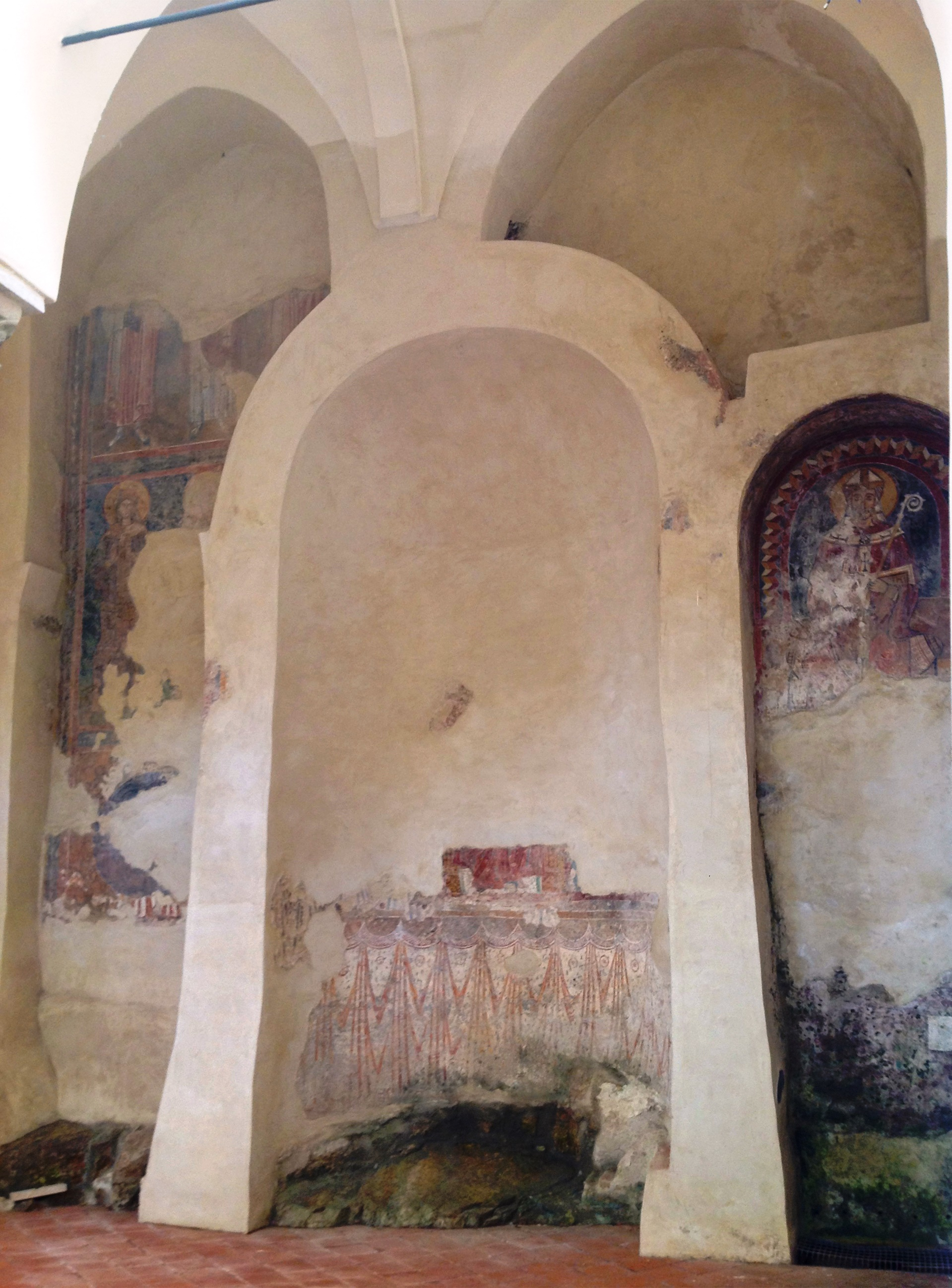
Back wall of the early medieval church, with the apse and the two niches.

The first two bays of the hall correspond to the area occupied by the ancient early medieval church; of the latter, the entrance door, now walled up, is still visible in the outer wall of the left aisle, between the first and second bays; in the wall are traces of two single-light round windows. The plugged door also located in the left aisle, in the present counter-facade wall, would be what remains of an ancient side entrance on what was the right flank of the hall. On the opposite side of today's church, in the wall of the first and second right bays are three niches identifiable with the termination of the 8th-9th century church: in the center is a small apse with a semicircular plan, while the side niches are shallower, with a rectangular base and, the one on the right, crowned with a round arch; the left niche (originally symmetrical to the other) is currently higher than the apsidiole and terminates with a pointed arch that also includes the latter. The considerable inward projection of the apse would probably be attributable to the impossibility of extending the apse outward because of the rock wall behind, partly emerging in the lower area of the architectural complex itself.

The termination of the early medieval church presents a fresco pictorial palimpsest that is the result of a complex stratification that began in the 8th-9th centuries and ended in the early 15th century. The apse presents in the lower part a high velarium terminating above with a dense net motif, which can be traced back to the first half of the 12th century and made in place of an older drapery (late 8th century-early 9th) contemporary with a fragmentary piece featuring a roof slope still visible to the right of the arch framing the hemicycle, above the niche. In the upper part of the apse was an enthroned Madonna and Child among angels or saints from the first half of the 13th century, a painting of which the lower part of the richly decorated throne, the feet of the Virgin and the blessing hand of Jesus remain, an update of an older painting that has been lost. The niche on the right bears a fragment of a double flounced veil at the bottom (late 12th century-early 13th) and at the top St. Nicholas, shown seated and blessing (second half of the 13th century); in the intrados of the arch is a dense polychrome weave. The left niche has a large piece of the 1070-80s pictorial decoration of the back wall of the former medieval church; it has three levels divided by frames: in the lower one a wheel inscribed within a lozenge with grisaille decoration; in the middle one two standing saints of whom the one on the left is best preserved, a woman in imperial dress of Byzantine fashion holding a thin processional cross and a crown on her head (probably St. Catherine of Alexandria); in the upper one three additional standing figures respectively (from the right) of a saint in a short tunic and red mantle, a saint in episcopal robes, and a saint in rich military garb, holding a crown. Between the second and third register runs an inscription bearing the names of the patrons: Giovanni Cotina, mentioned in the Codex diplomaticus cajetanus for the first time in 1064, and his wife Marenda, recorded as a widow in a 1089 document included in the same collection. Belonging to the early medieval church is the poorly preserved piece (of which only the separating frame of two registers is visible) located at the northern end of the ancient counterfaçade, currently visible under the 12th-century fresco between the second and third bays of the left aisle.

==== Presbytery and apse ====
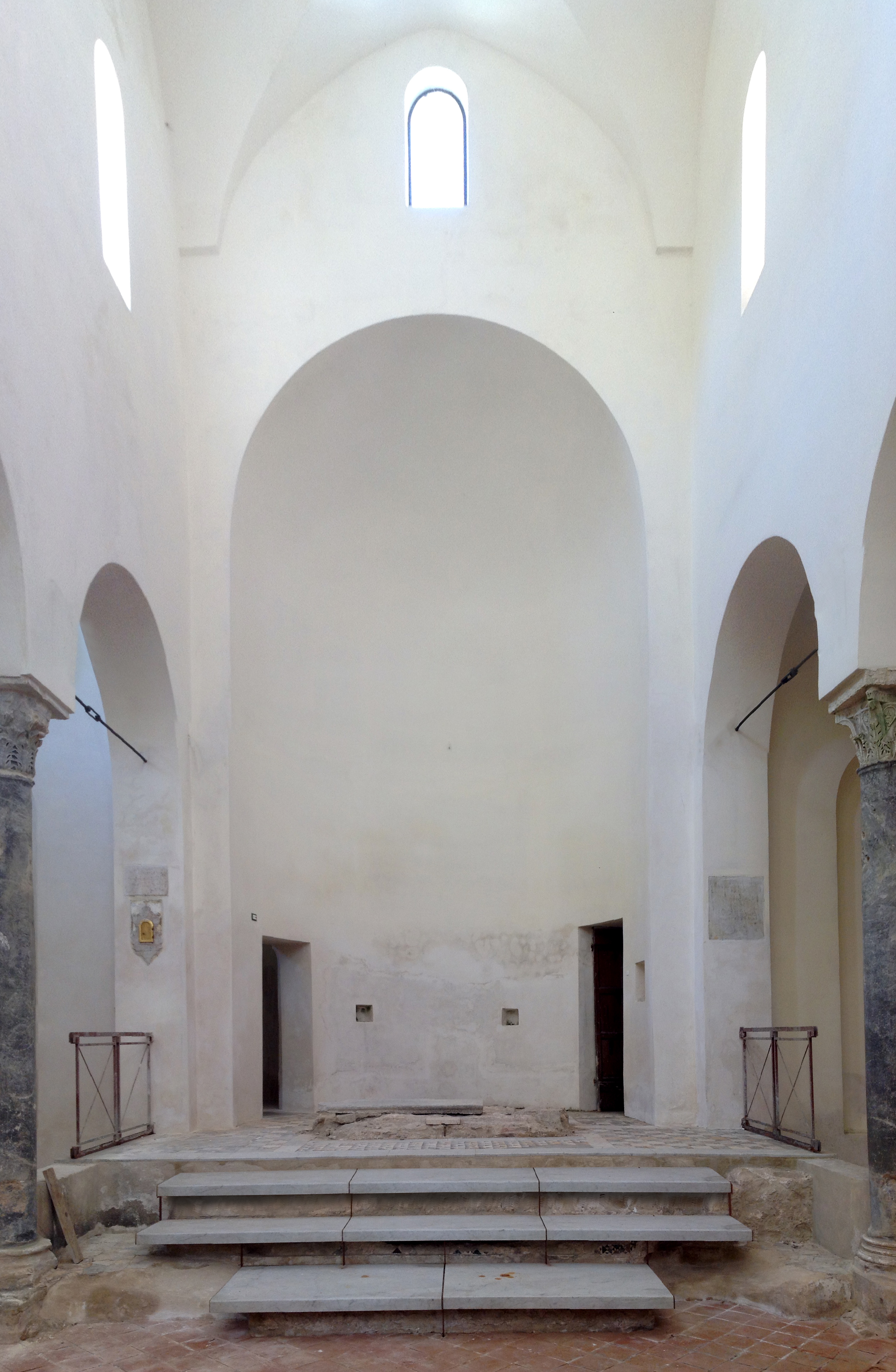
Presbytery and apse.

The presbytery area, corresponding to that of the 12th century and restored to its original perimeter during the restorations of the 1980s, occupies most of the last bay of the nave and the entire semicircular apse, devoid of decoration; the latter, slightly narrower than the nave, opens in the back wall with a round arch, surmounted by a single lancet window overlooking the exterior. On either side of the apse, in the half-pillars supporting the arches dividing the aisles, are walled a Baroque marble tabernacle (on the left, decorated with some volutes), and two epigraphic plaques from the second half of the 18th century: the one on the right, dated 1755, commemorates the restorations promoted by parish priest Francesco Orecchia Sales, the one on the left the consecration of the church that took place in 1765 by the then bishop of Gaeta Gennaro Carmignani.

The presbytery is accessed only on the front side, where the area extends to the last column on each side with a wooden platform; below the latter are the mosaic remains of the ancient steps. Of the high altar made by Gino Chierici in 1934-1937 and placed below the apsidal arch, no traces remain. The current flooring of the presbyteral area dates back to the restorations of the 1980s and was made by juxtaposing cosmatesque mosaic fragments already present inside the building, without reconstructing their original arrangement, found during the restorations of the 1930s; they can be dated to the 12th century on the basis of the strong similarities with contemporary floors of the Lazio and Campania areas. The panels show different types of patterns (inscribed squares, triangles, hexagons), with the use of numerous varieties of marble; the bands separating them are both made of stone and terracotta, and incorporate some epigraphic fragments. Still in their original position, on the second ancient step of access to the chancel, are the surviving elements of a decorative band of serpentine, porphyry, and white marble. In the center of the basin of the apse, there is an installation entitled Tamburo e stramma (2021).

== Works already present in the church ==
=== Paintings by Giovanni da Gaeta ===
==== Tryptych of the Coronation of the Virgin ====
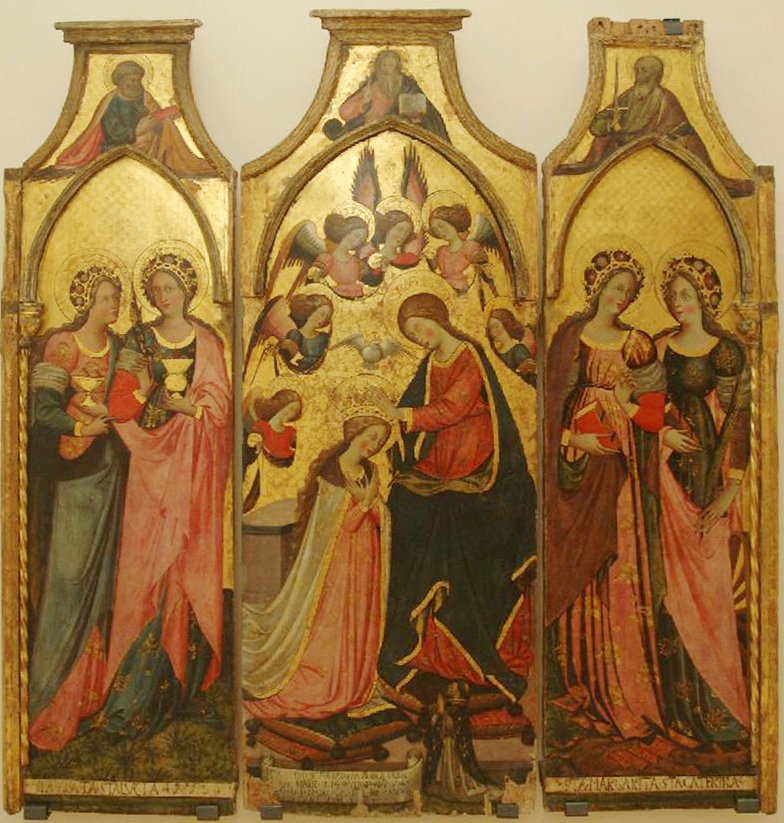
Giovanni da Gaeta, Triptych of the Coronation of the Virgin among Saints (1456).

The church of Santa Lucia housed, before its deconsecration, one of the most important works of the painter Giovanni da Gaeta: the triptych with the Coronation of the Virgin among Saints, originally located above the high altar, which is fundamental for the reconstruction from an art-historical point of view of the personality of its author. Before its definitive attribution to the Gaetan painter (established by the art critic Federico Zeri in 1950, who would call him precisely because of this panel "Master of 1456" until the discovery of his name, published in 1960), the triptych had been erroneously attributed to Beato Angelico or to another artist of the Tuscan school of the 15th century due to the presence and activity, at that time, of many Tuscan painters in Naples.

The triptych was commissioned by parish priest Giuliano D'Orca in 1456 and made that same year, as evidenced by the following inscription in Latin, found in the cartouche at the bottom of the central panel:

HOC [OPUS ?] FIERI FEC(IT) P(RES)B(YTE)R IULIANUS DORCA PRIOR / [SANCTAE] MARI(A)E INPENSULIS P(RO) A(N)I(M)A SUA / [AN]NO D(OMI)NI MCCCCLVI D [--?] E DIE XXV / MENSIS MARCII QUARTE I[N]D(ICTIONIS)
The presbyter Giuliano D'Orca, prior of Santa Maria in Pensulis, had this work done for his soul in the year of our Lord 1456 on the 25th day of March, fourth indiction.

—Inscription in the cartouche of the central panel.

The center panel depicts the scene of the coronation of the Virgin Mary by Jesus, surrounded by six angels and with the presence of the dove of the Holy Spirit; in the lower part, on the right, is portrayed the commissioner of the work in priestly vestments. In the left panel are St. Agatha and St. Lucy, and in the right panel are St. Margaret of Antioch and St. Catherine of Alexandria. Above are depicted God the Father (center), St. Peter (left) and St. Paul (right).

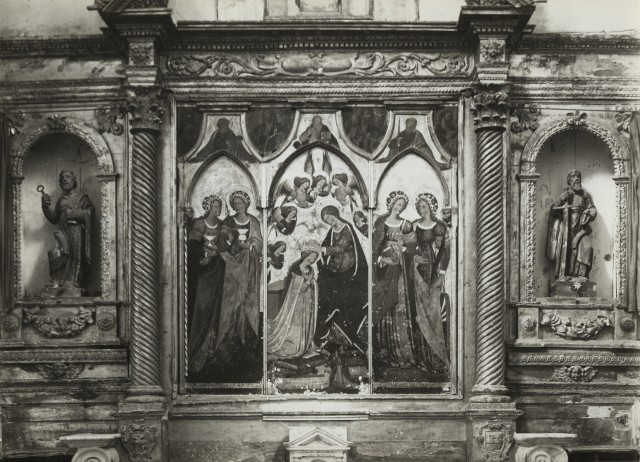
The triptych above the high altar together with the cornice and retable with the statues of St. Peter and St. Paul, in a photograph before the 1934-1938 restorations.

The style shows heterogeneous influences, with a strong reference to medieval painting from different geographical areas: the gold background engraved in small squares, common to both Neapolitan Gothic and late 14th-century Marche, is combined with the general compositional scheme, typical of early 15th-century Sicilian-southern painting, and the hairstyles of the saints characterized by a double crown, as in the Cavallini workshop frescoes in the choir of the nuns of Santa Maria Donnaregina Vecchia in Naples (1320-1335); Iberian influences are also strong, particularly in the slender elegance of the saints and angels. Overall, the Gaetan Coronation can be likened to other paintings by Giovanni da Gaeta, particularly those with similar subject matter currently at the church of Saint Francis in Maiori and the Museum of Fine Arts in Nice, in terms of its appeal to the "expressionistic unrealism of Umbrian-Marche culture" that has its greatest representative in Bartolomeo di Tommaso.

The work, subsequent to its completion, was placed inside a 16th-century gilded and carved wooden frame in the Renaissance style, formerly the front wall of the 16th-century organ case in Gaeta Cathedral, bearing the coat of arms of the Vaccarelli family. It retained its location even after restorations in the second quarter of the 20th century only to be removed in 1956 and subjected to conservative restoration a first time in that same year by Rocco Ventura, and a second time in 1976 by Rolando Dionisi. The triptych has been on display inside the Diocesan Museum since the latter's inauguration (1956), first without a frame, then inside the same after the removal of the artifact from the former church in 2008; in the current arrangement (2014) the two wooden statues of St. Peter and St. Paul are placed at its sides according to their original location above the Baroque altar of St. Lucy.

==== Crucifix ====
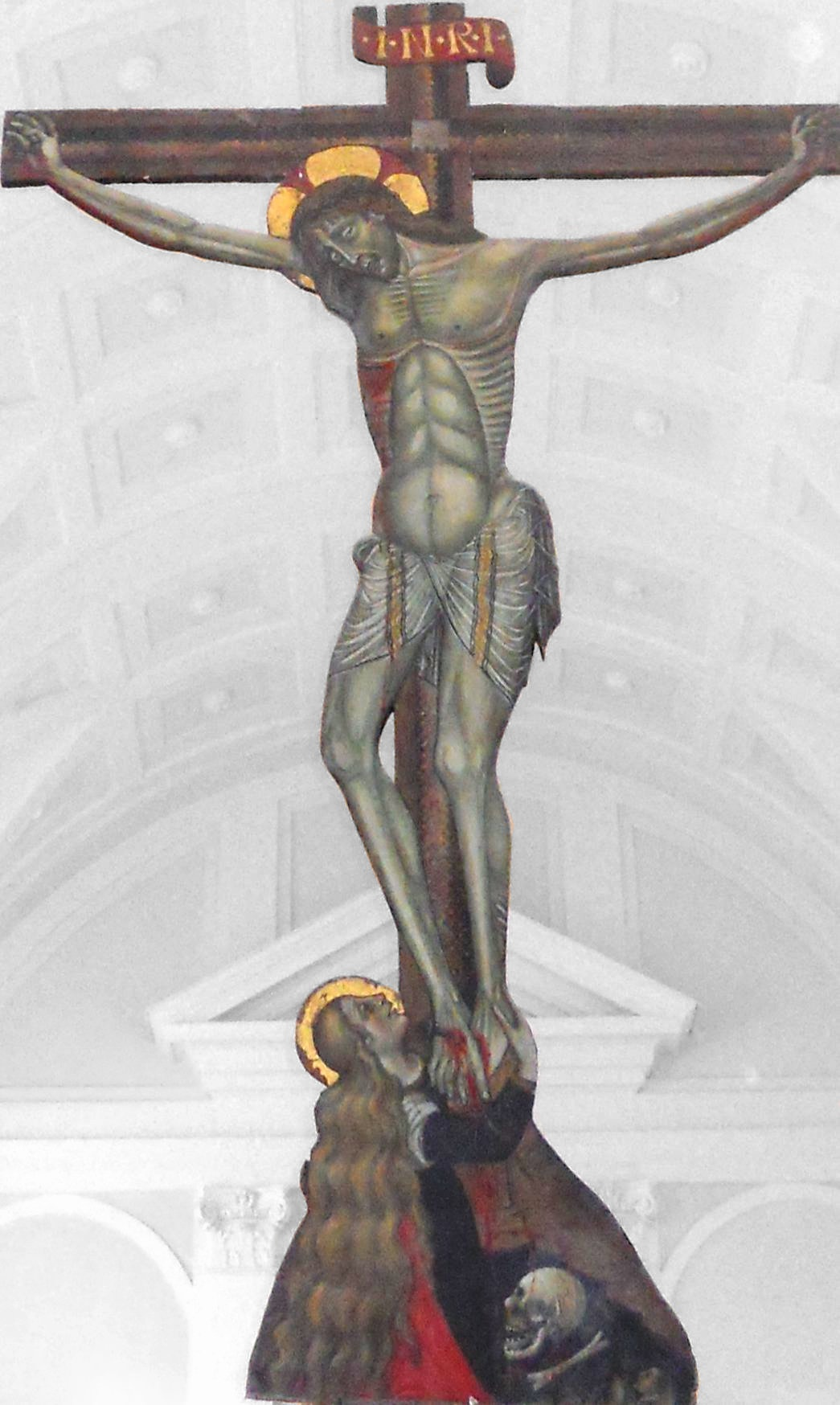
Giovanni da Gaeta, Crucifix (1460s).

Also in the church was a Crucifix painted on panel, until the 1930s restorations located on the altar at the end of the right aisle, then on the counterfacade, also by Giovanni da Gaeta and datable in the 1460s.

The work is characterized by a very accentuated trapezoidal base and the presence in the latter of the figure of Mary Magdalene embracing the feet of the agonized Jesus; beside her is the skull of Adam, according to the narration in the Golden Legend by Jacobus de Voragine (13th century), while on the lower right is visible the commissioner of the work in a praying position, the then parish priest of Santa Maria in Pensulis Giuliano D'Orca. The figure of Christ is characterized by a hollowed-out body, minutely described in its various anatomical components; the loincloth that encircles his hips recalls the artifacts of Gaetan textile production of the 15th century. On the back side of the panel is reproduced the same scene seen, however, from behind the cross, which overall, partly due to the poor state of preservation, is barely sketched.

The painting represents one of the examples of painted and silhouetted crucifixes made in the Campania and Lazio area in the 15th century. The influence of 14th-century painting is strong, especially in the position of the body and the fluttering of the loincloth, to which "modern accents of dramatic realism" are combined.

The crucifix was removed in 1956 and restored in that same year by Rocco Ventura, and was then displayed inside the Diocesan Museum. In 2014 it was placed inside Gaeta Cathedral, above the new high altar consecrated in September of that year, before returning again to the interior of the aforementioned museum in 2018, where it remains today.

=== Detached frescoes ===
Several buildings in the city of Gaeta display detached frescoes from the interior walls of the former church of Santa Lucia.

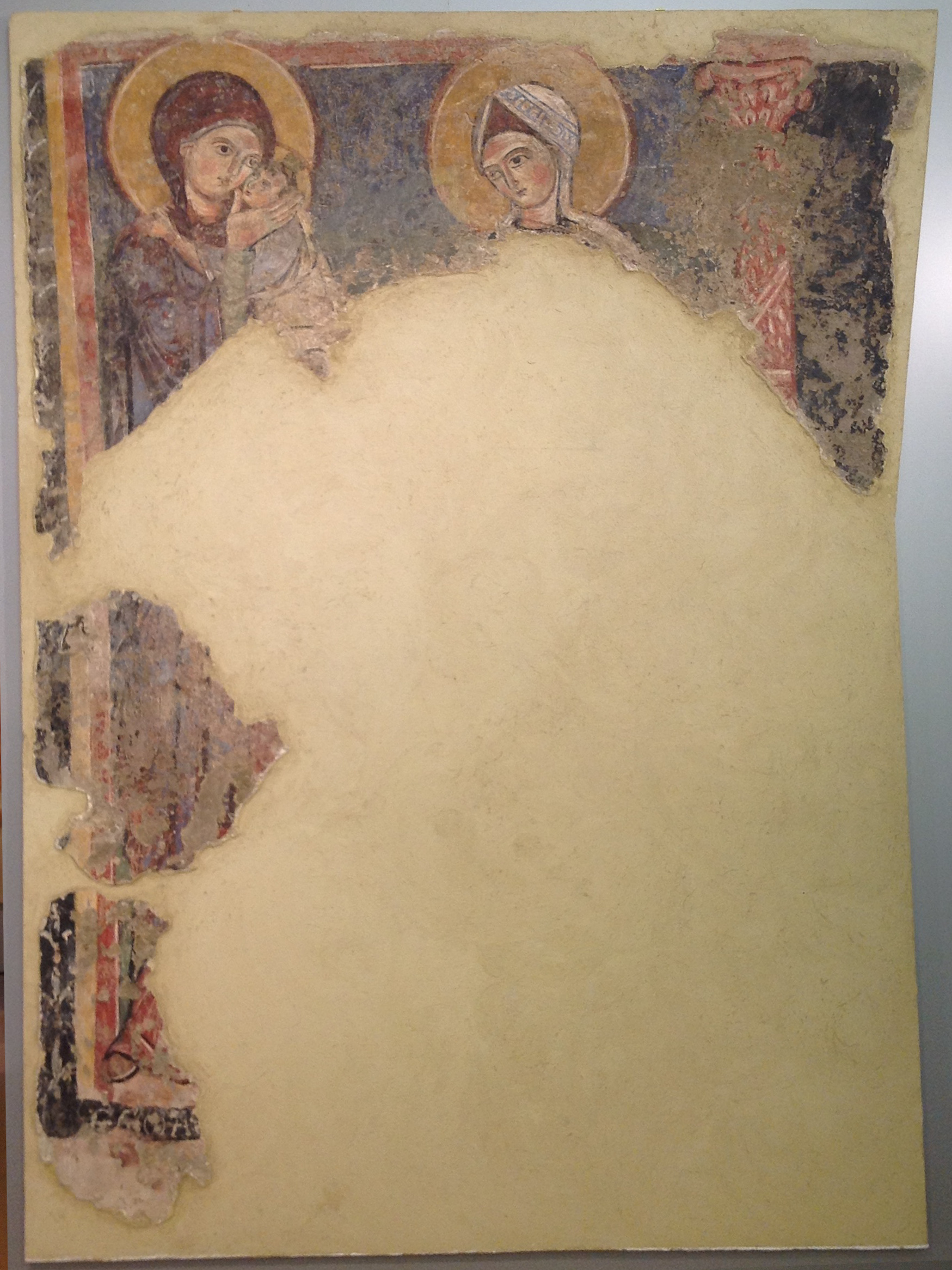
Museum of Historical Cultural Center "Gaeta," Madonna Glycophilousa and saint (second half of the 12th century).

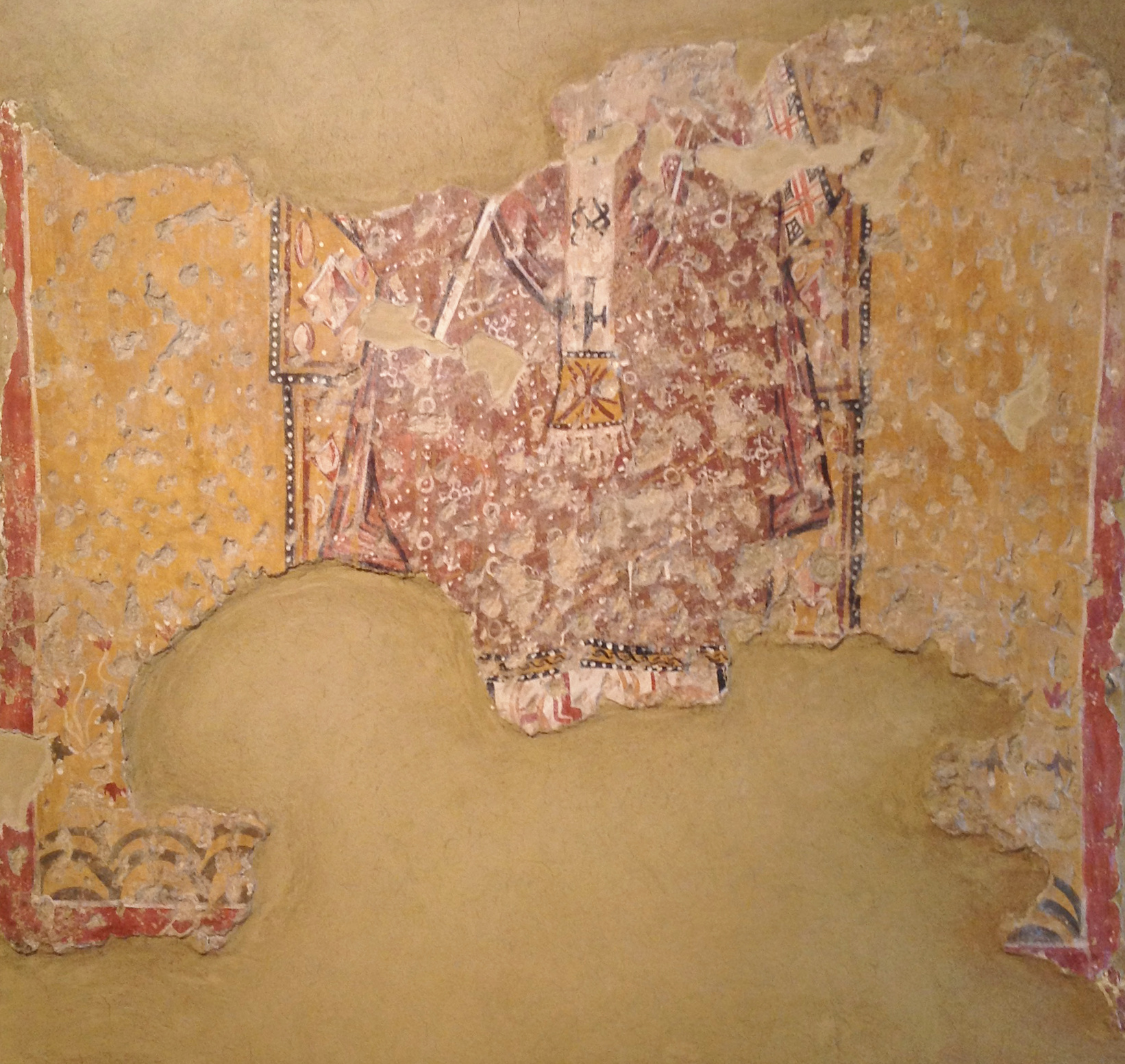
Museum of Historical Cultural Center "Gaeta," Holy Bishop (second half of the 13th century).

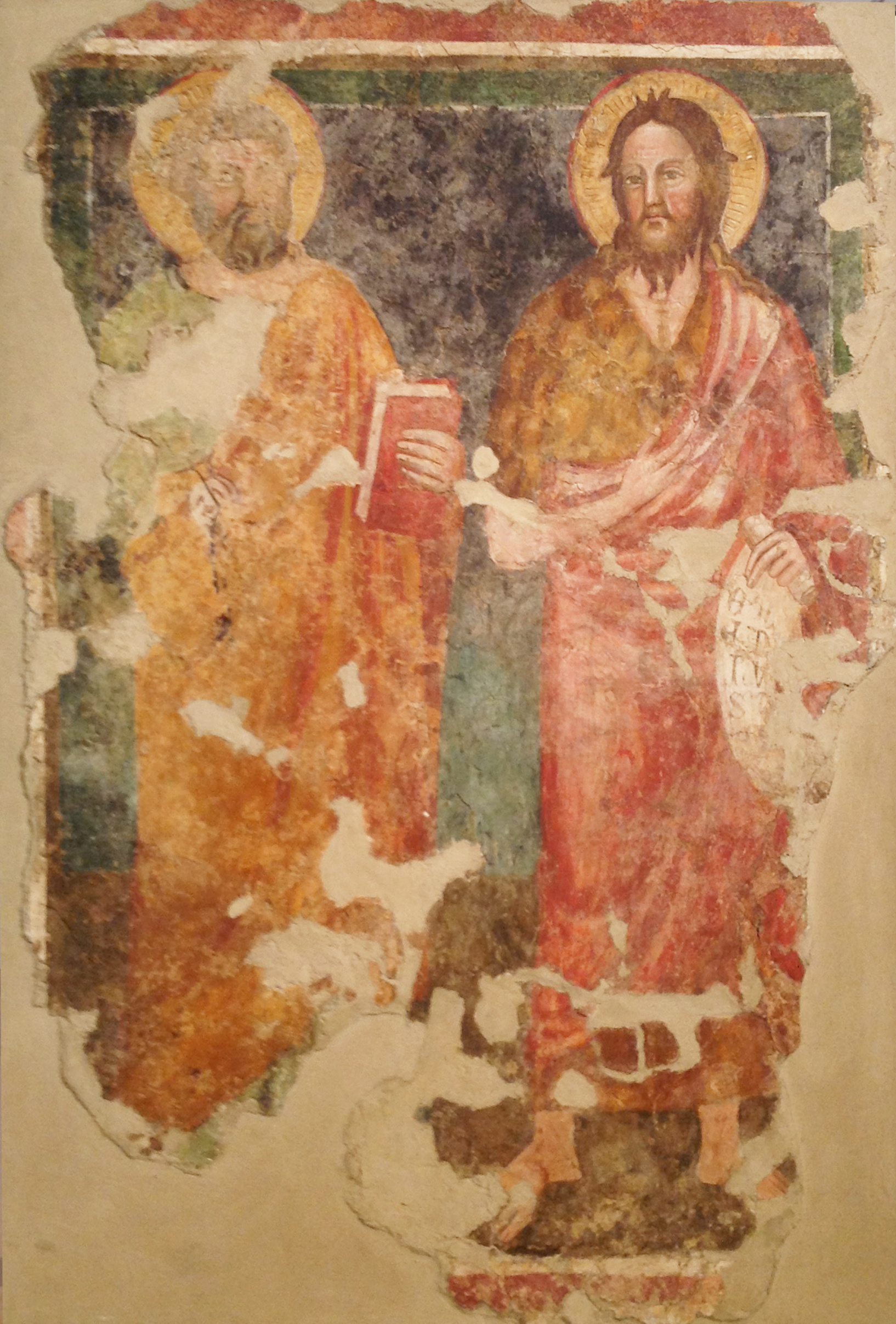
Museum of Historical Cultural Center "Gaeta," St. Peter and St. John the Baptist (second half of the 14th century).

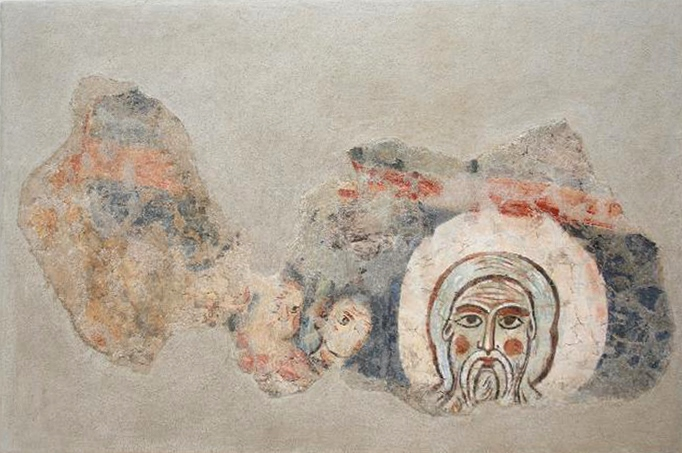
Diocesan Museum and of Religiosity of the Aurunci Mountains Park, Abraham and the Elect (second half of the 12th century).

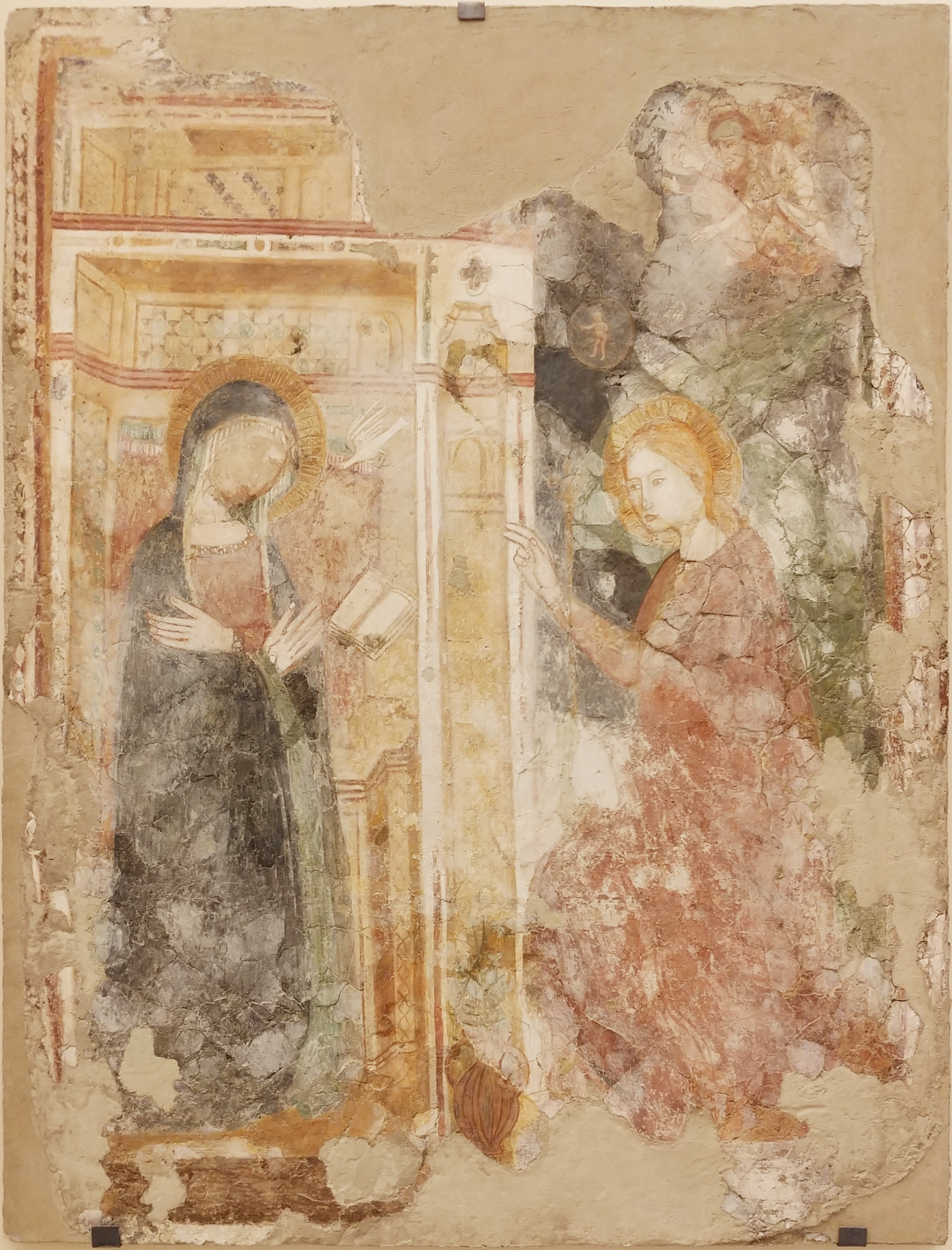
Cathedral of Saints Erasmus and Marcianus and St. Mary of the Assumption, Annunciation (late 14th century-early 15th century).

Three large pieces from the back wall of the early medieval church are displayed in the Museum of the Historical Cultural Center "Gaeta."

- Madonna Glycophilousa and saint, from the second half of the 12th century, originally placed to cover the lower order with saints to the left of the apse and detached in 1985-1986. The painting is lost in the central part, while the upper section with the Madonna and Child on the left, a veiled head of an unidentifiable saint at her side and, at the far right, the termination of a richly carved red marble column is well preserved; of the inscription that ran on the lower cornice only the initial letters remain: "EGO A[- - -]." The style, with soaring figures with round heads, strongly recalls Umbrian painting probably because of Gaeta's commercial and cultural iterations at the time.
- Saint Bishop, contemporary with the Saint Nicholas still in situ and originally symmetrical to it, in the upper part of the left niche, also detached in 1985-1986. Of that painting the lower part is preserved, which stands out against an ochre background, depicting a bishop in pontifical robes seated on a gem-studded throne; immediately above the lower frame, there are plant elements to represent a flowering meadow.
- St. Peter and St. John the Baptist, from the second half of the 14th century, originally located in the right niche, between the upper (and surviving) part of the fresco of St. Nicholas and the partially preserved veil below, detached in 1974-1975. Against a cerulean background framed in white and red, the figures of the Apostle (on the left) and the Forerunner (on the right) stand out; the style recalls the post-Cavallinian sphere and has an immediate counterpart in the Theory of Four Saints (one of which is indeed the Baptist) on the wall of a building attached to the cathedral currently included in the Diocesan Museum's exhibition itinerary.

In the Diocesan Museum and of the religiosity of the Aurunci Mountains Park there is a piece of fresco with Abraham and the elect; it dates back to the first half of the 12th century and comes from the counterfacade where it was located to the right of the entrance portal. In the detachment operation carried out in 1975-1976, a tonsured saint within a trefoil arch probably from the 14th century, which was to the right of the surviving piece, and a gem-studded step above it, also presumably from the 12th century, were lost. The fragment that is still visible today would be the only evidence of a larger depiction of the Last Judgment that must have covered the entire wall and presented an articulation on several horizontal registers (no more than three, given the small size of the building) also by virtue of the fact that the position of the patriarch within the Gaetan fresco as a whole is the same as in the mosaic Last Judgment in the basilica of Santa Maria Assunta in Torcello (mid-11th century); the lost step would indicate a theory of apostles on thrones in the upper register.

In the cathedral of Saints Erasmus and Marcianus and St. Mary of the Assumption, on the left wall of the chancel opposite the cathedra is a fresco of the Annunciation from the niche to the left of the early medieval apse and dating from the last decorative campaign of the architectural complex, between the end of the 14th century and the beginning of the next. The painting was detached in 1974-1975 and is in a poor state of preservation; it features on the upper right, above the Archangel, God the Father blessing from which emanates the ray of the Word "which is incarnated in the child Jesus [...] within a sphere" and reaches the Virgin (inserted the latter within a soaring Gothic architecture) through the dove of the Holy Spirit.

=== Marble plutei ===
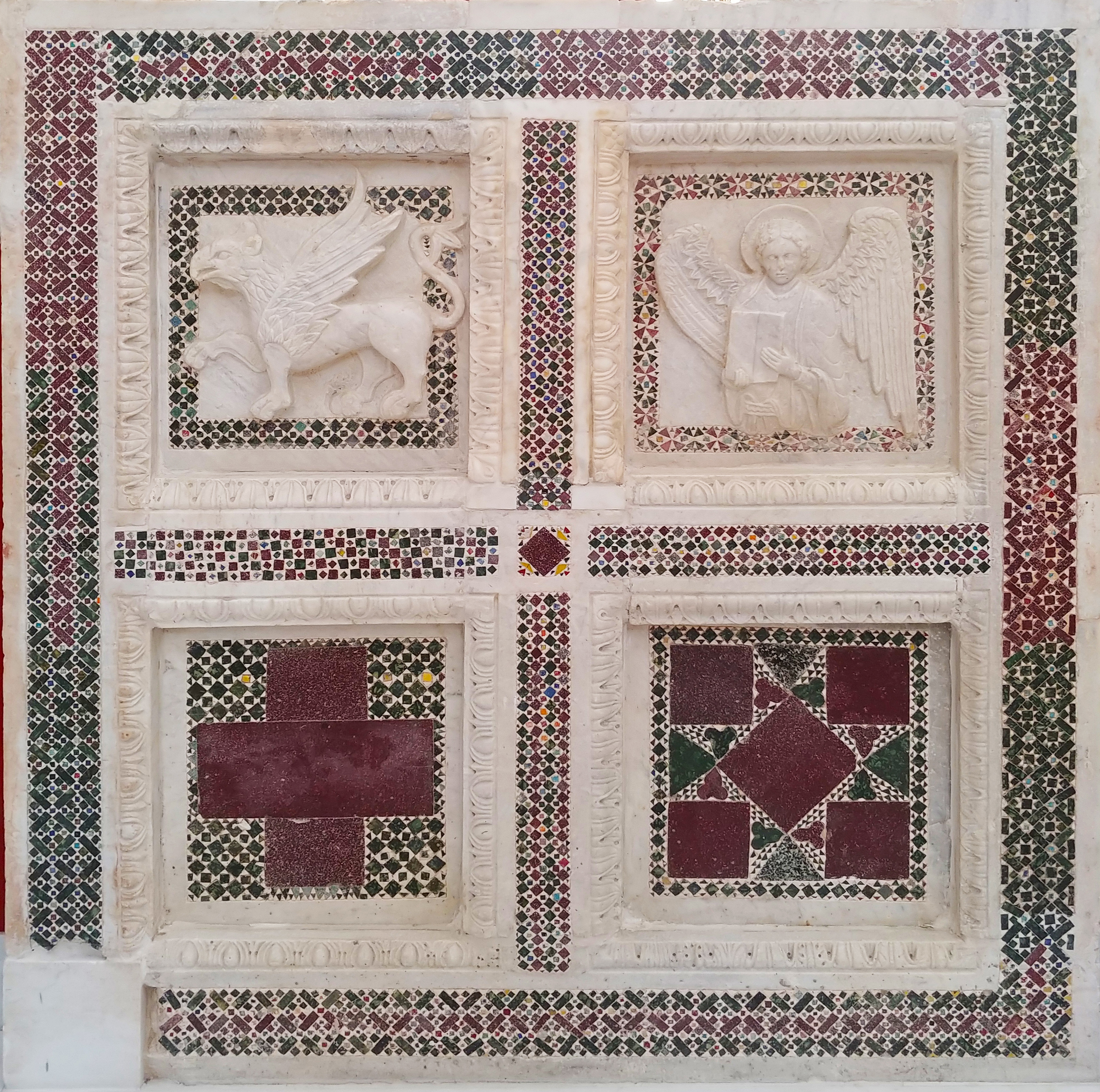
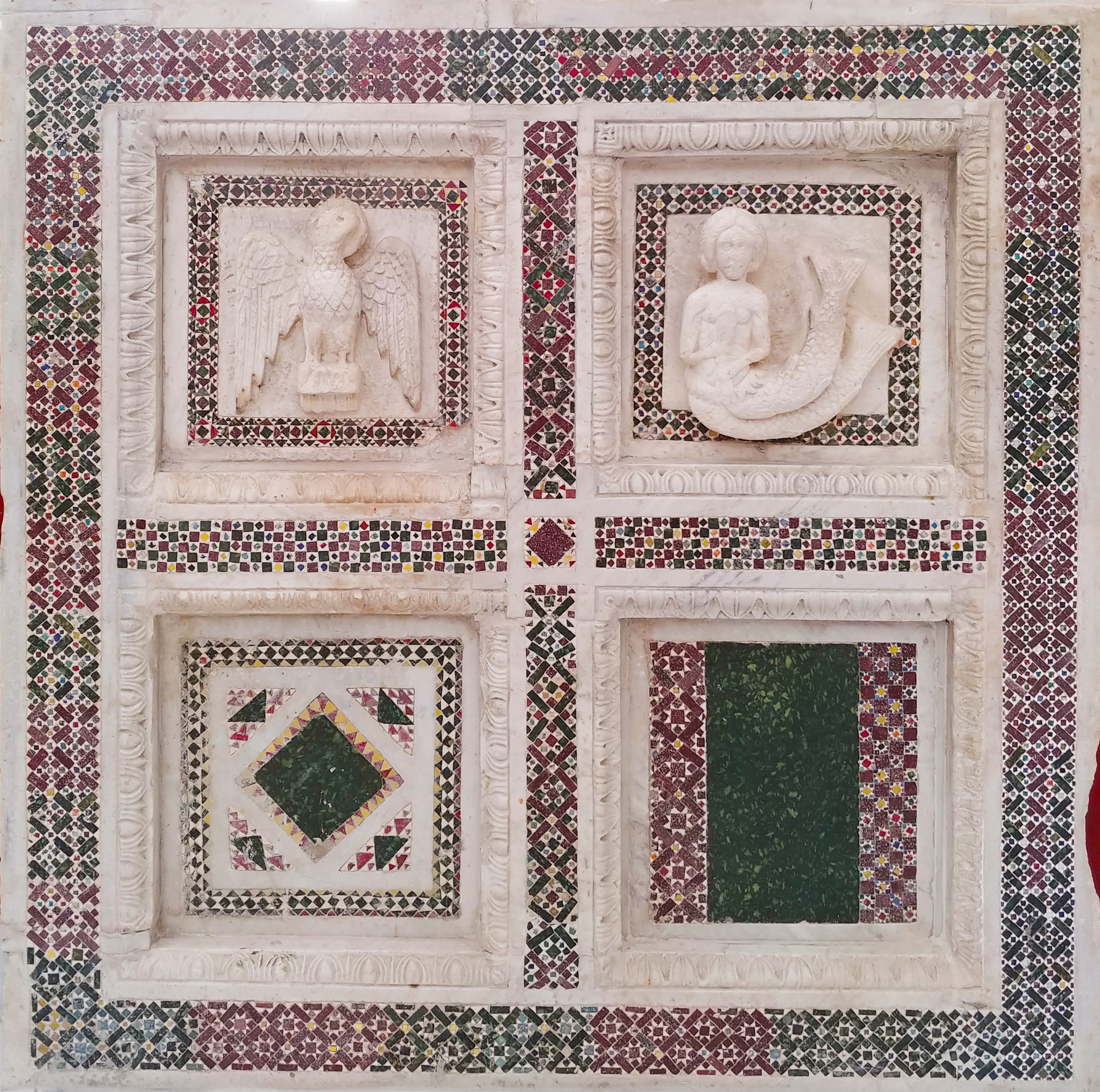
The plutei currently reassembled in Gaeta Cathedral.

As part of the restorations that affected the basilica in 2012-2014, inside the cathedral of Saints Erasmus and Marcianus and Santa Maria Assunta, sculptural and mosaic elements that were part of the medieval plutei from the church of Santa Maria in Pensulis were reassembled by Franco Vitelli and placed at the entrance to the chancel after they had been given into temporary storage and removed from their location in 2009. Mistakenly indicated as parts of the dismembered and lost ancient ambon of the cathedral, from which, according to Onorato Gaetani dell'Aquila d'Aragona, they would have been removed as part of the restorations of the late 18th century, they would rather be the surviving elements of the transennas of the second half of the 13th century made by artists of the Roman sphere, probably belonging to a workshop linked to Nicola d'Angelo; the elegance of the figures and their strong antiquing style recall the ambon of the cathedral of Saints Peter and Paul in Sessa Aurunca (made between 1224 and 1259). Pietro Toesca had related the plutei to the Roman sphere as far as the mosaic was concerned, while he had seen in the figurative panels a reference to Byzantine stylistic features reinterpreted in a Romanesque vein, as in the ambons of the Salerno cathedral; Maria Antonietta Bessone Aureli, on the other hand, considered the mosaics and sculptures of Gaeta to be analogous to the furnishings of the church of San Cesareo de Appia in Rome, St. Peter's in Alba Fucens, and the cathedral of Santa Maria Maggiore in Civita Castellana.

The plutei were composed of surrounding and connecting cornices that feature dense mosaic decoration in polychrome marbles and carved ovular or leaf-shaped edges of twelve panels:

- in the cathedral basilica of Gaeta are the four aniconic panels with marble and mosaic inlays (in cross, lozenge, cross with lozenge, and horizontal bands, respectively, the latter rotated 90° since the 1934-1937 restorations) and as many figurative panels representing respectively the Eagle (symbol of the evangelist John), a two-tailed Mermaid (symbol of lust), the Angel (symbol of the evangelist Matthew) and a Griffin (symbol of both wisdom and the strength of Christ);
- in the Isabella Stewart-Gardner Museum in Boston, U.S.A., in addition to a number of mosaic fragments are the other four tiles depicting a Deer (symbol of the believer), the Lion (symbol of the evangelist Mark), the Bull (symbol of the evangelist Luke) and a Basilisk (considered a devilish animal).

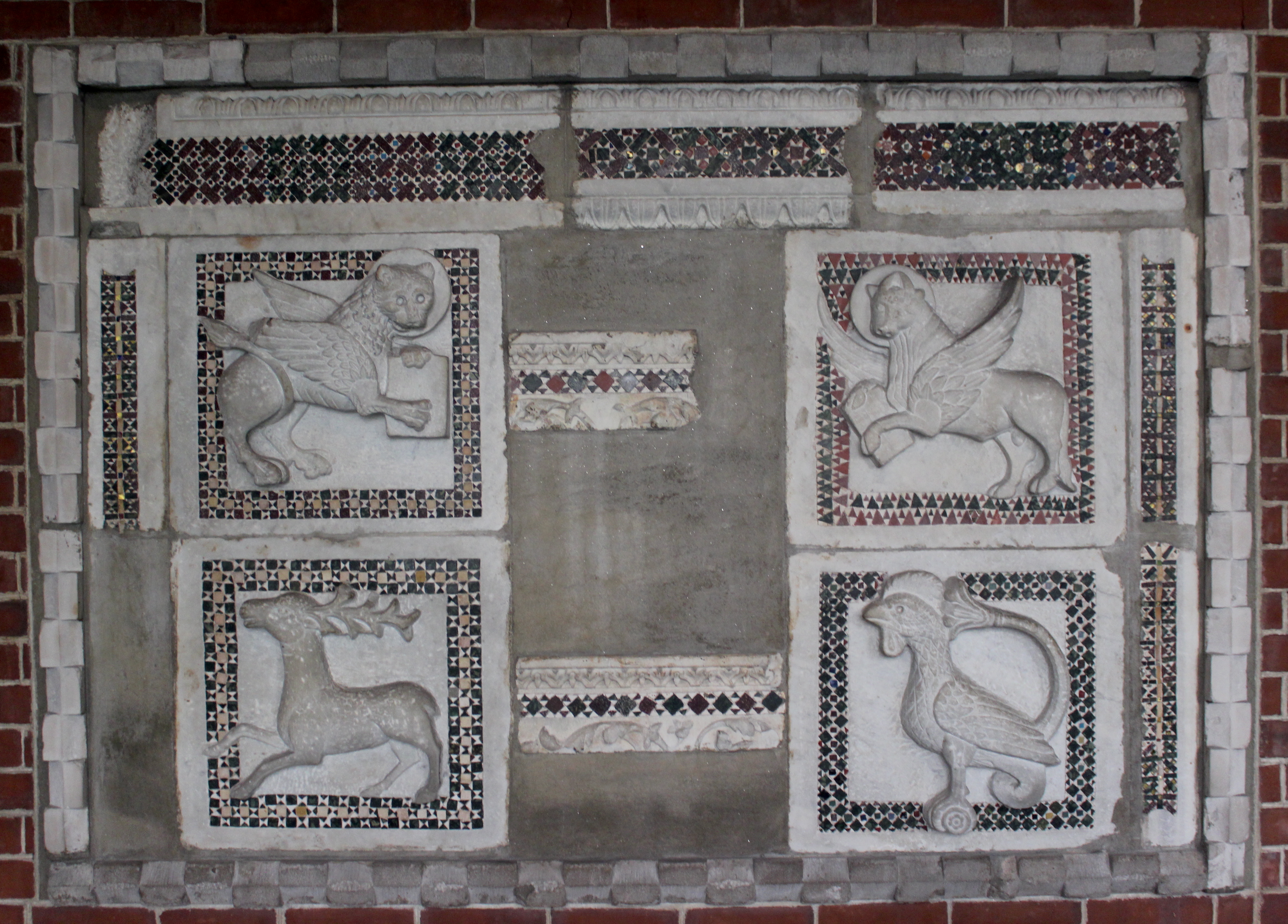
The panels and frame fragments currently displayed at the Isabella Stewart-Gardner Museum in Boston.

Regarding their original location, it has been pinpointed in the church of Santa Maria in Pensulis itself, although their possible belonging to the cathedral has not been ruled out. Their presence in Santa Lucia is testified to from 1837-1839, when Giacinto Gigante drew some details of them; they had a composition in principle similar to the present one and were located below the last two arches of division between the naves, on either side of the chancel, partly concealed by the altars in scagliola and painted wood placed at the end of the aisles; if these altars are two of the three indicated as having been consecrated by Bishop Carmignani in 1755 in the plaque still visible under the right archway, it would mean that at that date the panels were already inside the church. In 1892-1895 the Baroque artifacts were replaced with neoclassical ones in polychrome marble and with more sober forms, as well as considerably more invasive than their predecessors; it is likely that on that occasion four of the eight bas-reliefs were disposed of (the ones concealed by the altars, if it was behind them that they were located), which were then sold in 1897 to Isabella Stewart Gardner and subsequently were transferred to her museum in Boston. The parts sacrificed for the construction of the nineteenth-century altars were integrated in style when, as part of the 1930s restorations, the two panels were dismembered to be arbitrarily reassembled as the high altar; the mosaic frames used by Gino Chierici to frame the wall behind the baptismal font and removed during the 1983-1989 restorations have been lost.

At the end of the 19th century, as evidenced by a historical photograph, there was a marble element with a polygonal base in the church of Santa Lucia that was walled in the floor near the altar of St. Aniello, which is now lost. The element, which has been hypothesized to have originally been the protruding part of an ambon, was ornamented with mosaic bands that, in the three main fields, had the peculiarity of having the upper termination rounded rather than straight, which is why it has been assumed to have been modified over the centuries.

== Image gallery ==
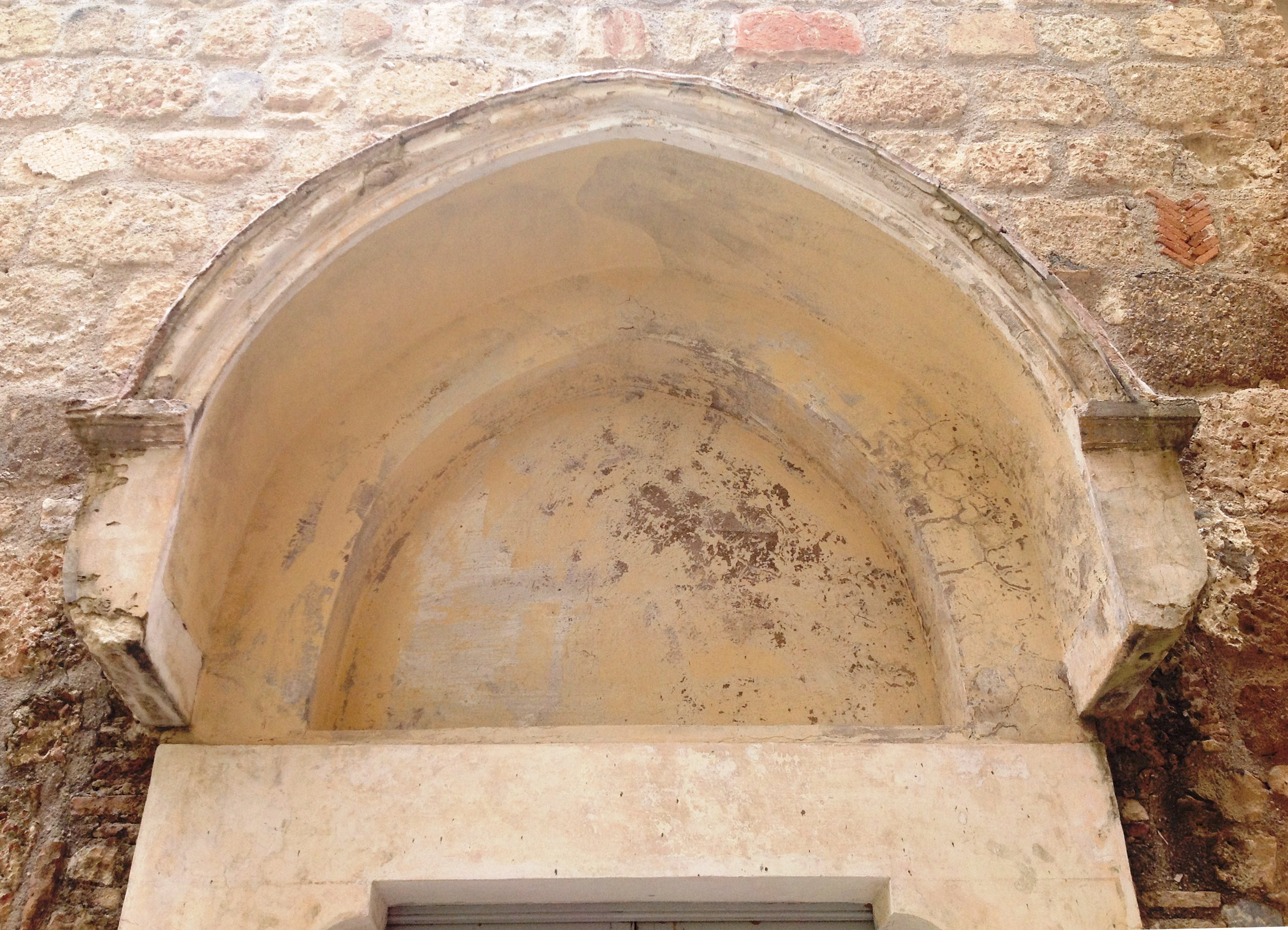
Prothyrum of the portal in the façade

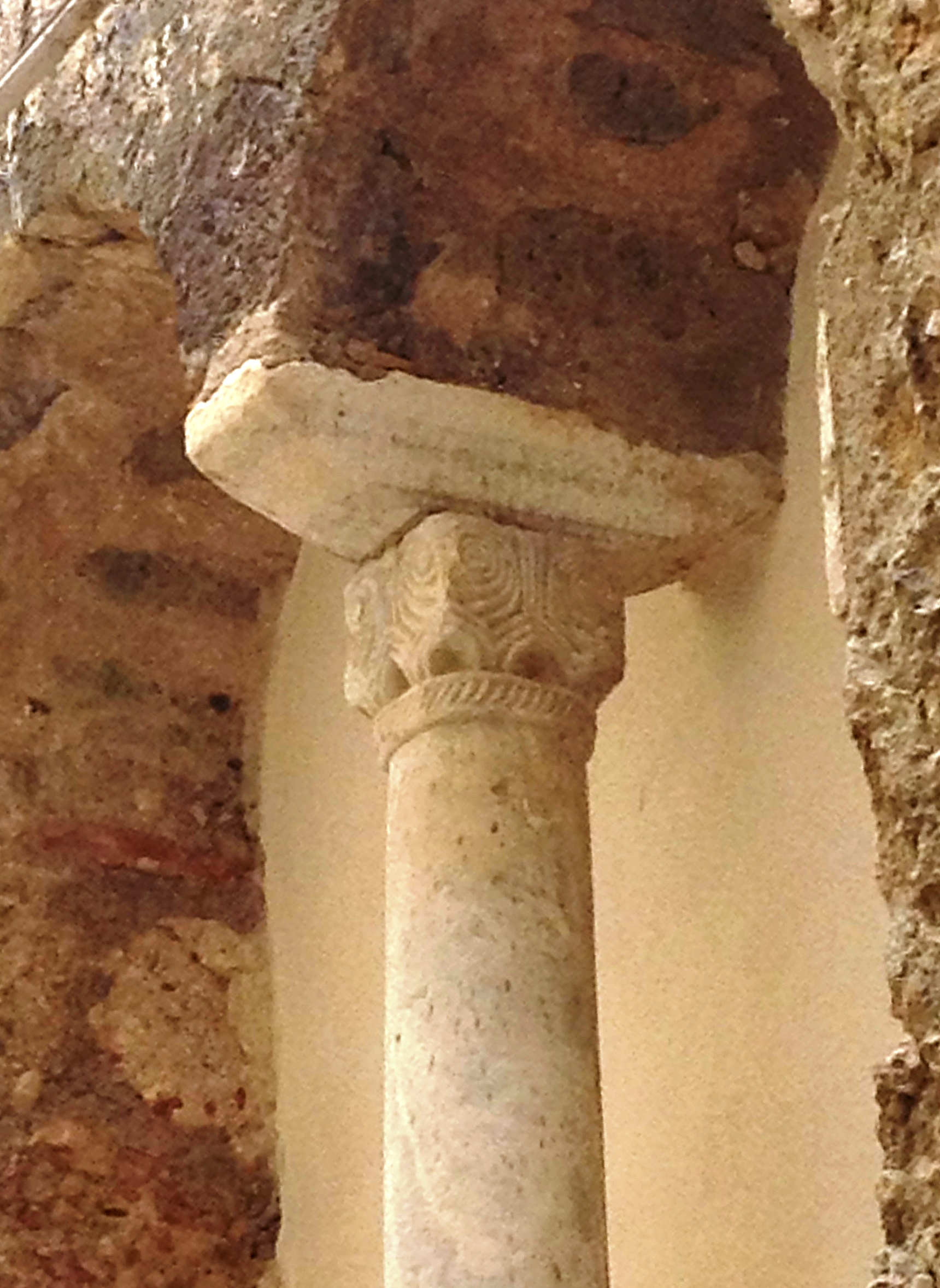
Capitals of the right mullioned window of the façade

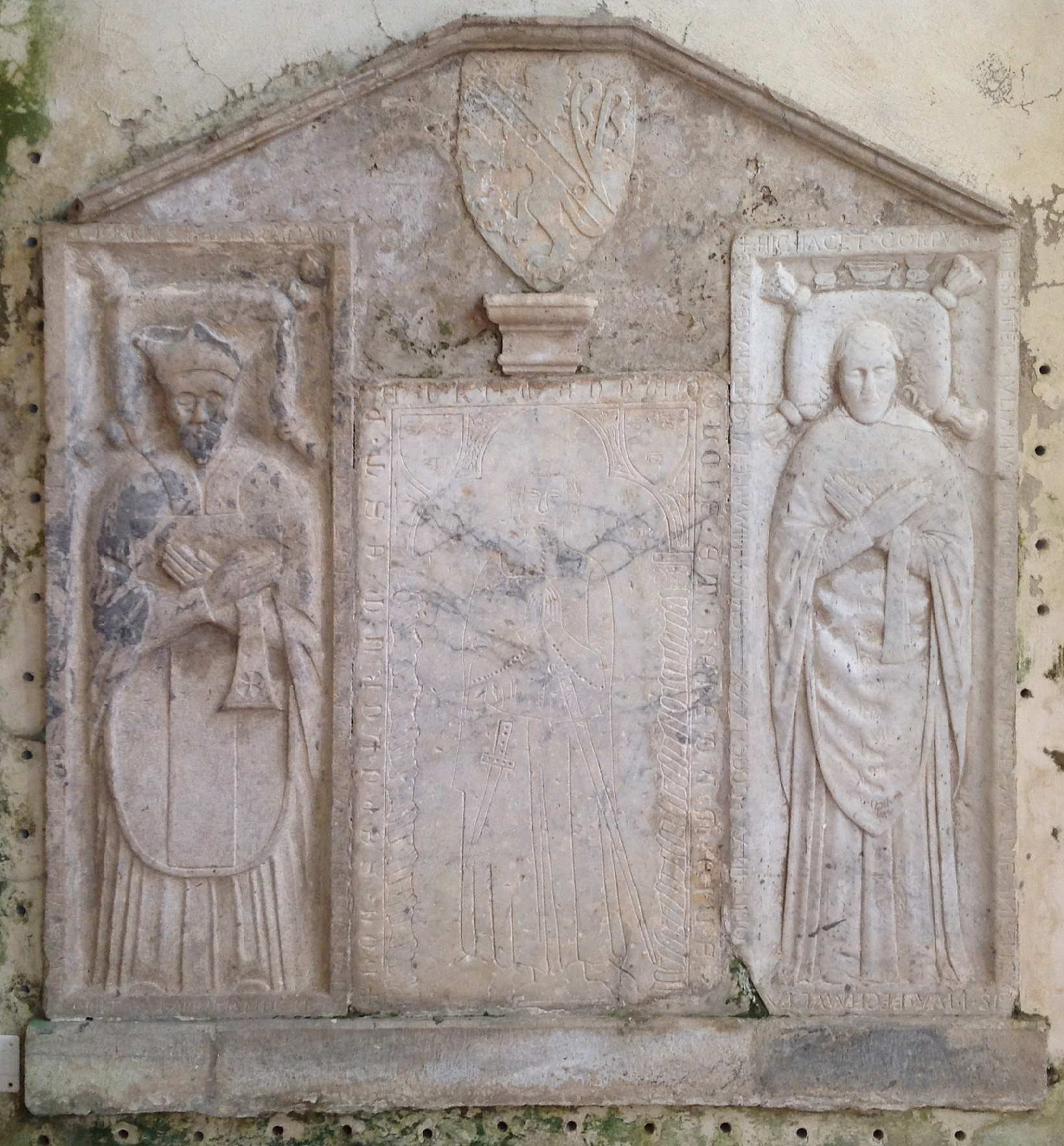
Tomb slabs in the counterfaçade

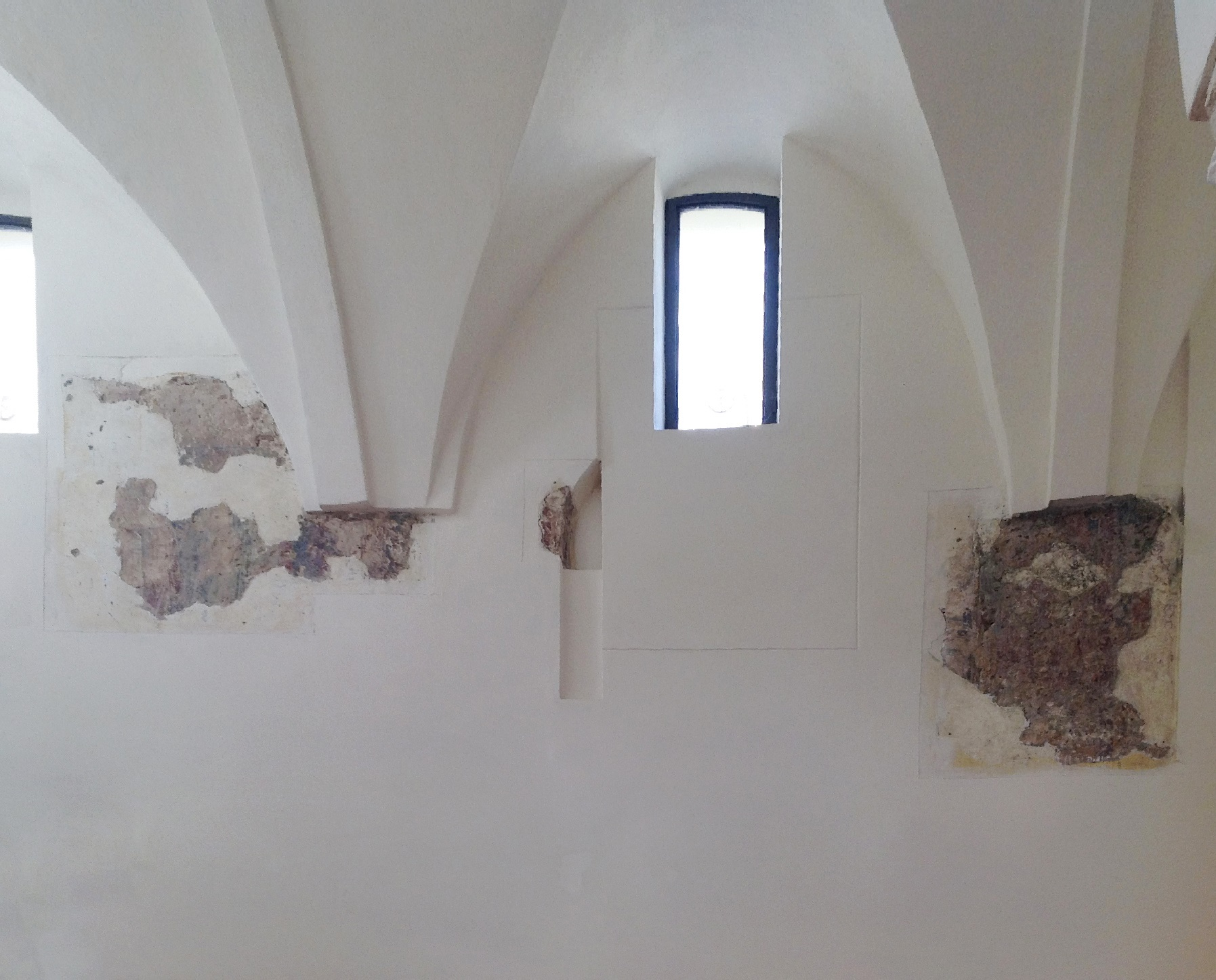
12th century frescoes in the left aisle

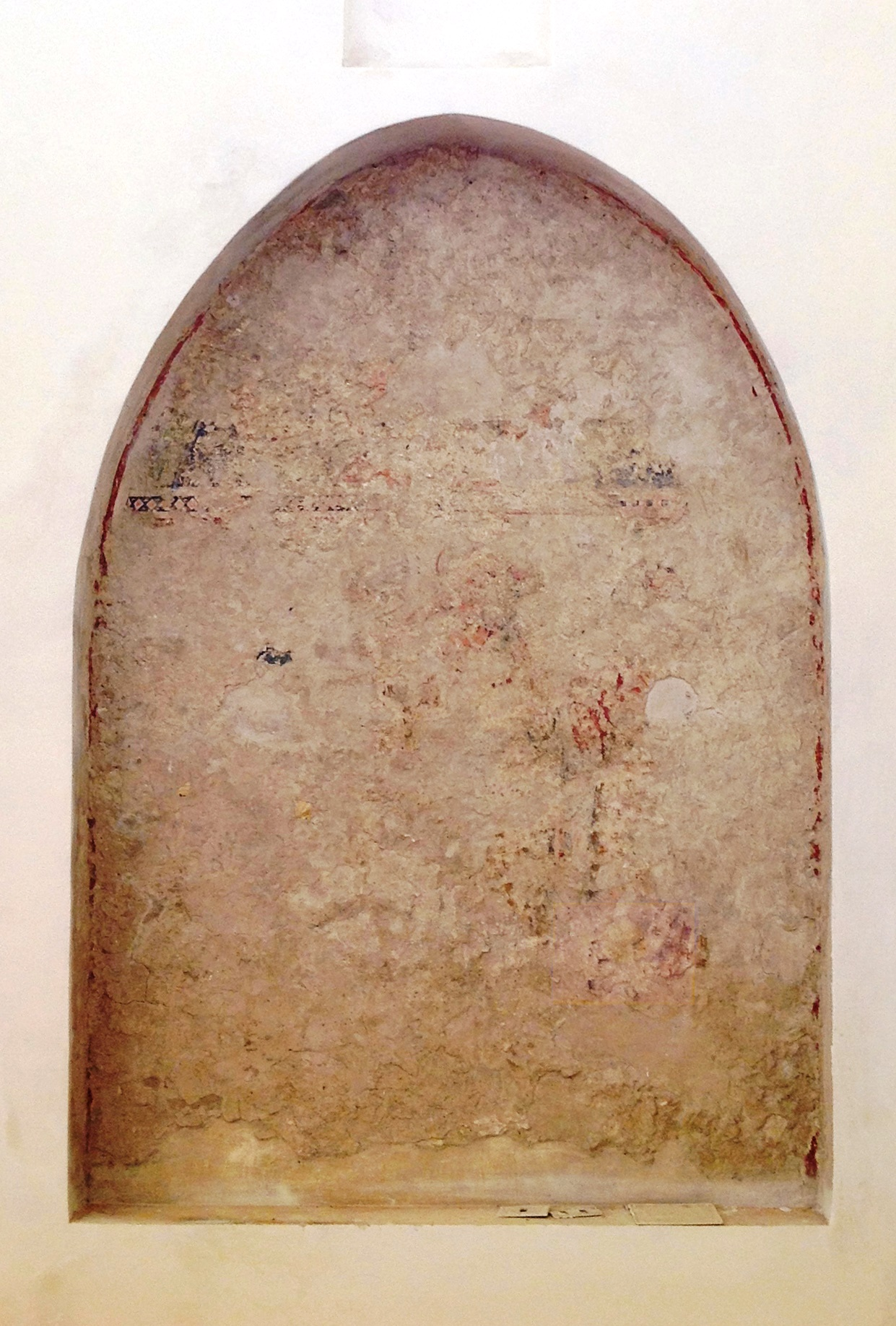
Frescoed niche with saints

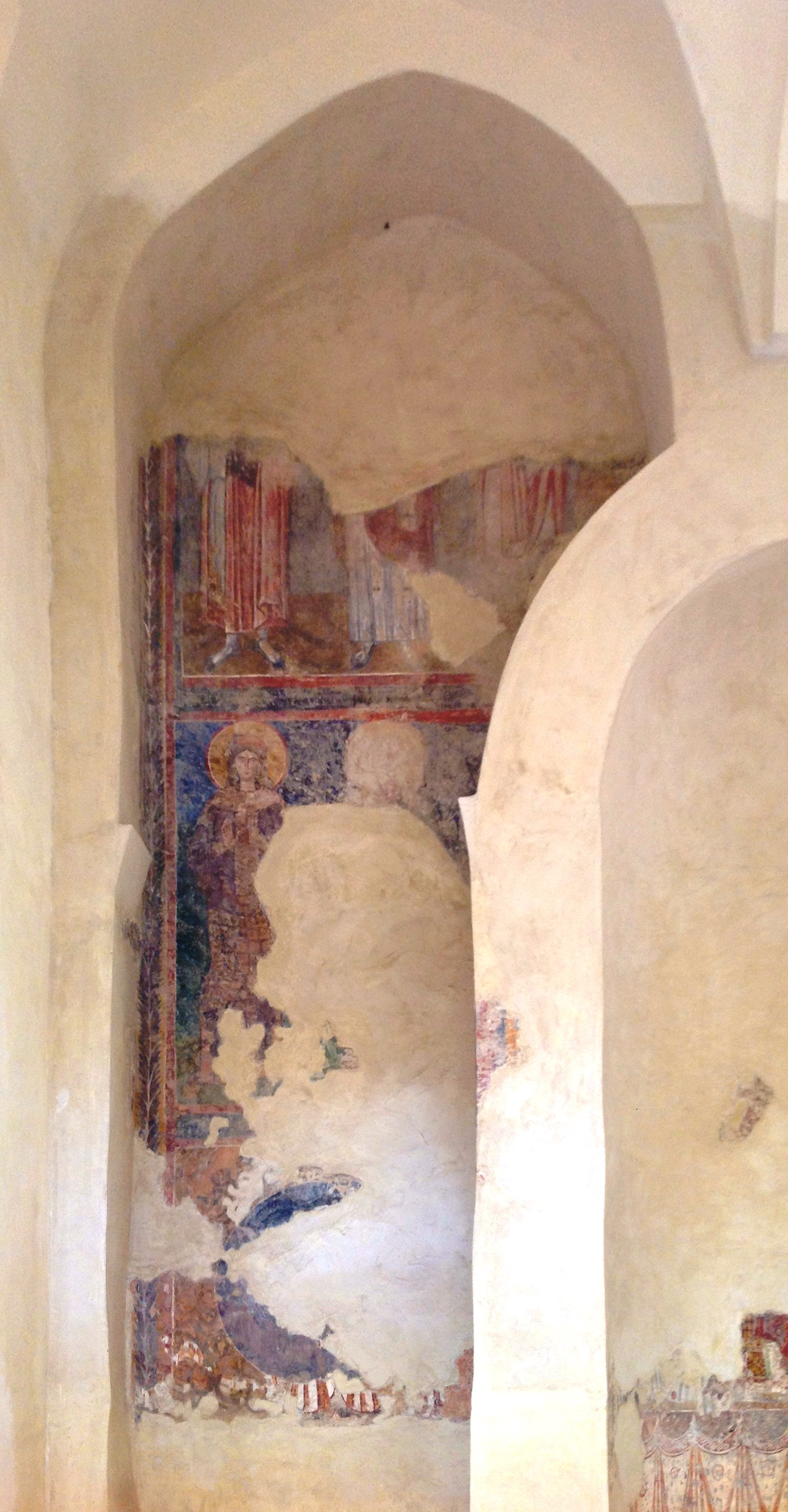
Saints (second half of the 11th century)

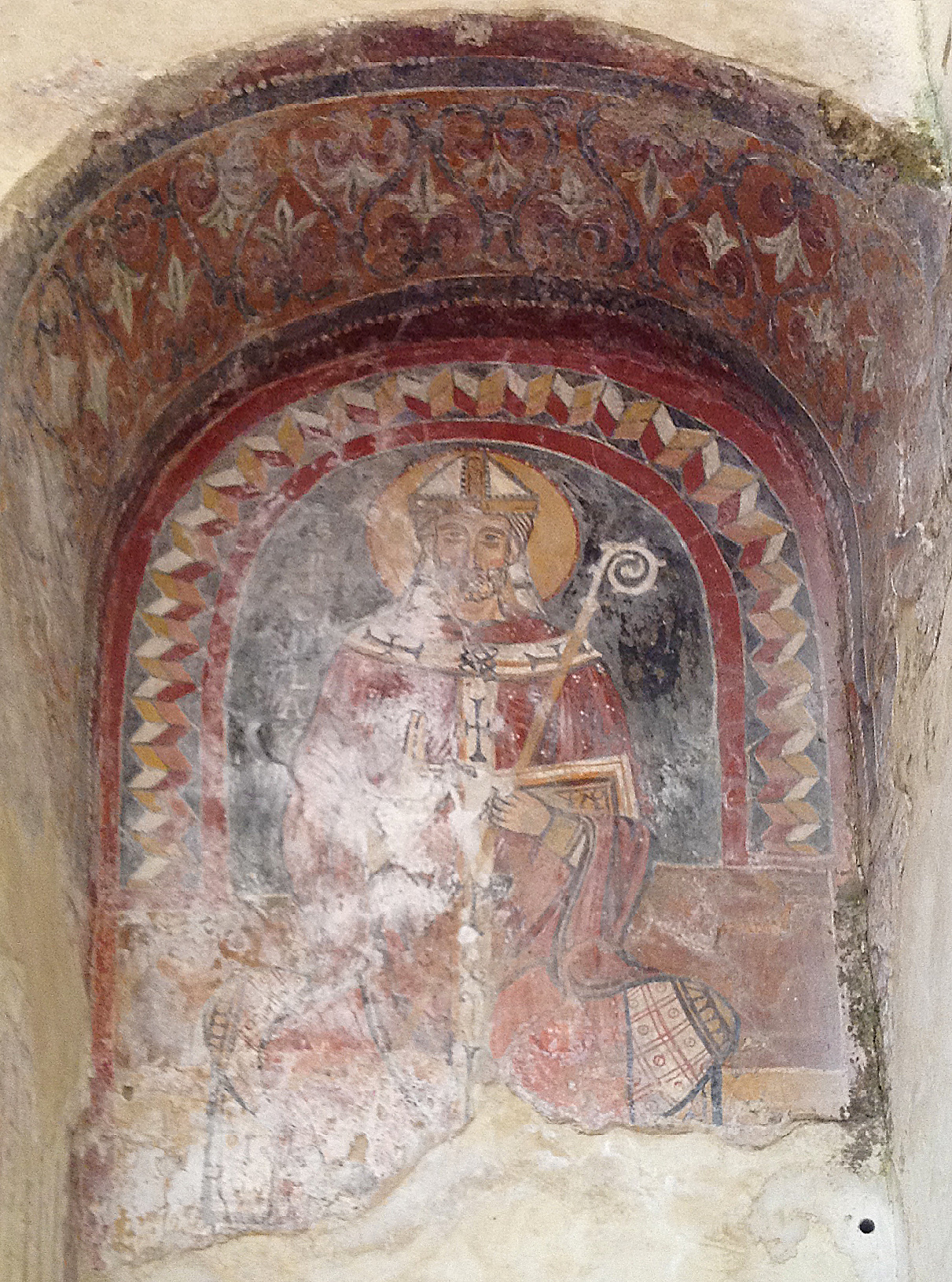
St. Nicholas (second half of the 13th century)

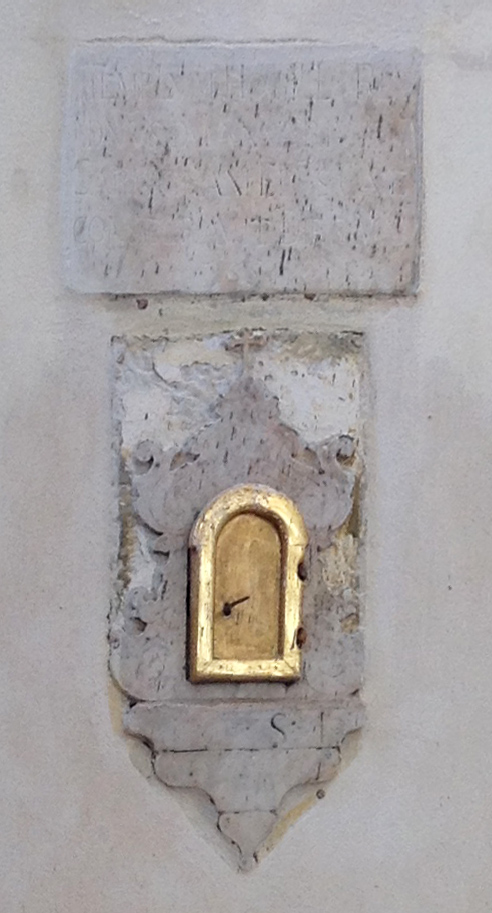
Tabernacle of holy oils and plaque from 1765

== See also ==
- Gaeta Cathedral

== Bibliography ==
- Demetrio Salazaro (1871). Studi sui monumenti della Italia meridionale dal IV.° al XIII.° secolo. Napoli: Morelli.
- Onorato Gaetani d'Aragona (1885). Memorie storiche della città di Gaeta (2 ed.). Caserta: Stabilimento tipo-litografico della Minerva.
- Ferraro, Salvatore (1903). Memorie religiose e civili della città di Gaeta. Napoli: Tipografia Francesco Giannini & Figli.
- Toesca, Pietro (1927). Storia dell'arte italiana. Il medioevo. Vol. II. Torino: UTET.
- Aletta, Nicola (1931). Gaeta. Guida storico-artistico-archeologica. Gaeta: Tipografia degli stabilimenti militari di pena.
- Fantasia, Pasquale (1932). Arte medioevale in Gaeta, con speciale riguardo al Candelabro del Cero Pasquale. Napoli: Tipografia Raffaele Contessa & Fratelli.
- Bessone Aureli, Maria Antonietta (1935). I marmorari romani. Milano, Genova, Roma: Dante Alighieri.
- Zeri, Federico (March 1950). "Il Maestro del 1456". Paragone/Arte (3). Firenze: Sansoni: 19–25. ISSN 0031-1650.
- Salvatore Aurigemma; Angelo De Santis (1955). Gaeta, Formia, Minturno. Roma: Istituto Poligrafico dello Stato.
- Luigi Salerno, ed. (1956). Il Museo Diocesano di Gaeta e mostra di opere restaurate nella provincia di Latina. Gaeta: Ente Provinciale per il Turismo di Latina.
- Zeri, Federico (September 1960). "Perché Giovanni da Gaeta e non Giovanni Sagitano". Paragone/Arte (129). Firenze: Sansoni: 19–25. ISSN 0031-1650.
- Codex Diplomaticus Cajetanus. Vol. II. Isola del Liri: Pisani. 1958 [1887].
- Codex Diplomaticus Cajetanus. Vol. III. Montecassino: Arcicenobio di Montecassino. 1958.
- Arnaldo Venditti (1967). Architettura bizantina nell'Italia meridionale: Campania - Calabria - Lucania. Vol. II. Napoli: Edizioni scientifiche italiane.
- Codex Diplomaticus Cajetanus. Vol. I. Isola del Liri: Pisani. 1969 [1887].
- Allaria, Giuseppe (1970). Le chiese di Gaeta. Latina: Ente Provinciale per il Turismo, Camera di Commercio.
- Fiengo, Giuseppe (1971). Gaeta: monumenti e storia urbanistica. Napoli: Edizioni scientifiche italiane.
- Marcello Di Marco; Franca Colozzo; Erasmo Vaudo (1972). Il campanile del duomo di Gaeta. Gaeta: Centro Storico Culturale.
- Giordano, Alberto (1972). La cattedra episcopale di Gaeta. Gaeta: Centro Storico Culturale.
- Maria Letizia Casanova, ed. (1976). Arte a Gaeta: dipinti dal XII al XVIII secolo. Firenze: Stiav.
- Salvatore Abita; Erasmo Vaudo; Ennio Albano; Giuliano Imondi, eds. (1977). La veduta di Gaeta nell'800 napoletano. Gaeta: La Poligrafica.
- Capobianco, Paolo (1979). Gaeta città di Maria: posuerunt me custodem. Gaeta: La Poligrafica.
- Scalesse, Tommaso (1979). "La chiesa di S. Domenico a Gaeta". Quaderni dell'Istituto di Storia dell'Architettura. 25. Roma: Istituto di Storia dell'Architettura: 79–90.
- Pier Giacomo Sottoriva, ed. (1985). Il golfo di Gaeta. Novara: Istituto Geografico De Agostini.
- D'Agnese Magliocca, Maria (November 1990). "Lo sfacelo di Santa Lucia". Gazzetta di Gaeta. 17 (11 (203)). Gaeta: La Poligrafica: 11–12.
- Nicola Magliocca (1994). Usi e costumi del popolo gaetano. Gaeta: Centro Storico Culturale "Gaeta".
- Gigliozzi, Maria Teresa (1995). Gaeta. Vol. VI. Roma: Istituto della Enciclopedia Italiana. pp. 439–442. BNI 97-11736.
- Ferrucco Lombardi (1996). Roma, le chiese scomparse. Roma: Fratelli Palombi. pp. 360–361.
- Mario Sanfilippo; Amedeo Pistolese (1997). Il patrimonio culturale di Gaeta: storia, arte, tradizioni. Vol. 4. Roma: Palombi.
- Cattabiani, Alfredo; Cepeda Fuentes, Marina (1998). Bestiario di Roma. Un insolito viaggio storico, artistico, archeologico alla riscoperta dei mitici e simbolici animali raffigurati in piazze, strade, monumenti e angoli nascosti della città. Roma: Newton Compton. ISBN 978-88-8183-317-7.
- Pinto, Rosario (1998). La pittura napoletana: storia delle opere e dei maestri dall'età antica ai nostri giorni. Napoli: Liguori.
- Fronzuto, Graziano (2001). Monumenti d'arte sacra a Gaeta: storia ed arte dei maggiori edifici religiosi di Gaeta. Gaeta: Edizioni del Comune di Gaeta.
- Angiolillo, Marialuisa (2004). Giovanni da Gaeta "magister caietanus". Roma: Edicom.
- Campone, Maria Carolina (2004). "Trasformazioni nel Regno borbonico tra neoclassicismo ed eclettismo: Luigi De Vegni e Giacomo Guarinelli". Trasformazioni Nel Regno Borbonico Tra Neoclassicismo ed Eclettismo: Luigi de Vegni e Giacomo Guarinelli. Napoli.
- Granata, Piergiorgio (2004). Gaeta: viaggio nell'arte: pittura, scultura e arti minori dal medioevo ad oggi. Napoli: Guida. ISBN 978-88-7188-745-6.
- Sebenico, Sara (2005). I mostri dell'Occidente medievale: fonti e diffusione di razze umane mostruose, ibridi ed animali fantastici. Trieste: Università degli studi di Trieste.
- Capobianco, Paolo (2006). La cattedrale di Gaeta. Cenni del 900º anniversario della consacrazione. Fondi: Arti Grafiche Kolbe.
- Gianandrea, Manuela (2006). "La scena del sacro. L'arredo liturgico del basso Lazio tra XI e XIV secolo". La Scena del Sacro. l'Arredo Liturgico del Basso Lazio Tra XI e XIV Secolo. Roma: Viella.
- Tallini, Gennaro (2006). Gaeta: una città nella storia. Gaeta: Edizioni del Comune di Gaeta.
- Salvatore Boni (2008). Gaeta nello splendore della sua nobiltà e i suoi governatori. Roma: Istituto Poligrafico dello Stato.
- Macaro, Carlo (2008). La Diocesi di Gaeta nel '700. Fondi: Tipolitografia C.O.R.E.
- Maria Teresa Longo; Edoardo Currà; Fabrizio Toppetti, eds. (2009). Oltre la tutela. 70 interventi al cuore dei Comuni. Roma: Palombi.
- Sorabella, Lino (2014). Ecclesia Mater. La Cattedrale di Gaeta. Marina di Minturno: Caramanica Editore.
- Mario d'Onofrio; Manuela Gianandrea, eds. (2018). Gaeta medievale e la sua cattedrale. Roma: Campisano.
