= Indiction =

Any of the years in a 15-year cycle used to date medieval documents throughout Europe

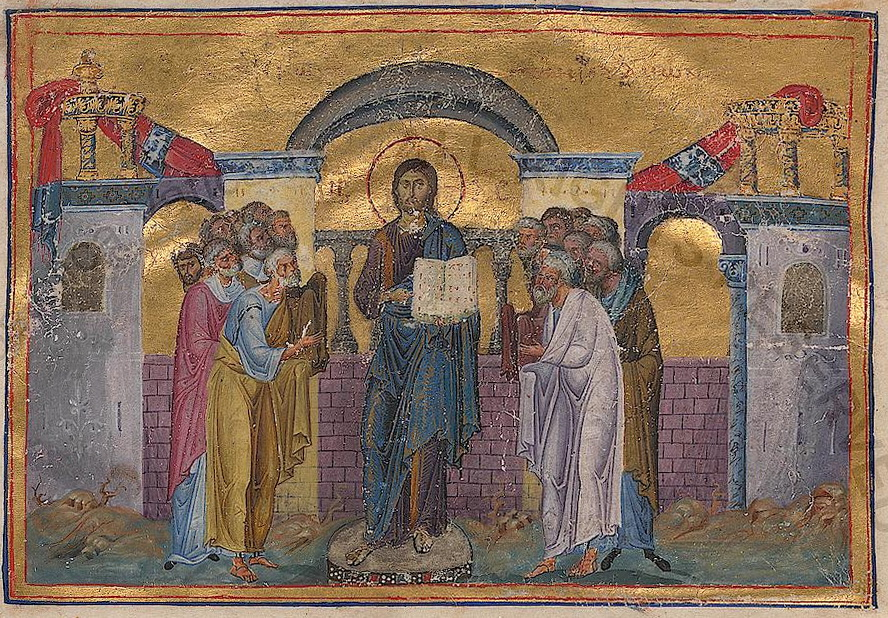
Miniature from Menologion of Basil II for September 1

An indiction (Latin: indictio, impost) was a periodic reassessment of taxation in the Roman Empire which took place every fifteen years. In Late Antiquity, this 15-year cycle began to be used to date documents and it continued to be used for this purpose in Medieval Europe, and can also refer to an individual year in the cycle; for example, "the fourth indiction" came to mean the fourth year of the current indiction. Since the cycles themselves were not numbered, other information is needed to identify the specific year.

== History ==
Indictions originally referred to the periodic reassessment for an agricultural or land tax in the Roman Empire. There were three different cycles: a 15-year cycle used throughout the empire; a 14-year cycle used in Roman Egypt; and a five year cycle called the lustrum, derived from the Roman Republican census. Changes to the tax system usually took place at the beginning of one of these cycles and at the end of the indiction Emperors often chose to forgive any arrears. The 15-year cycle can be traced in literary and epigraphic references to taxation reforms and the cancellation of arrears.

=== Principate ===
The Chronicon Paschale (c. 630 AD) claims that the 15-year cycle was instituted by Julius Caesar in 49 BC, which was also the first year of the Antiochene era, but there is no other evidence for this and, if the cycle were the same one known from later periods, the start date ought to be 48 BC. The earliest known event associated with the 15-year cycle is the establishment of a special board of three praetors to pursue arrears for the cycle ending in 42 AD, under Claudius. The beginning of the cycle in 58 AD coincides with a set of tax reforms and remissions instituted by Nero. Vespasian carried out a census of Italy at the start of the next indiction in 73 AD The indiction starting in 103 AD may coincide with the tax remission by Trajan depicted on the Plutei of Trajan. At the start of the next indiction in 118 AD, Hadrian wrote off 900,000,000 sesterces of tax arrears, which he refers to in an inscription as the largest remission ever granted. He again remitted arrears at the start of the next indiction in AD 133, as did Antoninus Pius at the start of the next indiction in 148 AD. Marcus Aurelius and Commodus carried out another remission at the start of the indiction beginning in 178 AD.

The 14-year cycle used in Egypt derived from the fact that liability for the Egyptian poll tax began at the age of fourteen, necessitating a new survey of the population every fourteen years. Tax reforms and remissions recorded in papyrus sources indicate that it was also in existence in the first century AD. The first evidence is an edict by Marcus Mettius Rufus, the Prefect of Egypt in AD 89, requiring property and loans to be registered. The next cycle in 103 AD coincides with reforms to record-keeping. The beginning of the cycle in 117 AD coincided with the 15-year cycle and was the occasion of Hadrian's large tax remission. This 14-year cycle is last attested in 257 AD. From 287 AD, at the latest, Roman Egypt used a system of 5-year cycles, then a non-cyclic series which reached number 26 by 318 AD.

=== Late Antiquity and Middle Ages ===
The 15-year cycle was introduced as a dating system on documents throughout the Roman empire by Constantine in 312 AD and it was in used in Egypt by 314 AD. The Chronicon Paschale (c. 630 AD) assigned its first year to 312–313 AD, whereas a Coptic document of 933 AD assigned its first year to 297–298 AD, one cycle earlier. Both of these were years of the Alexandrian calendar whose first day was Thoth 1 on August 29 in years preceding common Julian years and August 30 in years preceding leap years, hence each straddled two Julian years. The reason for beginning the year at that time was that the harvest would be in, and so it was an appropriate moment to calculate the taxes that should be paid.

The indiction was first used to date documents unrelated to tax collection in the mid-fourth century. By the late fourth century it was being used to date documents throughout the Mediterranean. In the Eastern Roman Empire outside of Egypt, the first day of its year was September 23, the birthday of Augustus. During the last half of the fifth century, probably 462 AD, this shifted to September 1, where it remained throughout the rest of the Byzantine Empire. In 537 AD, Justinian decreed that all dates must include the indiction via Novella 47, which eventually caused the Byzantine year to begin on September 1. But in the western Mediterranean, its first day was September 24 according to Bede, or the following December 25 or January 1, called the papal indiction. However, in the Rogitum for the Election of Pope Gregory VII, dated April 22, 1073, the date given is clearly the 11th moon of the 11th indiction (indictione et luna undecima), which requires that the papal year of indiction to have begun on August 31/Sept 1, 1072. An indictio Senensis beginning September 8 is sometimes mentioned.

The 7,980-year Julian Period was formed by multiplying the 15-year indiction cycle, the 28-year solar cycle and the 19-year Metonic cycle.

== Terminology ==
When the term "indiction" began to be used, it referred only to the full cycle, and individual years were referred to as being Year 1 of the indiction, Year 2 of the indiction, etc. It gradually became common to apply the term to the years themselves, which thus became the first indiction, the second indiction, and so on.

== Calculation ==
A useful chart providing all the equivalents can be found in Chaîne's book on chronology, and can easily be consulted online at the Internet Archive, from page 139 to page 146.

The Roman indiction for a modern Anno Domini year Y (January 1 to December 31) may be calculated as follows:

(Y + 3) mod 15

For example, the indiction for the year 2017 is 10:

(2017 + 3) mod 15 = 10

However, this formula will produce an error for the last year of an indiction, where the modulo value is 0 instead of the expected 15, as can be seen when applying it to the year 2022:

(2022+3) mod 15 = 0

One can simply read 0 as 15, but in order to have the correct result directly, the addition of a value of 1 from the offset may be delayed until after the mod operation:

(Y + 2) mod 15 + 1

That yields the expected answer, for 2022 again:

(2022+2) mod 15 + 1 = 15

== Works cited ==
- Bonnie Blackburn, Leofranc Holford-Strevens, The Oxford Companion to the year (Oxford, 1999), p. 769-71.
- "Calendars" in Astronomical Almanac for the Year 2017 (Washington: US Government Publishing Office, 2016) p. B4.
- Chronicon paschale 284–628 AD, trans. Michael Whitby, Mary Whitby (Liverpool, 1989), p. 10.
- Richard Duncan-Jones, Money and government in the Roman empire (Cambridge University Press, 1994) p. 59-63.
