= Lupercalia =

Ancient pastoral annual festival celebrated in the city of Rome on February 15th

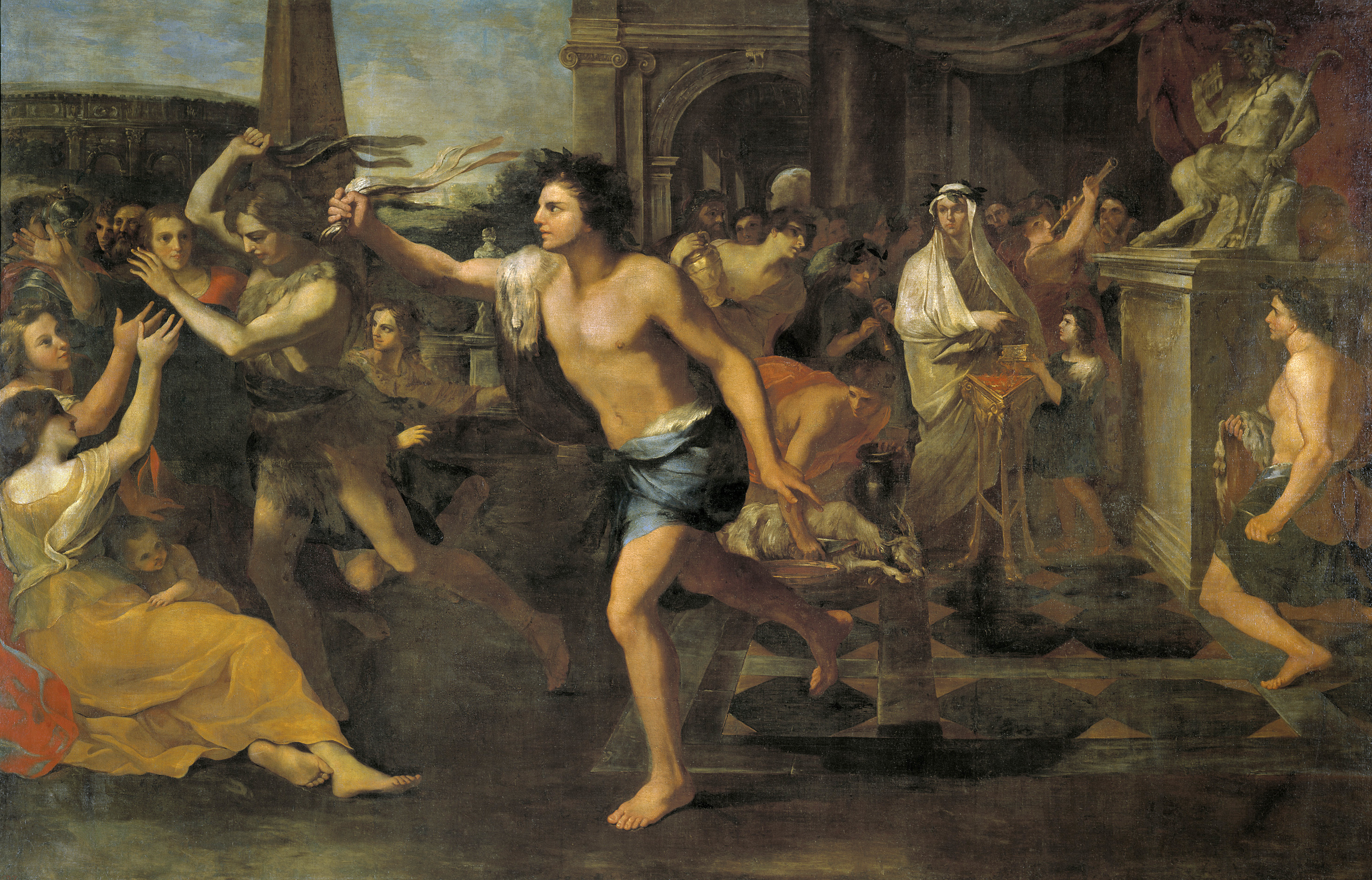
- Lupercalia, oil painting, circa 1635
- Observed by: Roman Kingdom; Roman Republic; Roman Empire; The Satanic Temple
- Type: Classical Roman religion
- Celebrations: Feasting
- Observances: Sacrifices of goats and a dog by the Luperci; offering of cakes by the Vestals; fertility rite in which the goatskin-clad Luperci strike women who wish to conceive
- Date: February 15

Lupercalia, also known as Lupercal, was a pastoral festival of Ancient Rome observed annually on February 15 to purify the city, promoting health and fertility. Lupercalia was also known as dies Februatus, after the purification instruments called februa, for which the month Februarius was named.

== Name ==
The festival was originally known as Februa ("Purifications" or "Purgings") after the februum used on the day. It was also known as Februatus and gave its name variously as epithet to Juno Februalis, Februlis, or Februata in her role as that month's patron deity; to a supposed purification deity called Februus; (Note: The deity Februus is almost certainly a later invention.) and to February (mensis Februarius), the month during which the festival occurred. Ovid connects februare to an Etruscan word for purging.

The name Lupercalia was believed in antiquity to have some connection to the Ancient Greek festival of the Arcadian Lykaia, a wolf festival (Ancient Greek: λύκος, lýkos; Latin: lupus), and the worship of Lycaean Pan, assumed to be a Greek equivalent to Faunus, as instituted by Evander. Justin describes a cult image of "the Lycaean god, whom the Greeks call Pan and the Romans Lupercus", as nude, save for a goatskin girdle. The worship of Lupercus originated in the Augustan period, leaving the question open as to which god the Luperci were considered to honour before this point.

The statue stood in the Lupercal, the cave where tradition held that Romulus and Remus were suckled by the she-wolf (Lupa). The cave lay at the foot of the Palatine Hill, on which Romulus was thought to have founded Rome. The name of the festival likely derives from lupus, 'wolf', though both the etymology and its significance are obscure. The wolf appellation may have to do with the key role an animal predator plays in male rites of passage.

== Rites ==
=== Locations ===
The rites were confined to the Lupercal cave, the Palatine Hill, and the Forum, all central locations in Rome's foundation myth. Near the cave stood a sanctuary of Rumina, goddess of breastfeeding; and the wild fig tree (Ficus Ruminalis) to which Romulus and Remus were brought by the divine intervention of the river god Tiberinus; some Roman sources name the wild fig tree caprificus, literally "goat fig". Like the cultivated fig, its fruit is pendulous, and the tree exudes a milky sap if cut, making it apt for a cult of breastfeeding.

=== Priesthoods ===
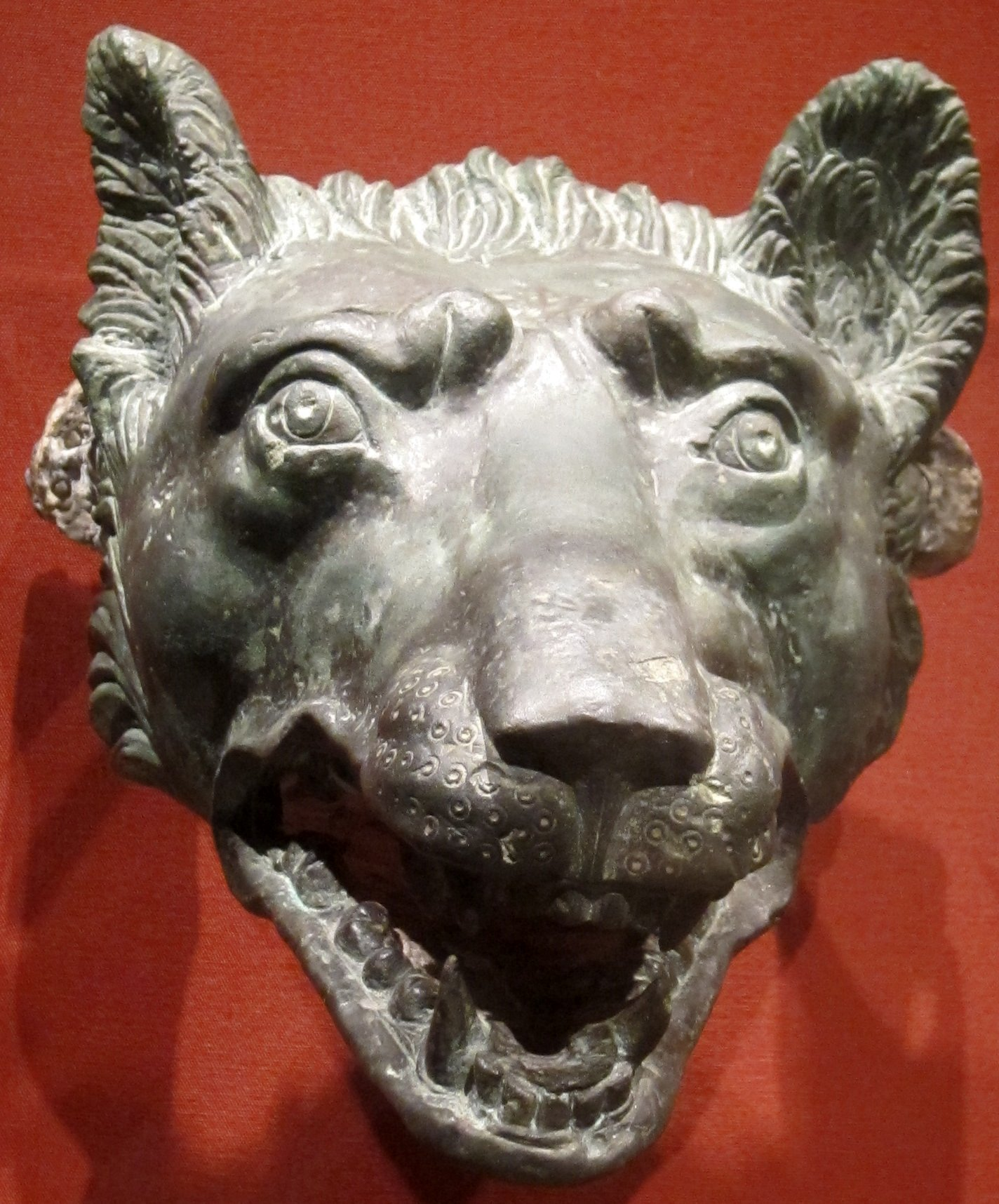
Bronze wolf's head, 1st century AD. Lupercalia most likely derives from lupus, 'wolf', though both the etymology and its significance are obscure.

The Lupercalia had its own priesthood, the Luperci ("brothers of the wolf"), whose institution and rites were attributed either to the Arcadian culture-hero Evander or to Romulus and Remus, erstwhile shepherds who had each established a group of followers. The Luperci were young men (iuvenes), usually between the ages of 20 and 40. They formed two religious collegia (associations) based on ancestry—the Quinctiliani (named after the gens Quinctia) and the Fabiani (named after the gens Fabia). Each college was headed by a magister.

In 44 BC, a third college, the Juliani, was instituted in honor of Julius Caesar; its first magister was Mark Antony. The college of Juliani disbanded or lapsed after Caesar's assassination and was not reestablished in the reforms of his successor, Augustus. In the Imperial era, membership of the two traditional collegia was opened to iuvenes of equestrian status.

=== Sacrifice and fertility rites ===
At the Lupercal altar, a male goat (or goats) and a dog were sacrificed by one or another of the Luperci under the supervision of the Flamen dialis, Jupiter's chief priest. (Note: One of Plutarch's Roman Questions was "68. Why do the Luperci sacrifice a dog?"... [Because] "nearly all the Greeks used a dog as the sacrificial victim for ceremonies of purification; and some, at least, make use of it even to this day. They bring forth for Hecate puppies along with the other materials for purification.") An offering was also made of salted mealcakes, prepared by the Vestal Virgins. After the blood sacrifice, two Luperci approached the altar. Their foreheads were anointed with blood from the sacrificial knife, then wiped clean with wool soaked in milk, after which they were expected to laugh.

The sacrificial feast followed, after which the Luperci cut thongs (known as februa) from the flayed skin of the animal, and ran with them, naked or near-naked, along the old Palatine boundary, counterclockwise around the hill. In Plutarch's description of the Lupercalia, written during the early Roman Empire,

many of the noble youths and of the magistrates run up and down through the city naked, for sport and laughter striking those they meet with shaggy thongs. And many women of rank also purposely get in their way, and like children at school present their hands to be struck, believing that the pregnant will thus be helped in delivery, and the barren to pregnancy.

After completing their circuit of the Palatine, the Luperci returned to the cave.

== History ==
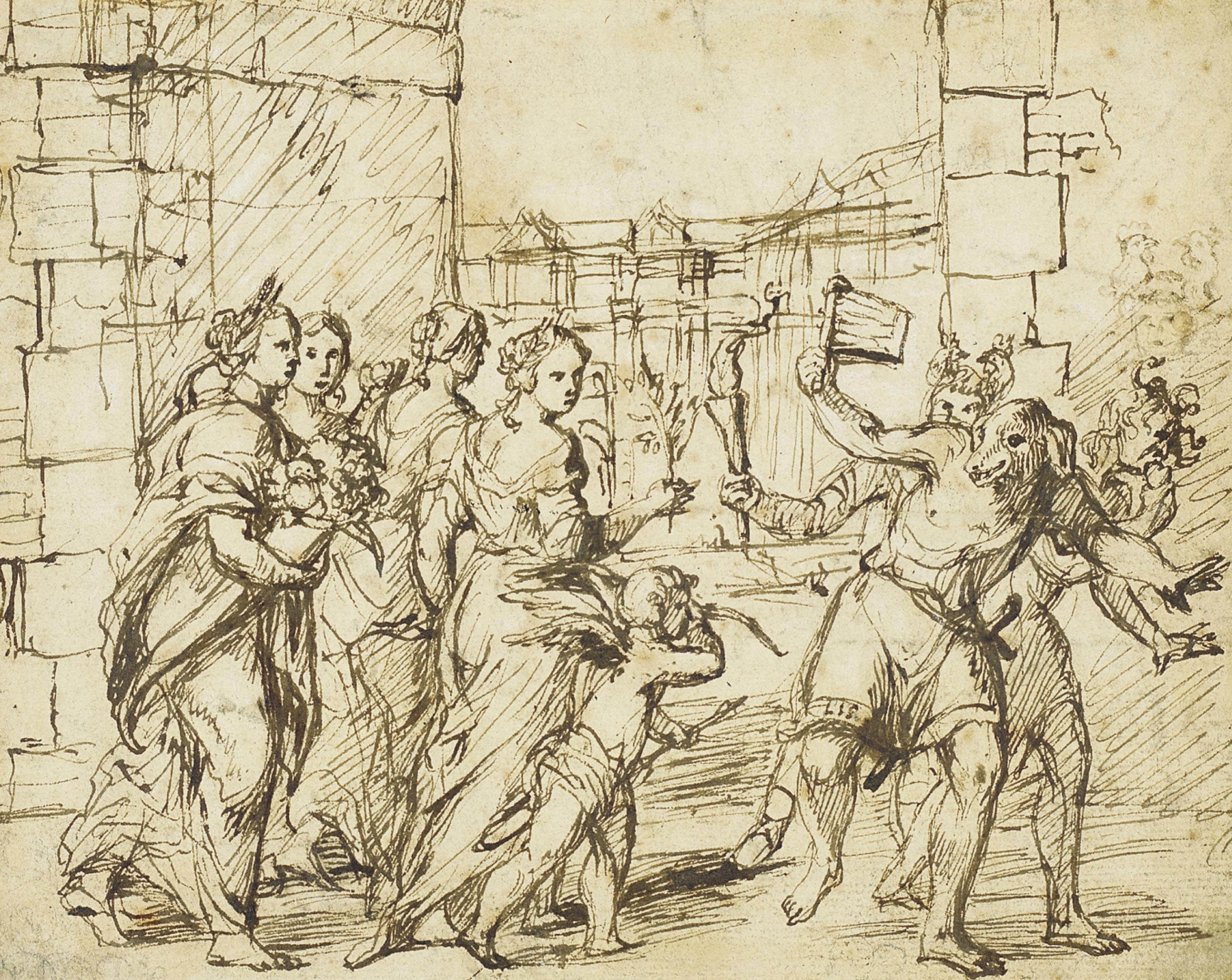
The Lupercalian Festival in Rome (c. 1578–1610), drawing by the circle of Adam Elsheimer, showing the Luperci dressed as dogs and goats, with Cupid and personifications of fertility

The Februa was of ancient and possibly Sabine origin. After February was added to the Roman calendar, Februa occurred on its 15th day (a.d. XV Kal. Mart.). Of its various rituals, the most important came to be those of the Lupercalia. The Romans attributed the instigation of the Lupercalia to Evander, a culture hero from Arcadia who was credited with bringing the Olympic pantheon and Greek laws and alphabet to Italy, where he founded the city of Pallantium on the future site of Rome, 60 years before the Trojan War.

Lupercalia was celebrated in parts of Italy; Luperci are attested by inscriptions at Velitrae, Praeneste, Nemausus (modern Nîmes) and elsewhere. The ancient cult of the Hirpi Sorani ("wolves of Soranus", from Sabine hirpus "wolf"), who practiced at Monte Soratte, 45 km (28 mi) north of Rome, had elements in common with Lupercalia.

Descriptions of the Lupercalia festival of 44 BC attest to its continuity. During the festival, Julius Caesar publicly refused a golden crown Mark Antony offered him. The Lupercal cave was restored or rebuilt by Augustus, and has been speculated to be identical with a grotto discovered in 2007, 50 feet (15 m) below the remains of Augustus's residence, but according to scholarly consensus, the grotto is a nymphaeum, not the Lupercal. Lupercalia is marked on a calendar of 354 alongside traditional and Christian festivals.

Despite the banning in 391 of all non-Christian cults and festivals, Lupercalia was still celebrated by the nominally Christian populace into the reign of emperor Anastasius I Dicorus. Pope Gelasius I said only "vile rabble" were involved in the festival and sought its forceful abolition; the Roman Senate protested that Lupercalia was essential to Rome's safety and well-being. This prompted Gelasius's scornful suggestion: "If you assert that this rite has salutary force, celebrate it yourselves in the ancestral fashion; run nude yourselves that you may properly carry out the mockery."

No contemporary evidence supports the popular notions that Gelasius abolished Lupercalia, or that he or any other prelate replaced it with the Feast of the Purification of the Blessed Virgin Mary. A literary association between Lupercalia and the romantic elements of Saint Valentine's Day dates to Chaucer and poetic traditions of courtly love.

== Legacy ==
Caesar Refuses the Diadem (1894), when it was offered by Mark Antony during the Lupercalia

Horace's Ode III, 18 alludes to the Lupercalia. The festival or its associated rituals gave its name to the Roman month of February (mensis Februarius) and thence to the modern month. The Roman god Februus personified both the month and purification, but seems to postdate both.

William Shakespeare's play Julius Caesar begins during Lupercalia. Caesar tells Mark Antony to strike Calpurnia, in the hope that she will be able to conceive.

Research published in 2019 suggests that the word Leprechaun derives from Lupercus.

Patrick Wolf's fifth album was titled Lupercalia in honour of the festival.
