= Pluteus (sculpture) =

In architecture and sculpture, a pluteus (plural plutei) is a balustrade made up of massive rectangular slabs of wood, stone or metal, which divides part of a building in half; in a church they fulfil the same function as an iconostasis or rood screen, separating the nave from the chancel. They are decorated with frames in relief or richly decorated with figures or geometric motifs.

One set of examples is the so-called Plutei of Trajan, discovered between the Comitium and the Column of Phocas in the Roman Forum in 1872 and another is the Plutei of Theodota.

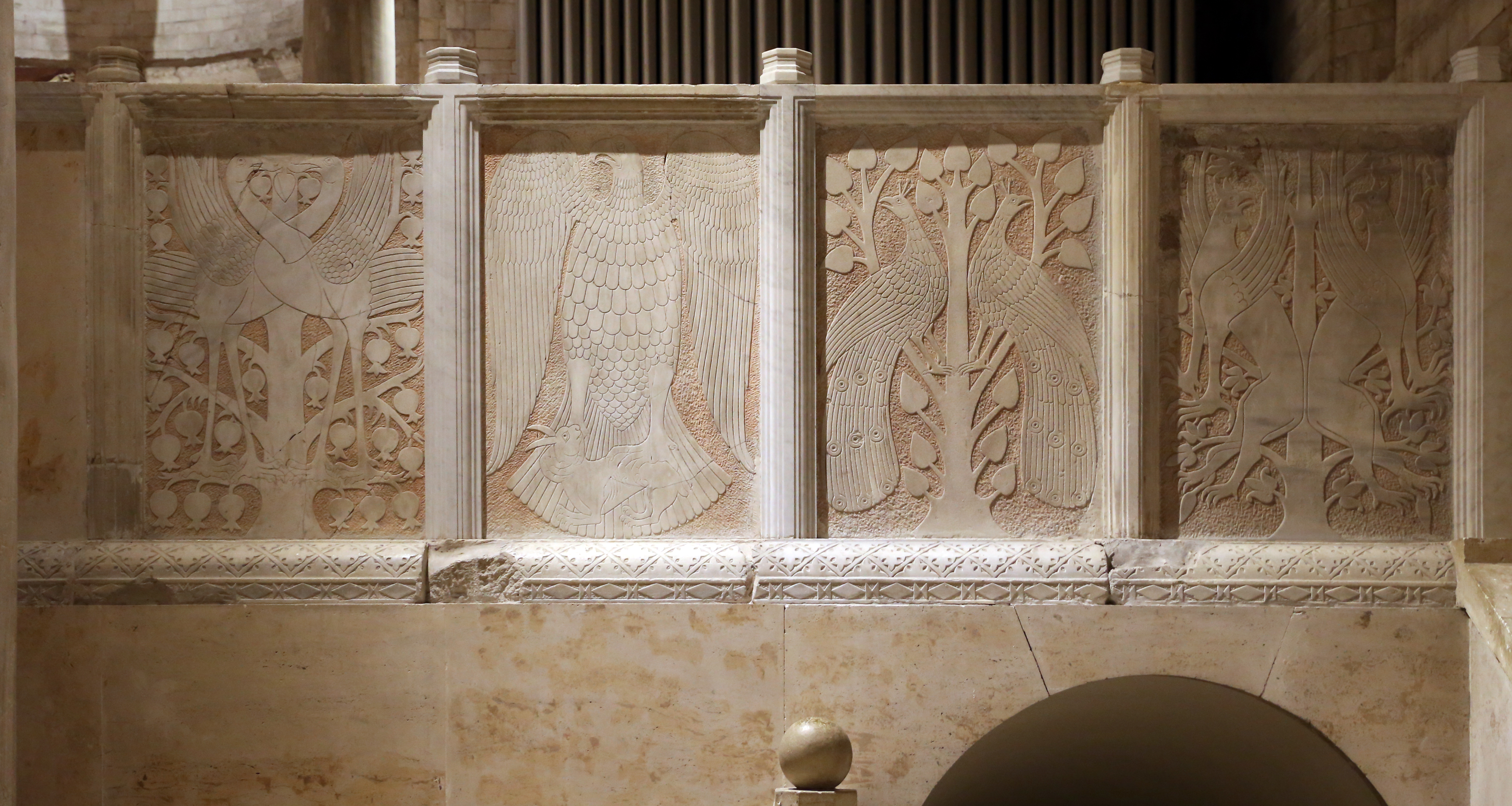
Pluteus in Ancona Cathedral

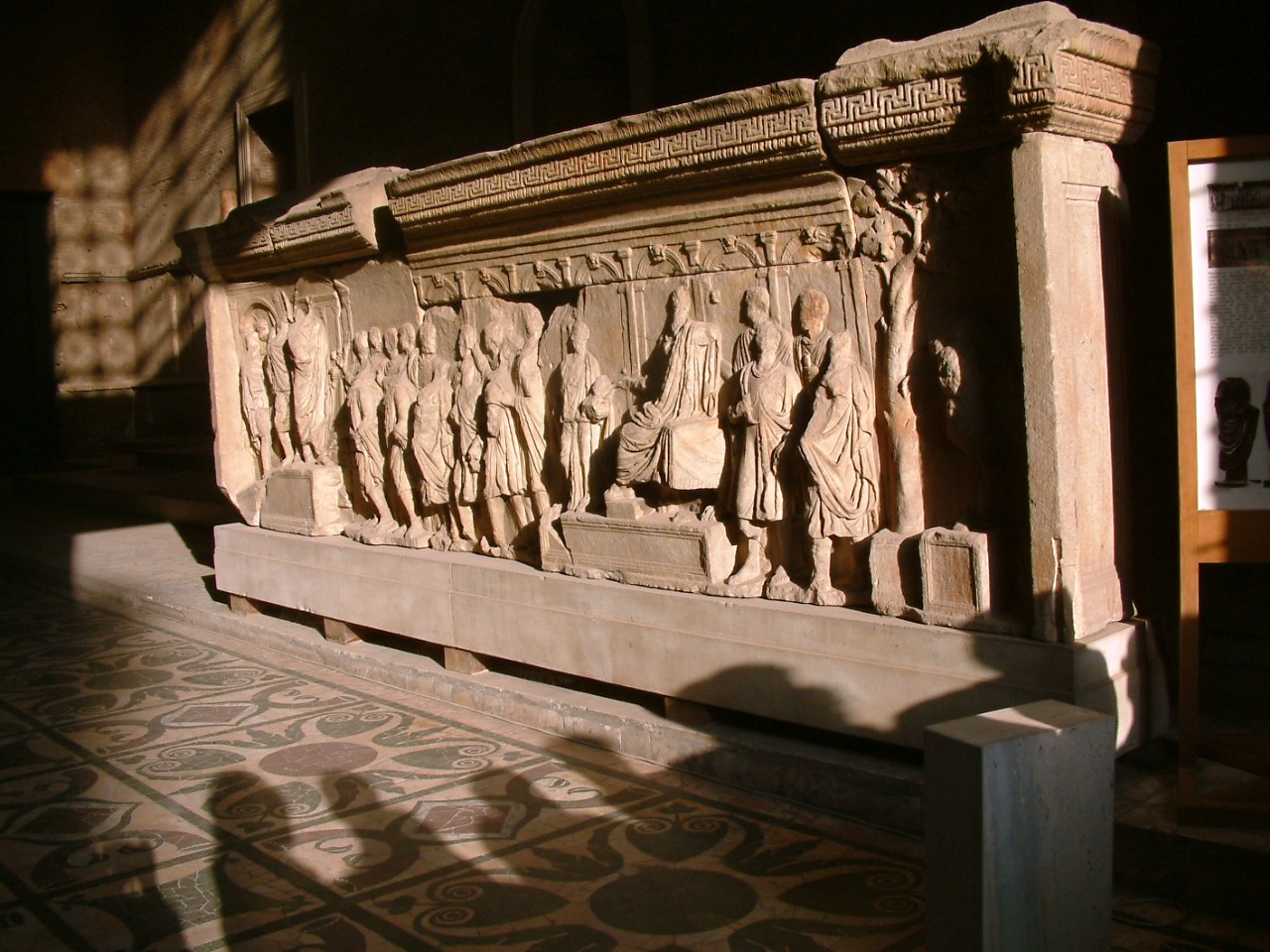
Plutei of Trajan
