= Lupercus (mythology) =

Roman deity

Lupercus or Lubercus or Luberkus was a god in Roman mythology. Lupercus was a protector of the farmers, harvesting and packs of wild animals. Every year on 15 February in honor of him, the Romans held the Lupercalia. He was an ancient Italian god, worshipped by shepherds as the promoter of fertility in sheep and protector of flocks.

His sanctuary was the Lupercal, where she-wolf took care of Romulus and Remus; this is why Lupercalia was a celebration that helped pregnant women.

Lupercus is sometimes identified with the god Pan in Greek mythology. The Roman god Faunus is a variation of Lupercus, also linked to the festival of Lupercalia.
