= Irene Iacopi =

Italian archaeologist

Irene Iacopi is an Italian archaeologist. In 2007 she announced she had found what was probably the legendary cave of Lupercal beneath the remains of the House of Augustus, the Domus Livia, on the Palatine Hill, believed by ancient Romans to be the cave where the twin boys Romulus and Remus were suckled by a she-wolf. Iacopi has published several books, most recently on the Domus Aurea and on wall paintings in the House of Augustus.

== Domus Livia discovery ==
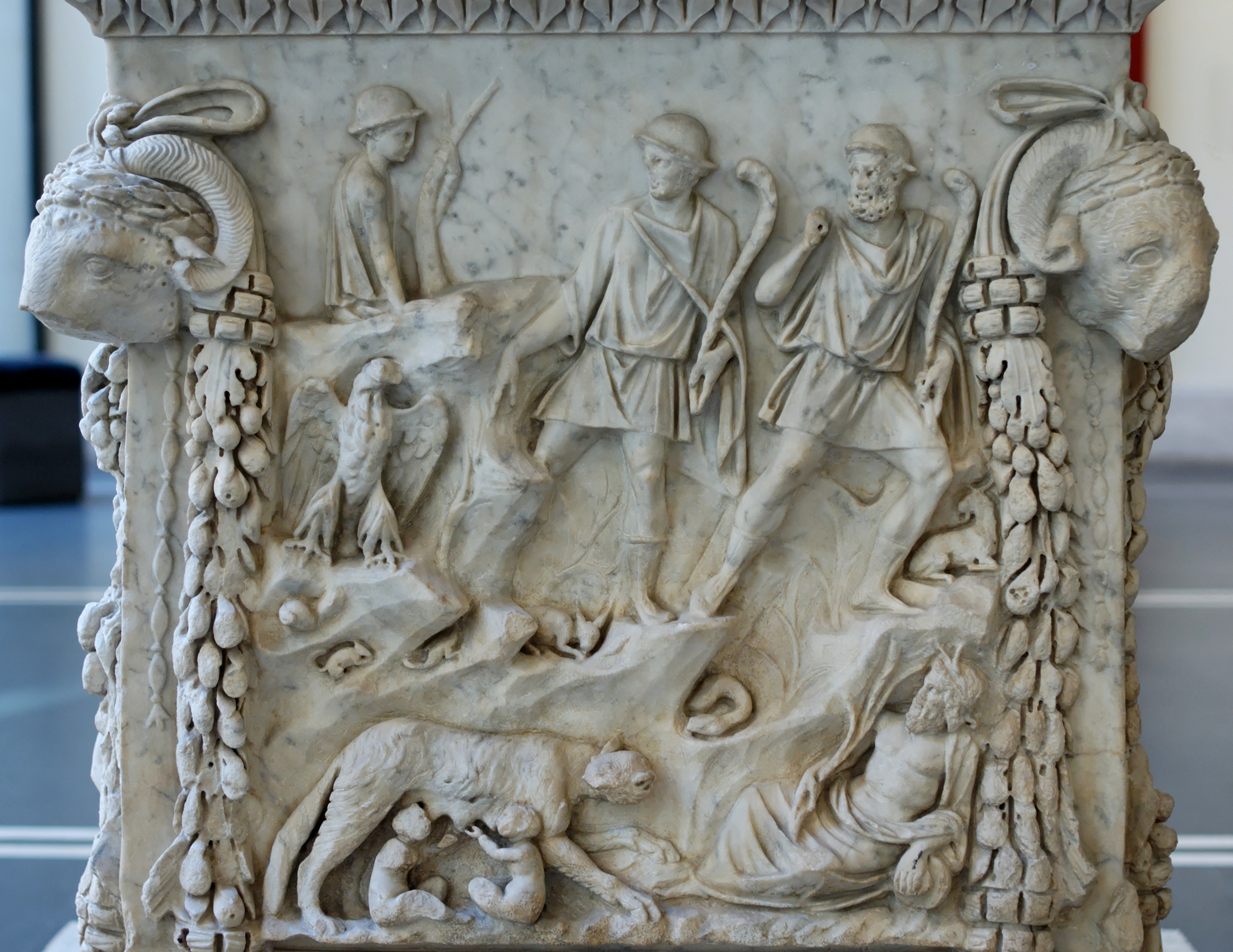
Representation of the lupercal: Romulus and Remus fed by the she-wolf, Lupa, surrounded by representations of the Tiber and the Palatine. Panel from an altar dedicated to the divine couple of Mars and Venus. Marble, Roman artwork of the end of the reign of Trajan (98-117 CE), later re-used under the Hadrianic era (117-132 CE) as a base for a statue of Silvan. From the portico of the Piazzale dei Corporazioni in Ostia Antica.

In January 2007, Iacopi announced that she had probably found the legendary cave of Lupercal beneath the remains of the House of Augustus, the Domus Livia, on the Palatine Hill, believed by ancient Romans to be the cave where the twin boys Romulus and Remus were suckled by a she-wolf. Andrea Carandini, a professor of archaeology specialising in ancient Rome, described it as "one of the most important discoveries of all time".

These assertions have proved controversial. Adriano La Regina (formerly Rome's archaeological superintendent 1976–2004, professor of Etruscology at Sapienza University of Rome), Professor Fausto Zevi (professor of Roman Archaeology at Rome's La Sapienza University) and Professor Henner von Hesberg (head of the German Archaeological Institute, Rome) denied the identification of the grotto with Lupercal on topographic and stylistic grounds. They concluded that the grotto is actually a nymphaeum or underground triclinium from Neronian times. The current scholarly consensus is that the grotto is not the Lupercal and that the cave was located lower southwest, closer to piazza Sant'Anastasia al Palatino.

== Selected publications ==
- L'Antiquarium forense (Itinerari dei musei, gallerie e monumenti d'Italia) Istituto Poligrafico dello Stato (1974)
- Gli scavi sul colle Palatino: Testimonianze e documenti Electa (1997) ISBN 978-8843563302
- La decorazione pittorica dell'aula isiaca Electa (1997) ISBN 978-8843563296
- Domus Aurea Electa (1999) ISBN 978-8843571741
- The House of Augustus: Wall Paintings Electa (2008) ISBN 978-8837064389
