= Lupercal =

Cave at the foot of the Palatine Hill in Rome

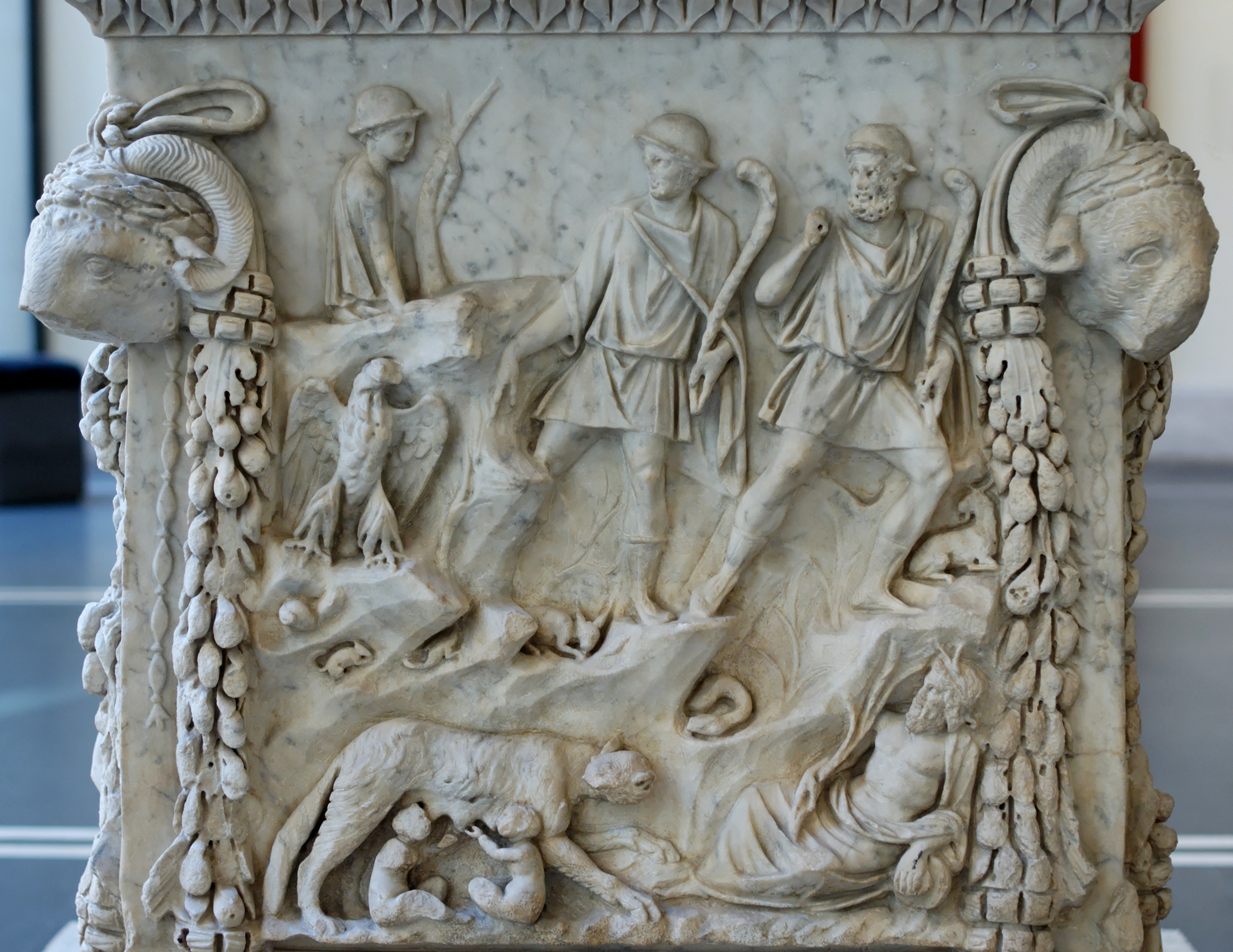
- First-century Roman sculpture in relief depicting the Roman foundation myth. Romulus and Remus are shown being suckled by a she-wolf in the Lupercal (bottom left).
- Click on the map for a fullscreen view
- Location: Palatine Hill in Rome
- Coordinates: 41°53′17″N 12°29′04″E
- Depth: 15m
- Discovery: January 2007

The Lupercal (from Latin lupa "female wolf") was a cave at the southwest foot of the Palatine Hill in Rome, located somewhere between the temple of Magna Mater and the Sant'Anastasia al Palatino. In the legend of the founding of Rome, Romulus and Remus were found there by the she-wolf who suckled them until they were rescued by the shepherd Faustulus. Luperci, the priests of Faunus, celebrated certain ceremonies of the Lupercalia at the cave, from the earliest days of the City until at least 494 AD.

== Modern discovery ==
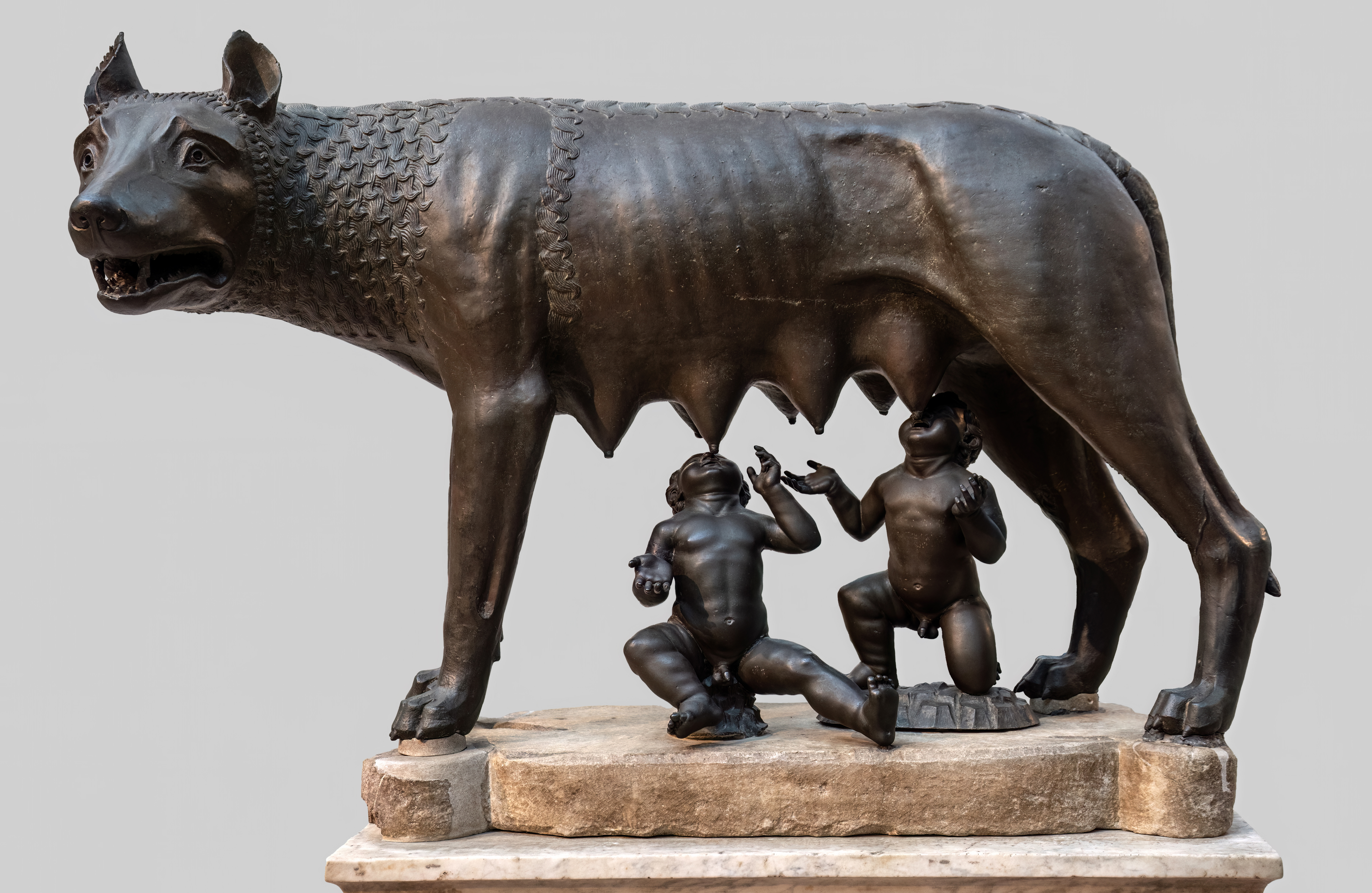
Lupa Capitolina ("The Capitoline Wolf"): the she-wolf is of unknown origin, the suckling twins were added c. 1500.

In January 2007, Italian archaeologist Irene Iacopi announced that she had probably found the legendary cave beneath the remains of Emperor Augustus's house, the Domus Livia, on the Palatine. Archaeologists came across the 15-meter-deep cavity while working to restore the decaying palace.

On 20 November 2007, the first set of photos were released showing the vault of the grotto which is encrusted with colourful mosaics, pumice stones and seashells. The center of the ceiling features a depiction of a white eagle, the symbol of the Roman Empire. Archaeologists had not yet found the grotto's entrance, so they continued looking.

The cave beneath the Domus Livia on the Palatine Hill. The photo was taken with a probe.

Its location below Augustus' residence was thought to be significant; Octavian, before he became Augustus, had considered taking the name Romulus to indicate that he intended to found Rome anew.

=== Opposing opinions ===
Adriano La Regina (formerly Rome's archaeological superintendent 1976–2004, professor of Etruscology at Sapienza University of Rome), Professor Fausto Zevi (professor of Roman Archaeology at Rome's La Sapienza University) and Professor Henner von Hesberg (head of the German Archaeological Institute, Rome) denied the identification of the grotto with Lupercal on topographic and stylistic grounds. They concluded that the grotto is actually a nymphaeum or underground triclinium from Neronian times. The current scholarly consensus is that the grotto is not the Lupercal and that the cave was located lower southwest, closer to piazza Sant'Anastasia al Palatino.

== See also ==
- Casa Romuli

Preceded by Largo di Torre Argentina	Landmarks of Rome; Lupercal	Succeeded by Pantheon
