= She-wolf (Roman mythology) =

Roman mythological creature

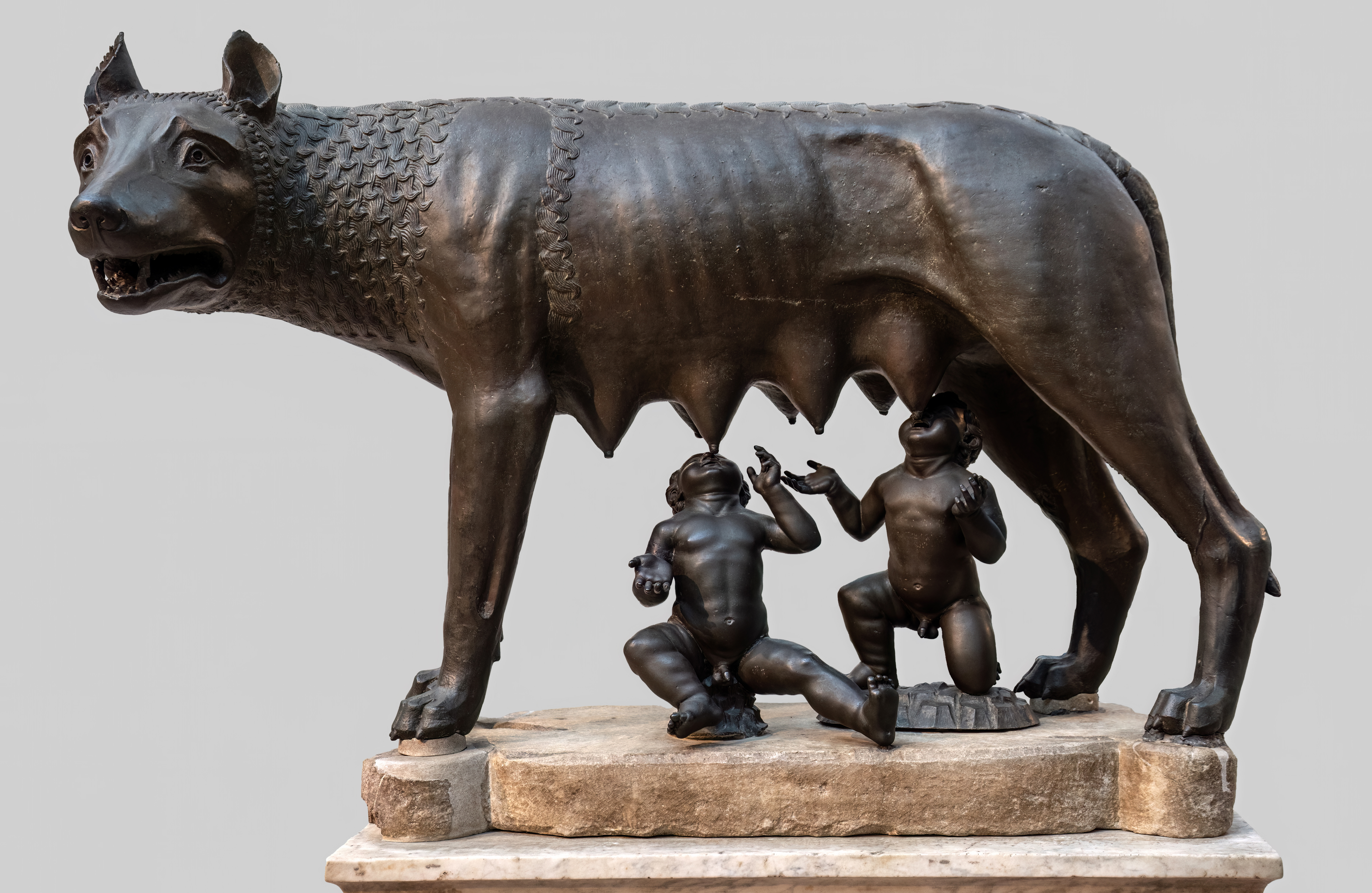
The Capitoline Wolf, arguably the most famous statue of the she-wolf.

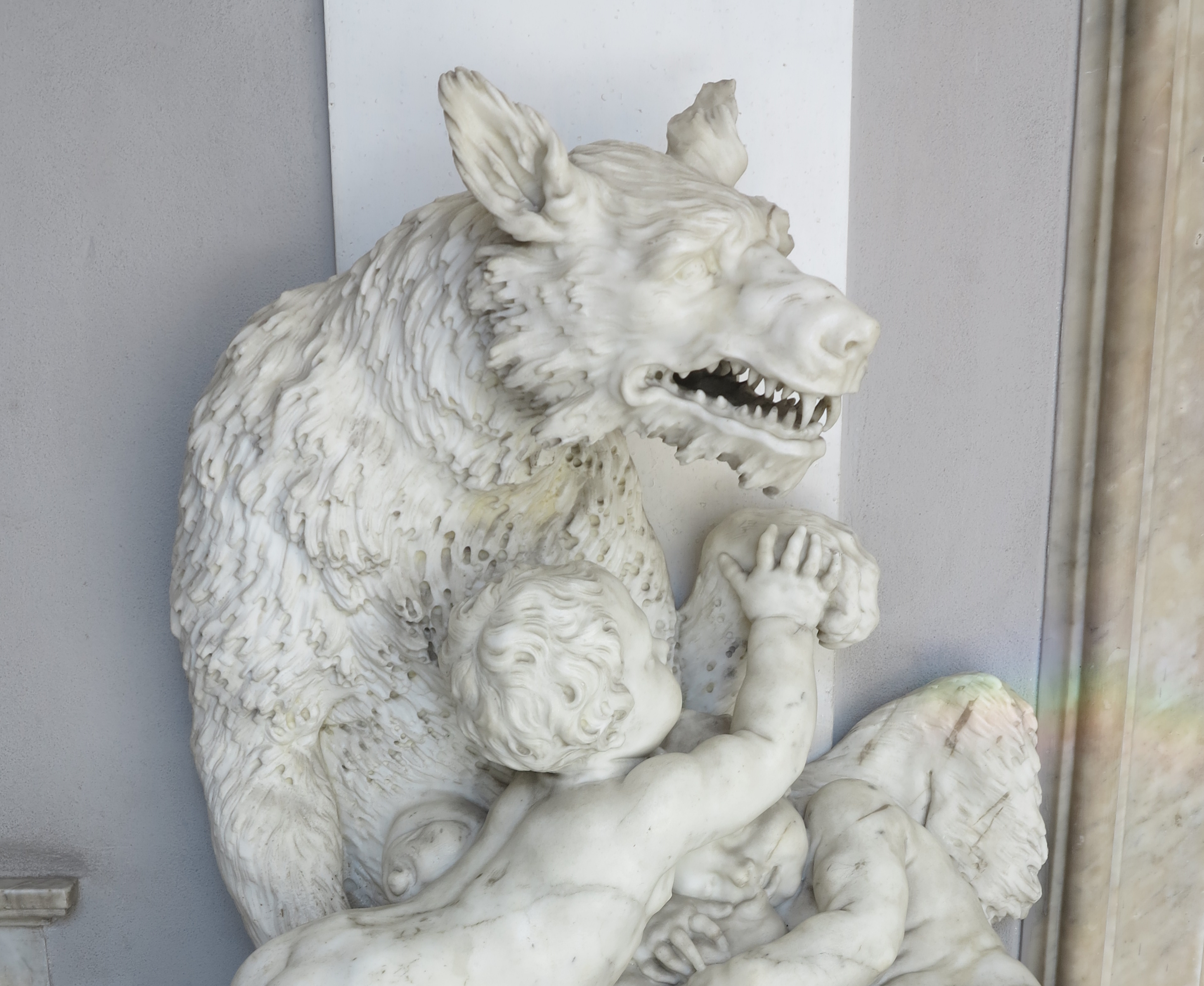
The she-wolf with Romulus and Remus, sculpture by Francesco Biggi and Domenico Parodi in the Palazzo Rosso of Genoa, Italy

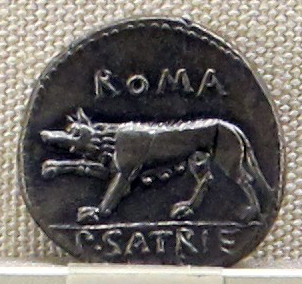
The she-wolf on a coin of the late Roman republic (c.77 BC)

In the Roman foundation myth, the she-wolf (lupa in Latin) was an Italian wolf who nursed and sheltered the twins Romulus and Remus after they were abandoned in the wild by decree of King Amulius of Alba Longa. She cared for the infants at her den, a cave known as the Lupercal, until they were discovered by a shepherd, Faustulus. Romulus would later become the founder and first king of Rome and both twins became famous throughout history as the founders of the Rome known today. The image of the she-wolf suckling the twins has been a symbol of Rome since ancient times and is one of the most recognizable icons of ancient mythology.

== Origins ==
Some scholars have argued that the she-wolf myth owes its origins to the early Etrusco-Italic indigenous influences just as much as the Ancient Greeks. They suggest that because wolves were the only major threat to the community in the northern Mediterranean area, they naturally translated this fear into superstitious awe and admiration of the power of wolves. Additionally, the adoption of the myth may have arisen from the commercial ties between the Etruscan cities, Tarquinii and Miletus. One legend claims that the Hirpini people were so-called because, when they set out to find their first colony, they were led to its location by a wolf (from the Osco-Umbrian word for wolf: hirpus). The tale of the Lupercal is central to that of the twins, and probably predates theirs. To the Roman god Mars, the wolf is a sacred animal. There is an ongoing debate about a connection to the ancient Roman festival of the Lupercalia.

In Greek mythology, Apollo's mother Leto is reported to have given birth to him as a she-wolf, to evade Hera.

== Literary sources ==
The three "canonical" versions of the myth—those of Livy, Plutarch and Dionysius of Halicarnassus—all draw heavily on Quintus Fabius Pictor. He is considered one of Rome's earliest historians and his now lost work describes the she-wolf and her episode with the twins. The twins were abandoned at the order of Amulius. Some tales claim that they were to be left along the riverbank, others that they were to be cast into the water. The servant charged with the task either thought better of it, or could not get close enough to do the deed because of the flooding. Instead, he left them in the standing water that had formed at the foot of Palatine Hill. The twins were found either after their basket had been left at the foot of the fig tree, or came to rest there after floating in the water. In each case, the she-wolf rescued them and gently cared for them in or near the Lupercal. Later, they were discovered by local shepherds.

Dionysius reports that the rains had raised the water so much so that Amulius' servant had to abandon the twins, before the intended spot (where the current was stronger). The basket, containing the twins, gently went with the receding water until it struck a stone, flipping the twins and the basket into the mud. The she-wolf then arrived and lowered her teats to the crying babes, and licked them clean of the mud.

After a shepherd happened upon the scene in the course of tending his flock, he ran to tell his companions, and a group gathered to witness the remarkable sight. The twins were clinging to her as she was their true mother. The she-wolf was nonplussed when the men began making a ruckus to scare her off. She withdrew into a cave that was sacred to the Greek colonists who had formerly lived in the area and held an altar to the nature god Pan.

Livy claims that the servants of Amulius dropped the twins in the standing water out of simple laziness. The fig tree just happened to be the first spot they came to and they figured the twins would drown no matter what. The twins cried in their basket until the waters receded and left them back on land. The she-wolf arrived from the hills looking for a drink of water when she heard their cries.

The servant was too afraid of the torrential waters to fully carry out the king's orders, according to Plutarch. After being left on the bank, the waters rose further and swept the twins away. It gently carried them along and then dropped them at the fig tree.

The three relay accounts wherein the term "lupa" refers not to a she-wolf, but is a slang word for prostitute. Plutarch tells two other stories not involving the she-wolf or abandonment. In one, the twins are fathered by Hercules after he wins a dice game. Their mother is the unwitting "prize". In another, the twins are switched at birth by their grandfather for a different pair of infants and secreted out of the city to be raised by shepherds and later, educated in nearby Gabii.

== Iconography ==
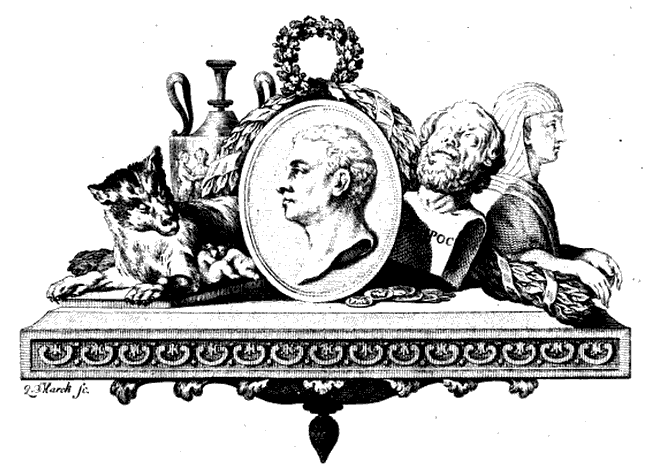
Figurehead from the title page of Geschichte der Kunst des Alterhums Vol. 1 (1776) by Johann Joachim Winckelmann. Winckelmann was a pioneer in the study of Graeco-Roman art and ancient Roman art in particular. He is center, with the she-wolf suckling the twins and Homer closest to him. The Sphinx and an Etruscan vase are in the background.

=== Earliest representation ===
The Etruscan "Bolsena Mirror" features a depiction of the she-wolf and the twins surrounded by human and animal figures. Differences in interpretation have precluded virtually any consensus regarding many of its features. This includes its age. However, it is consistent with other such mirrors, made as bridal gifts, in 4th century BC Euritria, perhaps circa 330–340. The famous Capitoline Wolf may be of Etruscan or Old Latin origin. But, a discovery during its restoration in 2000 and radiocarbon dating has cast doubt on an ancient origin. An Etruscan stele from Bologna, dated to between 350 and 400 BC, depicts an animal, possibly a wolf, nursing a single infant. By 269 BC, the silver didrachm is the earliest depiction of the complete icon, with the characteristic "turning of the she-wolf's head" backward and downward at the twins.

The distinctive imagery of the she-wolf and the twins made it more recognizable than other symbols of the city, such as Roma, the patron deity of the city, or the Roman eagle. That was useful as the Roman world expanded and symbols of Rome became more important in maintaining unity. By the 1st century AD, the she-wolf was common in both Rome and the provinces. She and the twins were featured on the elaborate Ara Pacis, built in honor of Augustus and dedicated to Pax, the goddess of peace.

Coins with their depiction were minted and widely circulated. They were also produced in Roman Colonies as a way to express their own "Roman-ness". They have been found on personal items such as swords, buckles, lamps and statuettes as well as monuments, mosaic floors and funerary stones that date from the 1st through the 3rd centuries AD.

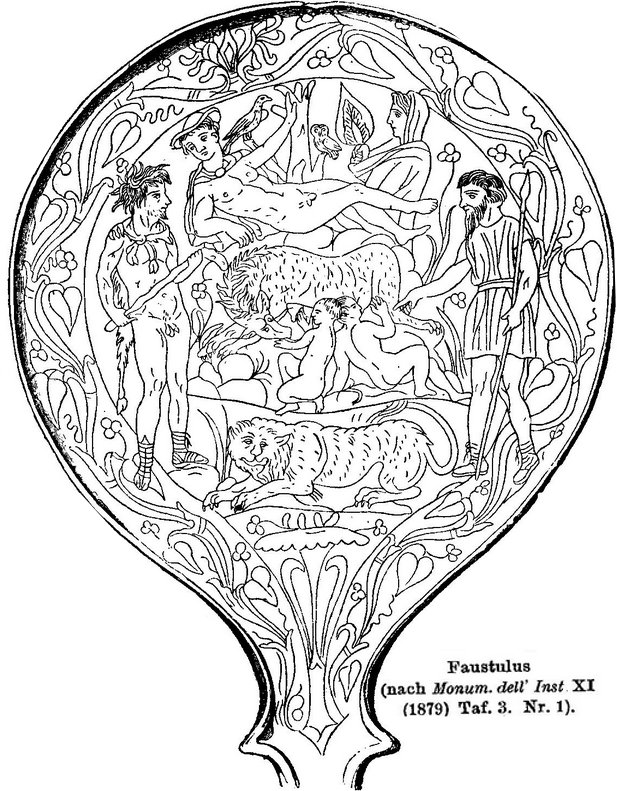
The controversial Mirror of Bolsena.

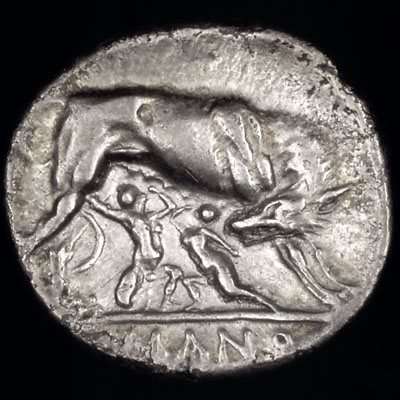
Romulus and Remus. An early silver didrachm (6.44 g). c. 269–266 BC

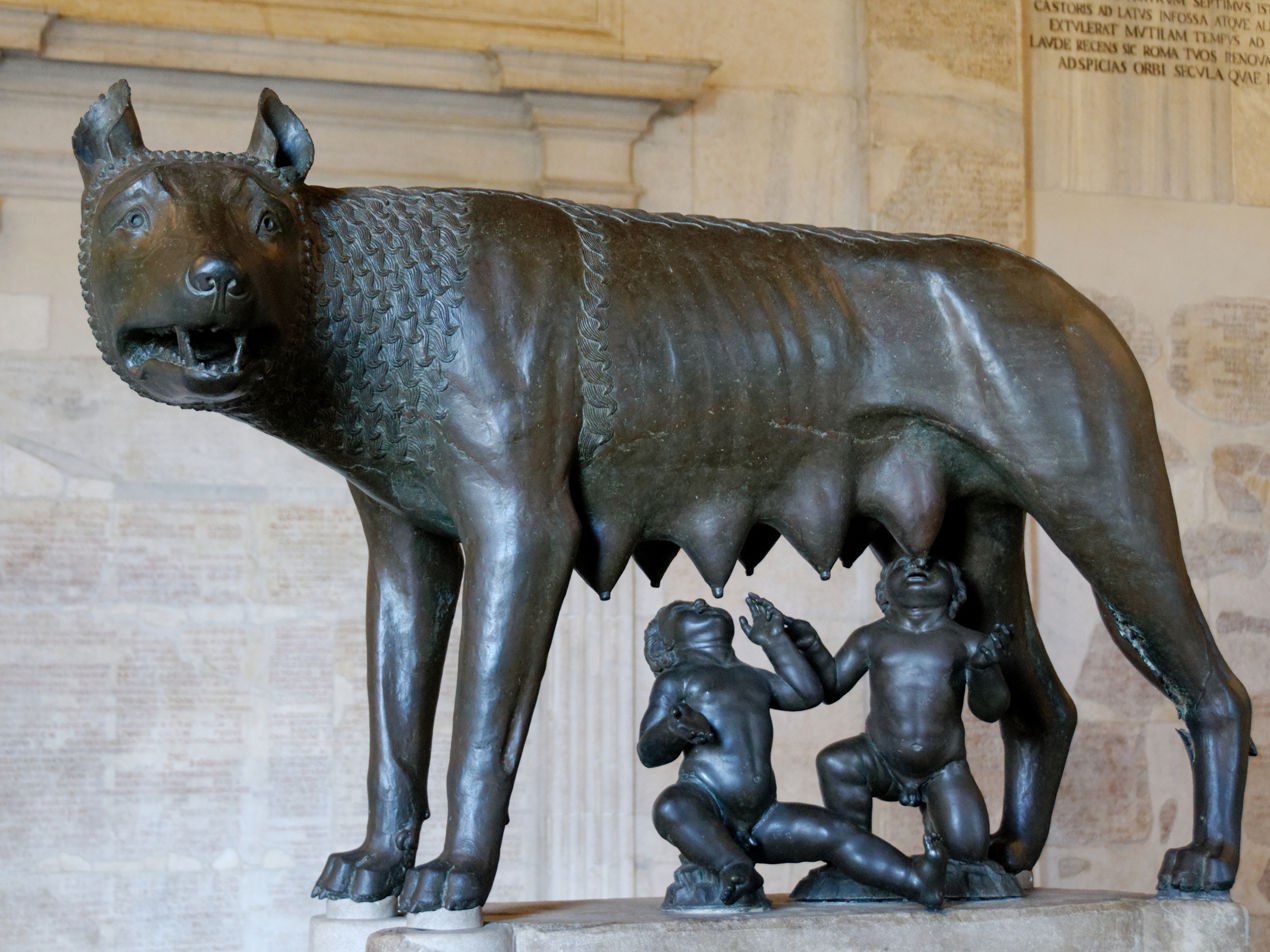
Capitoline Wolf. Its ancient origin is now in doubt.

=== Early middle ages ===
The Franks Casket, an ornately carved Anglo-Saxon chest from the 8th–9th century, probably crafted in Northumbria, features the she-wolf and twins, along with a Runic account of the Romulus and Remus story. Other Anglo-Saxon artifacts and coins from the same period also feature them. The Byzantines continued to use the image, and coins attributed to them have been found in various locations in central Asia at sites located in modern Tajikistan and Uzbekistan along with an 8th-century Sogdian painted mural with a she-wolf, head turned back and down, suckling two infants.

=== Sports ===
The Italian football clubs A.S. Roma and S.S. Robur Siena use the imagery in their respective team logos.

=== Mussolini ===
The Fascist government of Benito Mussolini used the she-wolf as a symbol in various ways.

He made an organisation named 'Sons of the She-Wolf' (Italian: Figli della Lupa). This aimed to indoctrinate young children (aged six to eight). This was a section of the wider youth organisation: Opera Nazionale Balilla. This is an equivalent to the Hitler's Youth in Nazi Germany at the time.

Mussolini also gifted bronze copies of the famous statue of the she-wolf, named the Capitoline Wolf, and currently housed in the Capitoline Museum, to various foreign cities utilising the she-wolf as an image of Roman power and of a thriving 'New Rome'. The cities that were sent the statue are: Cincinnati, Ohio, USA; Rome, Georgia, USA; Chiyoda, Tokyo, Japan; Timisoara, Romania.

Mussolini also featured the she-wolf in much of his propaganda and building projects, such as The 1937 Mostra Augustea della Romanità, which featured the she-wolf as a central icon of the exhibition. This linked with the aim of the expedition: to celebrate the bimillenium of the Emperor Augustus. The Fascist regime also placed statues and images of the she-wolf on buildings and in prominent spaces, such as where it is still visible today in the area around the Mausoleum of Augustus, and the Foro Mussolini (now Foro Italico) sports complex.

Mussolini also changed the coinage and stamps to depict the she-wolf, using it as a symbol of imperial authority.

=== Coats of arms and emblems ===
The coat of arms of the Basque Family Ariño of Navarre

The coat of arms of the Basque Family Artolaguirre of Donostia

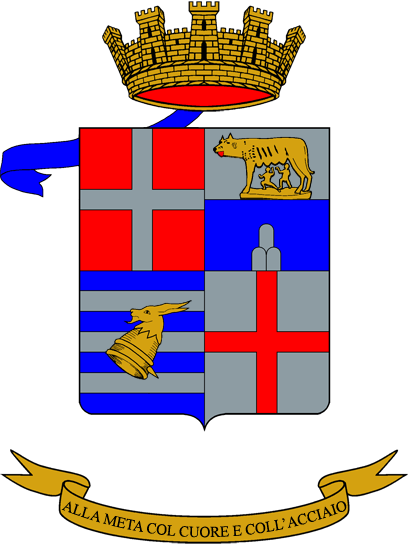
The coat of arms of the 9th Self-propelled Field Artillery Group ("Brennero") of the Italian Army

The coat of arms of the Commune of Caudebec-lès-Elbeuf, Normandy, France

The coat of arms of Cluj County, Romania

The emblem of surgeon and obstetrician to Napoleon, Baron Antoine Dubois, (1756–1837)

The coat of arms of the Commune of Estillac, Nouvelle-Aquitaine, France

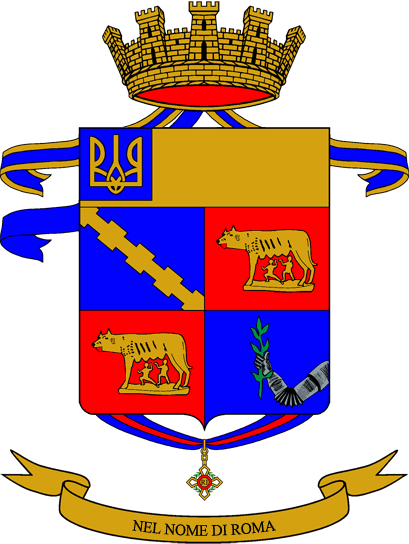
The coat of arms of the 80° Infantry Regiment of the Italian Army.

The coat of arms of La Louviere, Wallonia, Belgium

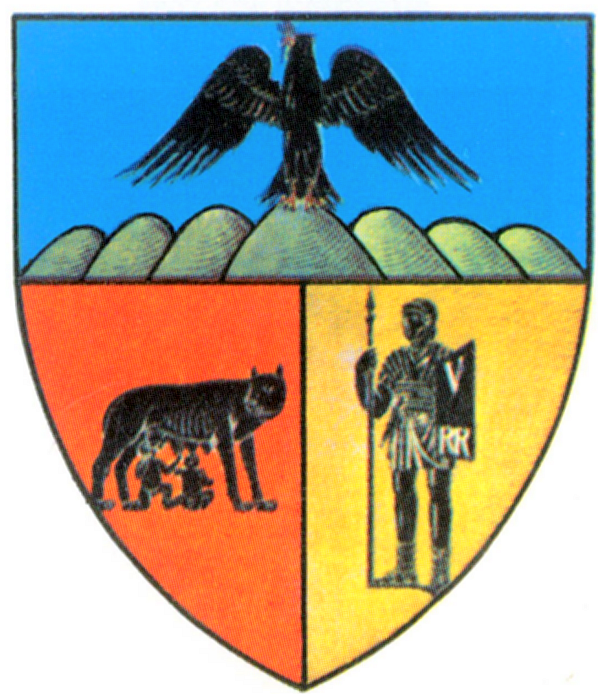
The coat of arms of Năsăud County, Romania

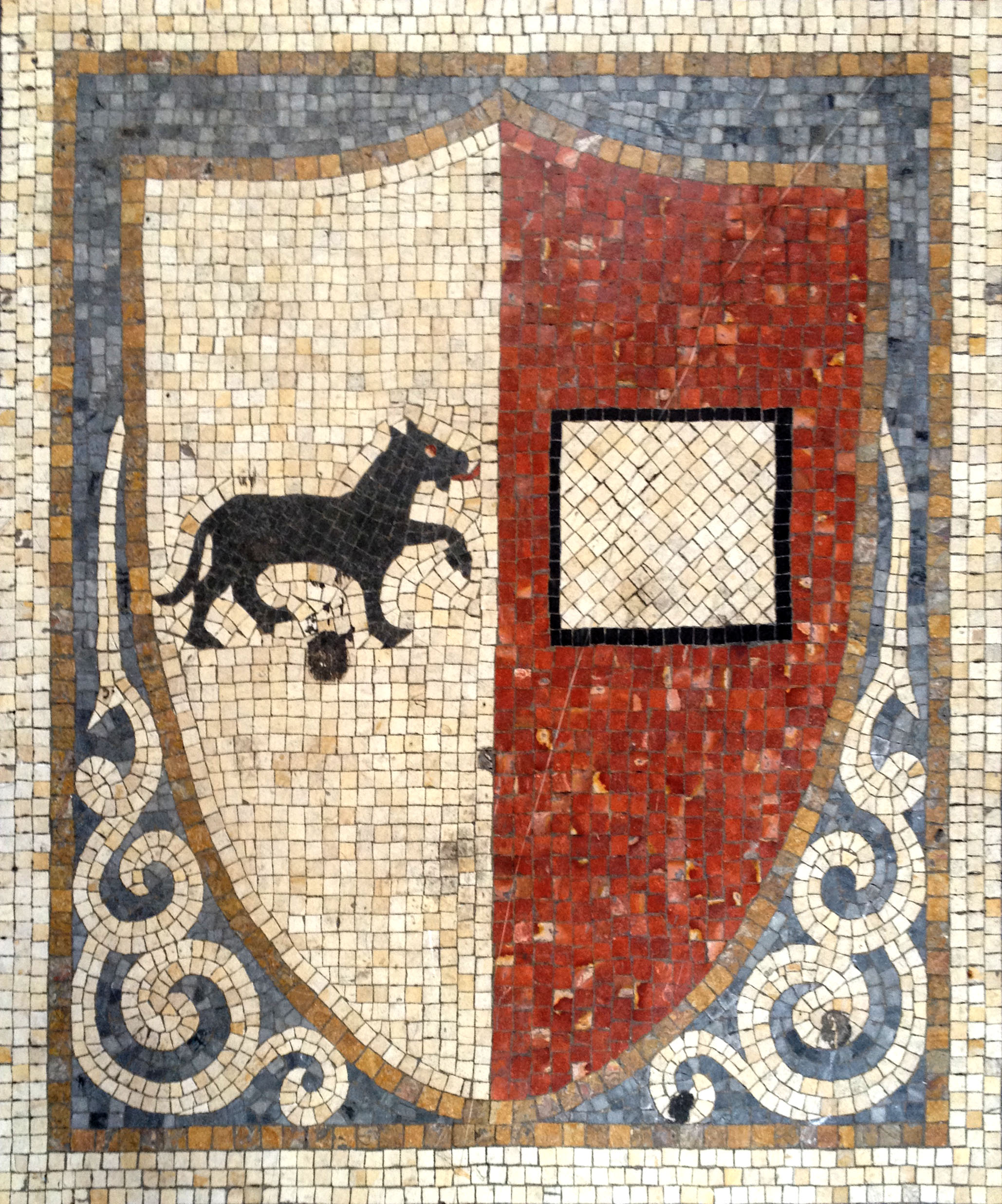
The ancient coat of arms of the city of Piacenza, Emilia-Romagna, Italy

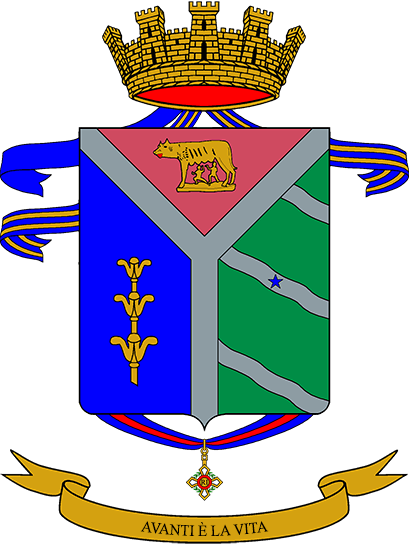
The coat of arms of the 8° Engineer Regiment of the Italian Army

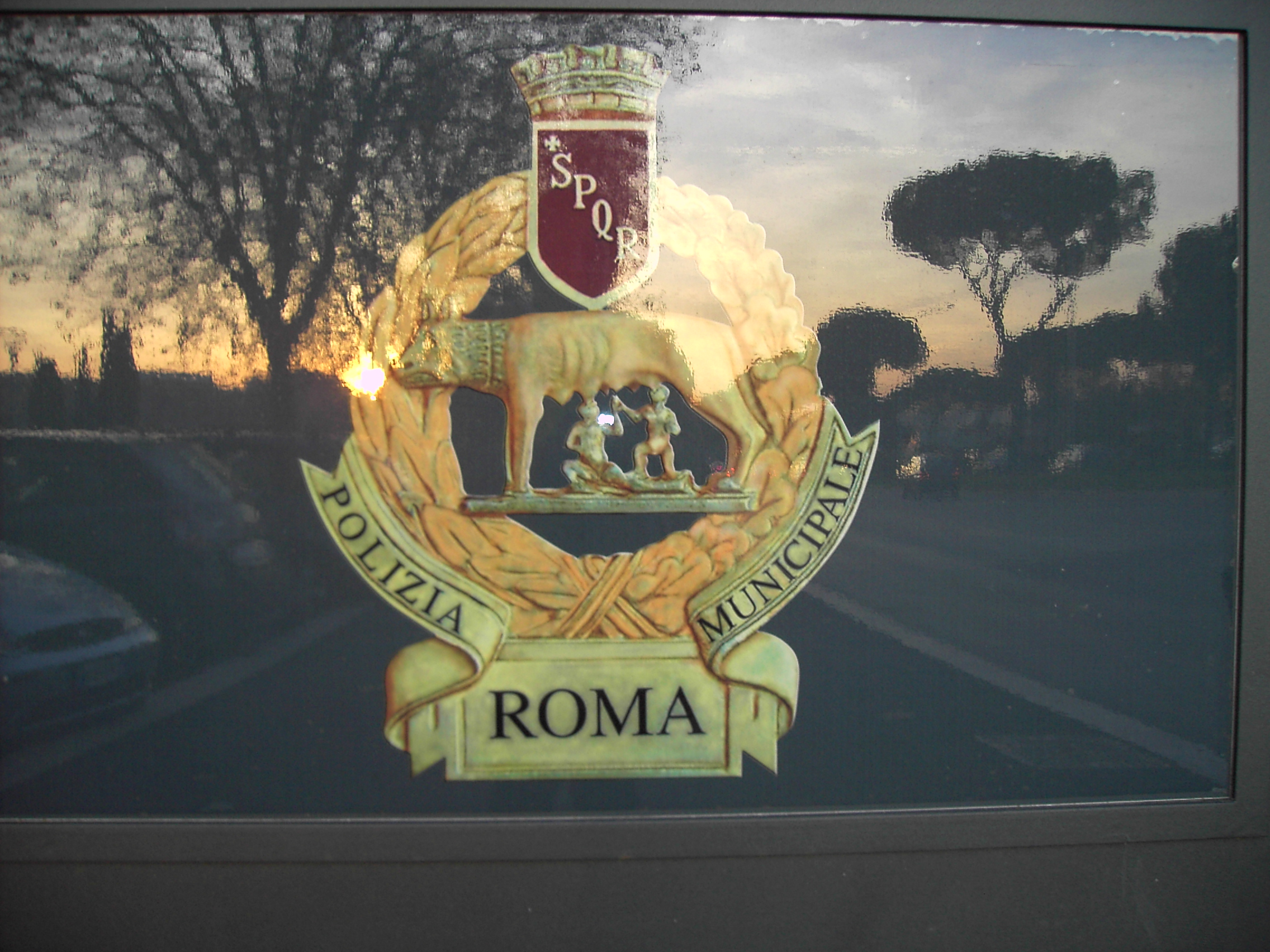
Emblem of the Capital Police of the Municipality of Rome

Reconstruction of the coat of arms of Rome under Napoleon

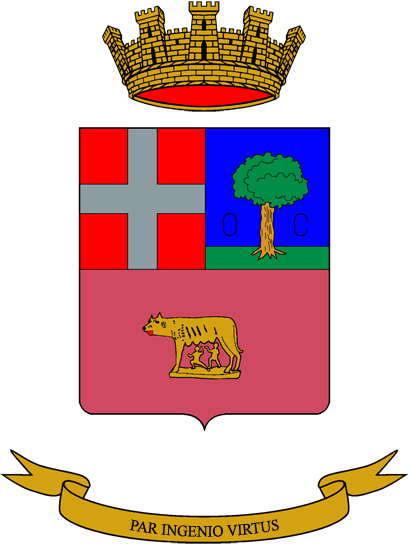
The coat of arms of the Combat Engineer School of the Italian Army.

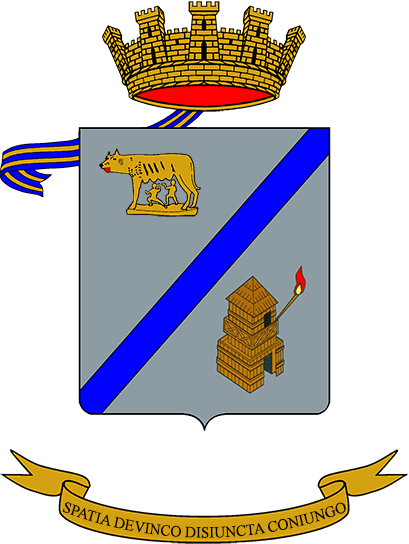
The emblem of the Italian Army Signal School

The coat of arms of the Commune of Villeloin-Coulangé, Centre-Val de Loire, France

=== Siena she-wolf ===
The Sienese have a traditional tale that the city was founded by Senius and Aschius, another pair of twins who were also suckled by a she-wolf. They were the sons of Remus and fled Rome after his death at the hands of their uncle Romulus. The legend cannot be attested to prior to the Renaissance. However, depictions of a she-wolf and twins are common in the city and some can be dated earlier.

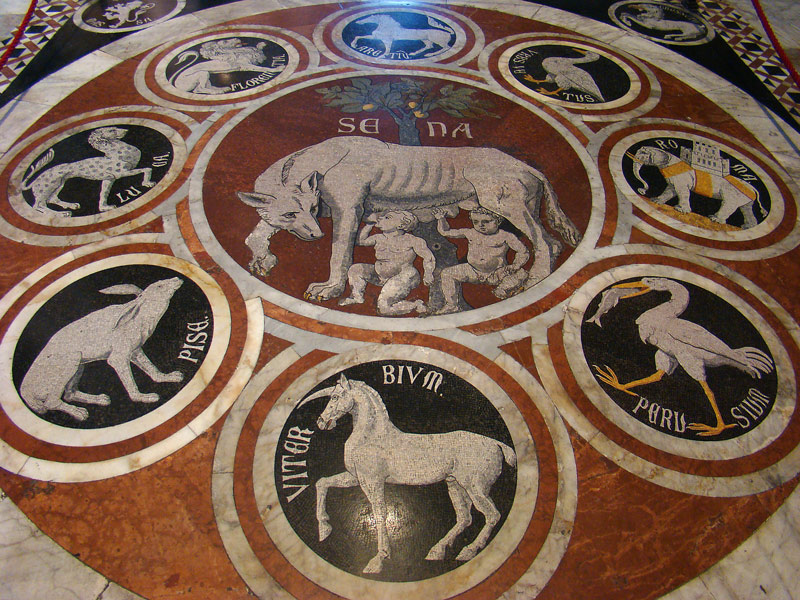
Ruota della Fortuna "The Wheel of Fortune" is the Centerpiece of the mosaic inlaid floor of the Siena Cathedral (c.1372)

=== Notes and coins ===
The she-wolf and twins appeared on what may have been the earliest silver coin ever minted in Rome.

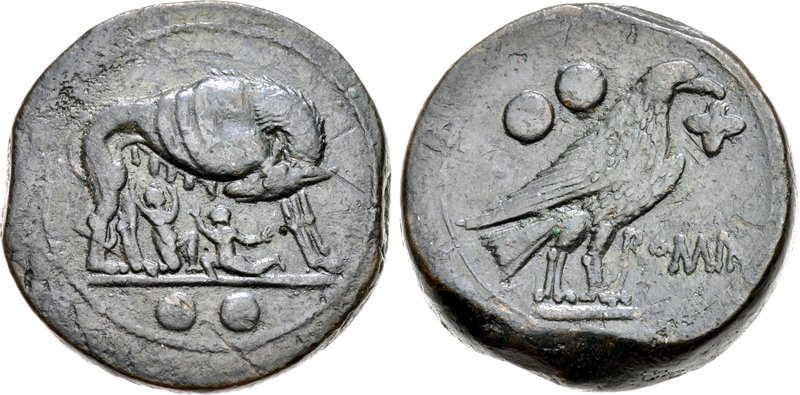
Sextans from c.215 BC

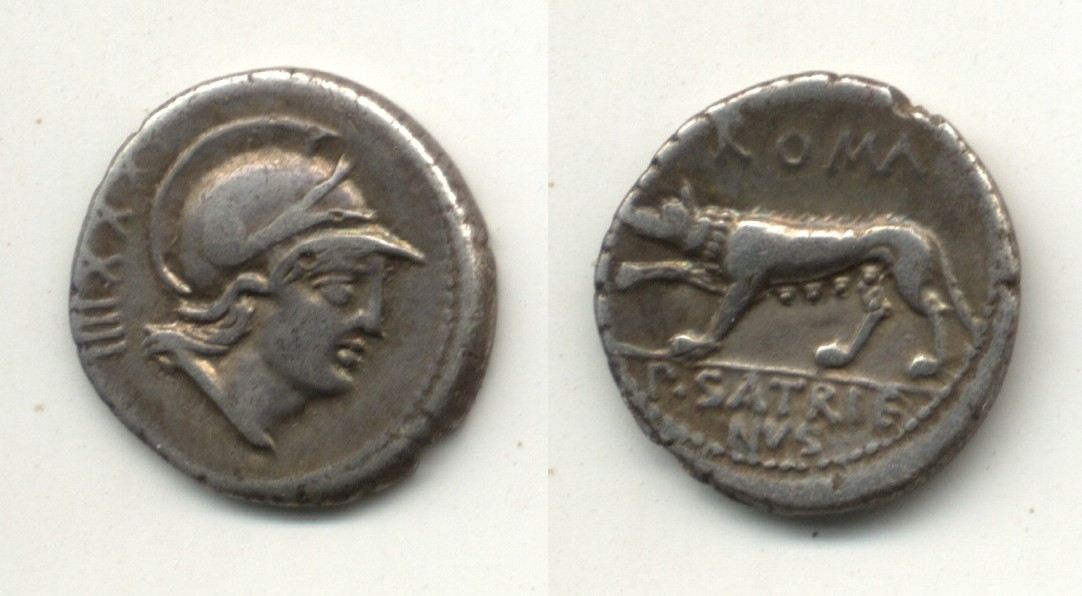
The she-wolf on a coin from c.77 BC With the head of Mars on the other side.

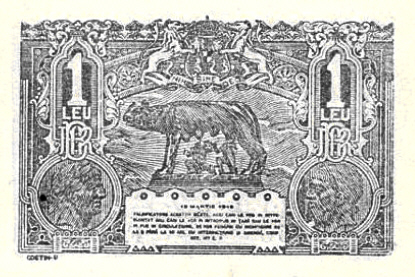
1 Romanian leu banknote, 1915.

== Lupercalia ==
The Lupercalia was a very ancient festival even during Roman times. Roman historians speculated as to its origins. It may be associated with the god Lupercus, the god of shepherds and protector of flocks. Some historians link it to the she-wolf and the Lupercal.

== Depictions in art ==
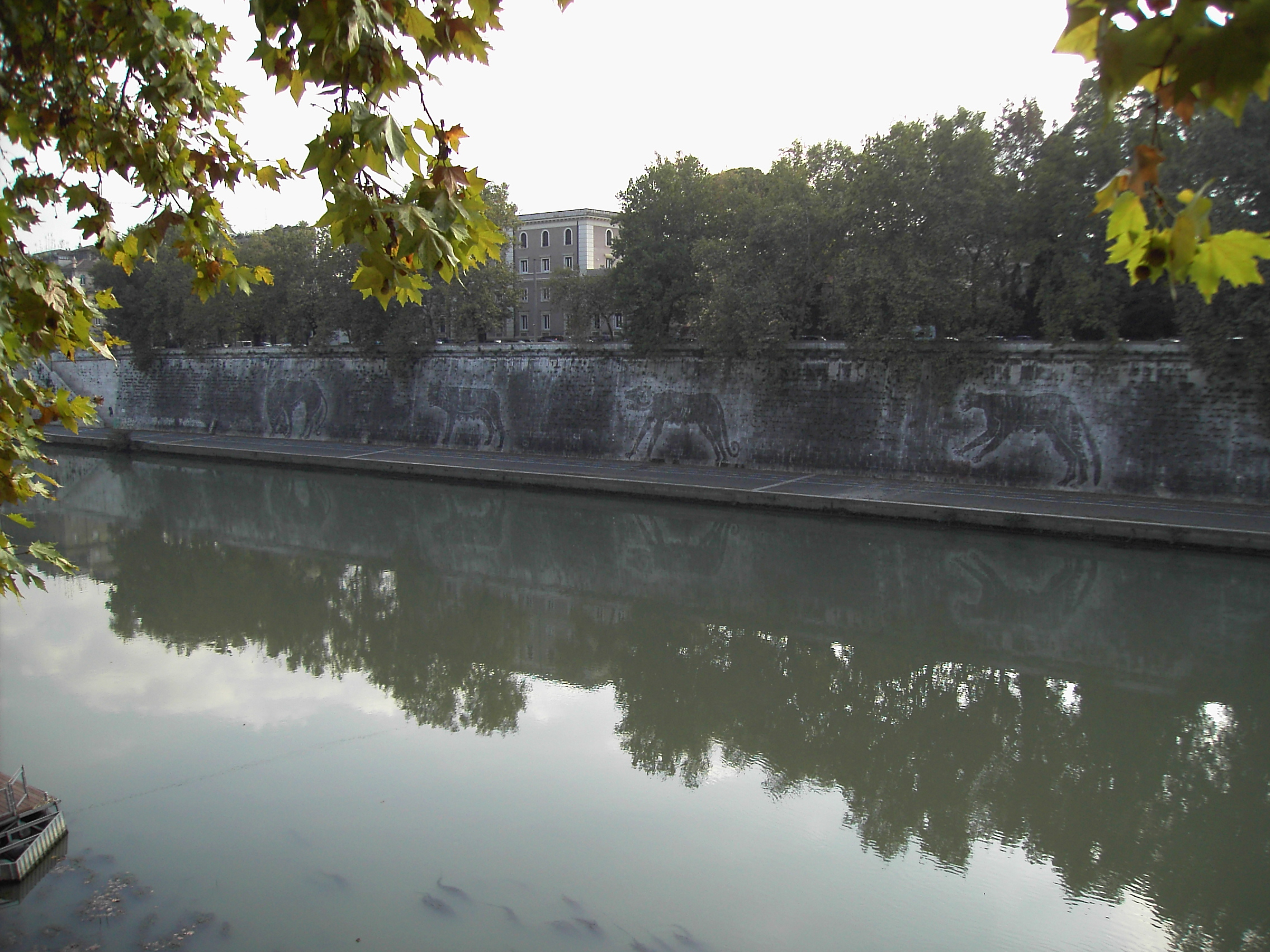
The she-wolf on the embankments of the Tiber

=== Late antiquity ===
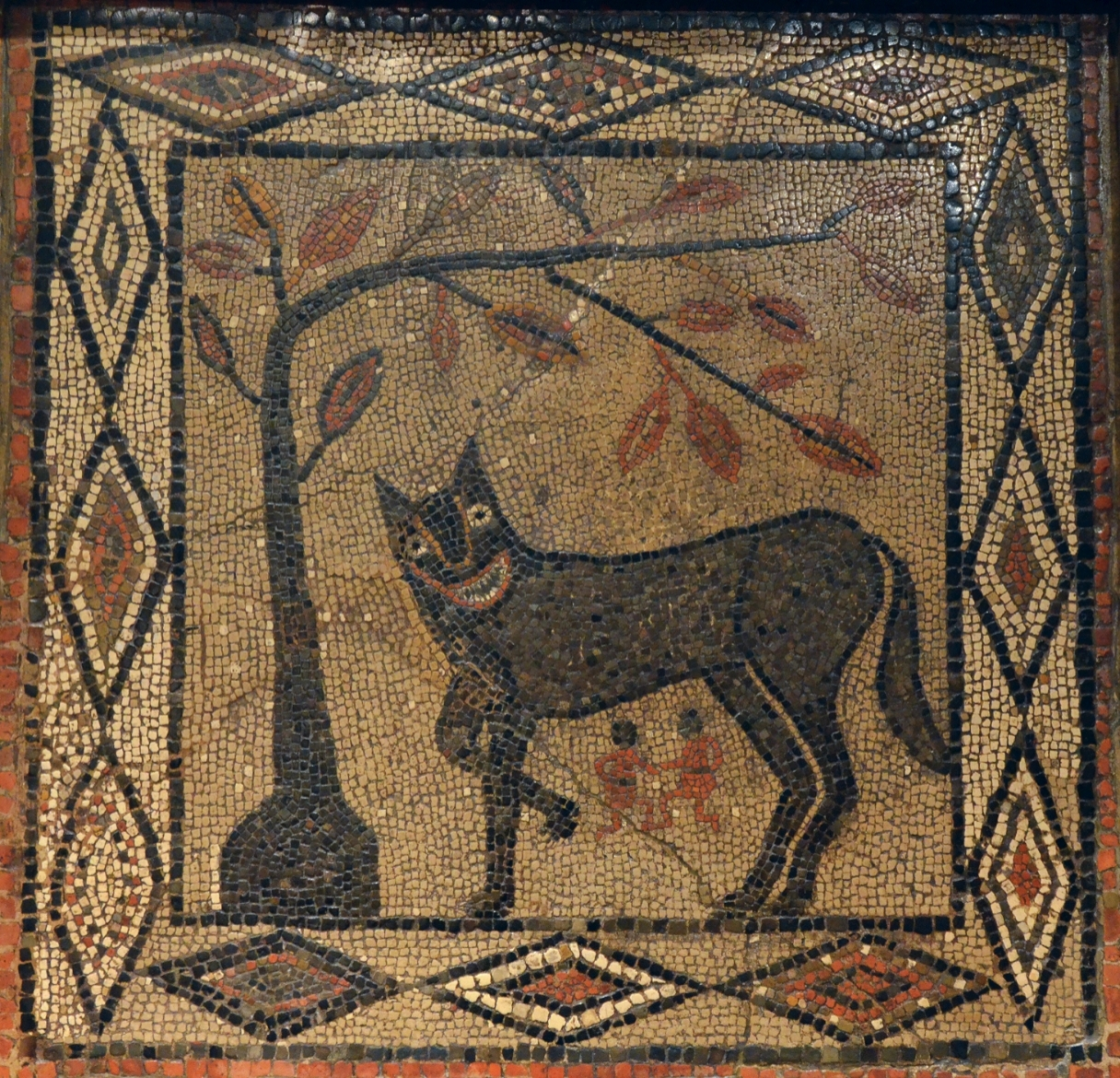
Mosaic depicting the she-wolf with Romulus and Remus, from Aldborough (c.300 AD), Leeds City Museum (16025914306)

=== Middle ages ===
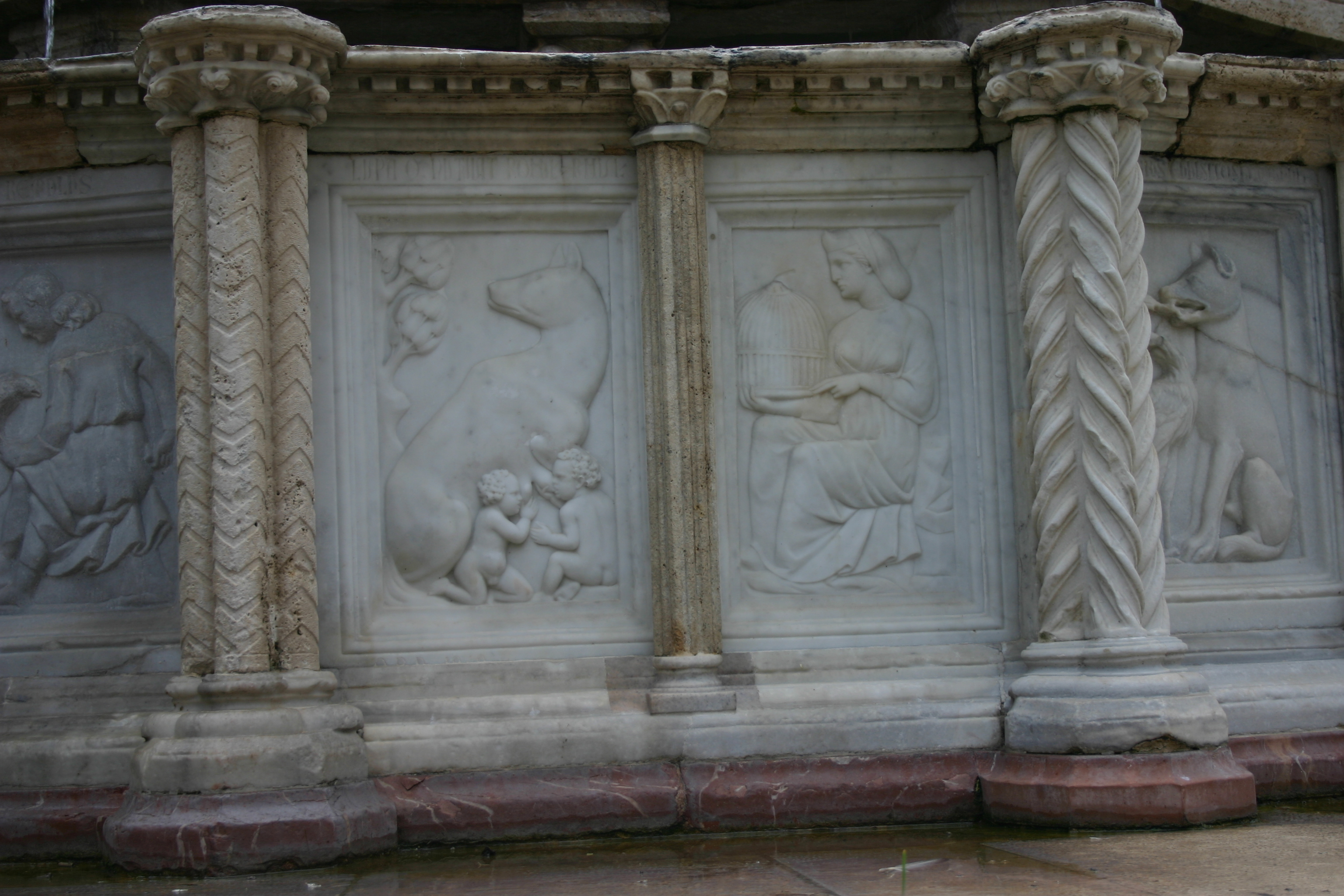
Replica of Fontana Maggiore of Perugia, Nocolai and Giovanni Pisano (1275), photo by G. Dall'Orto (August 5, 2006)

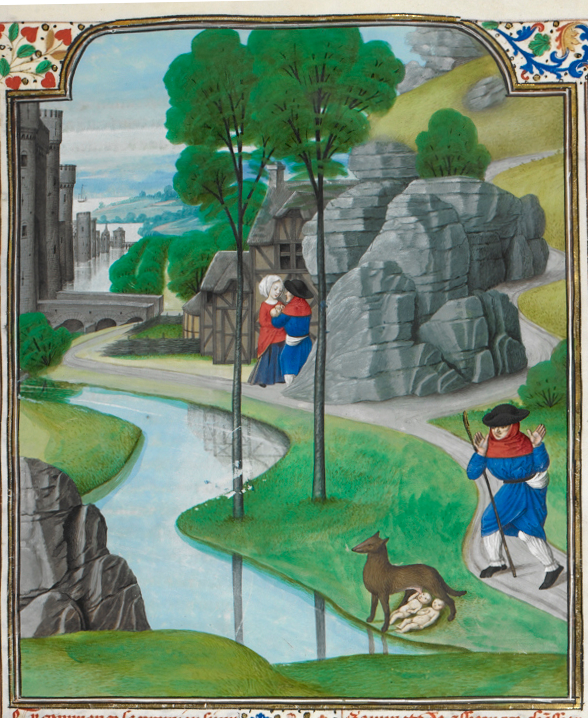
From Romuleon, an illuminated manuscript (British Library (1480)

=== Renaissance ===
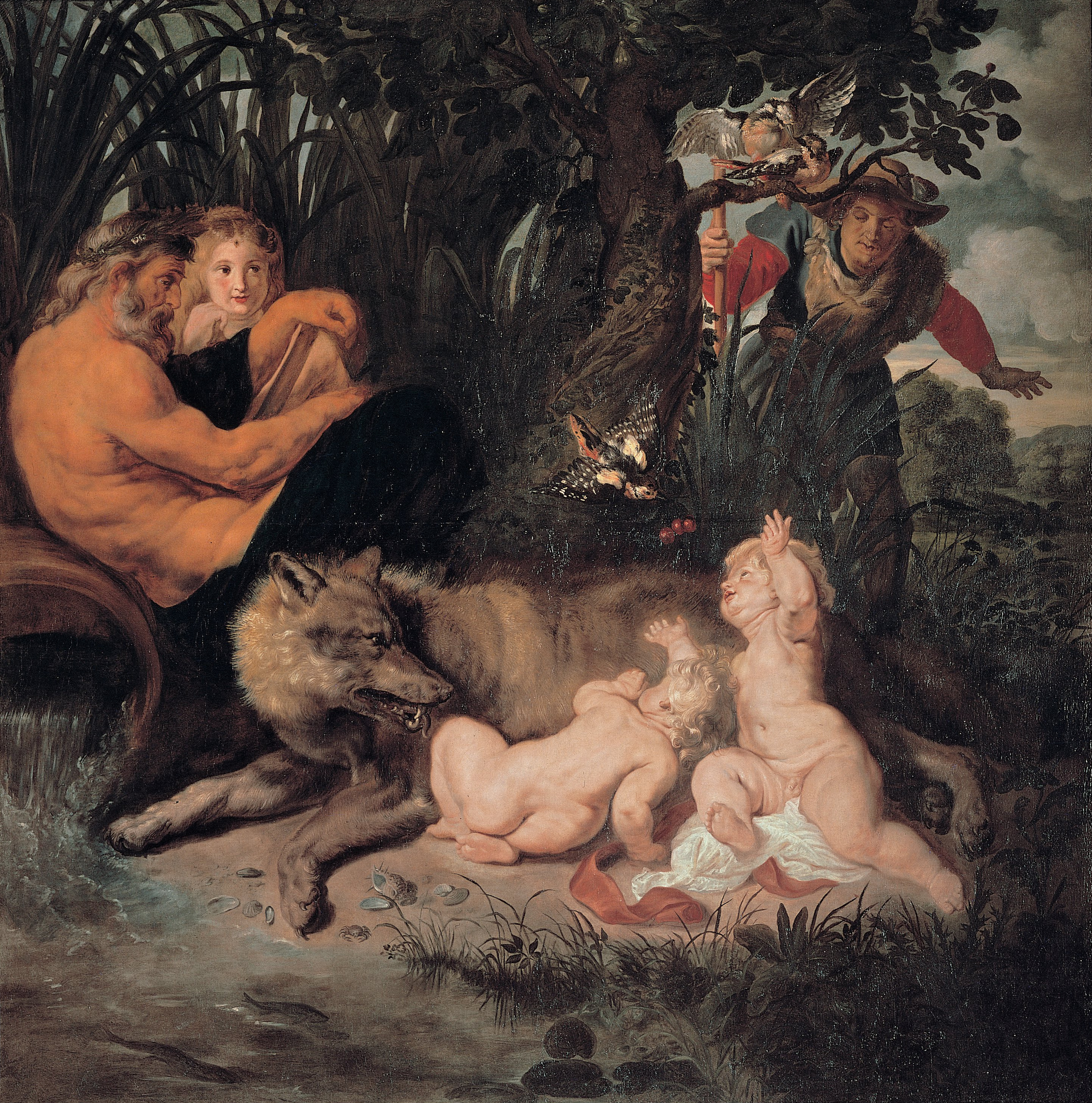
Romulus and Remus, Peter Paul Rubens (1616)

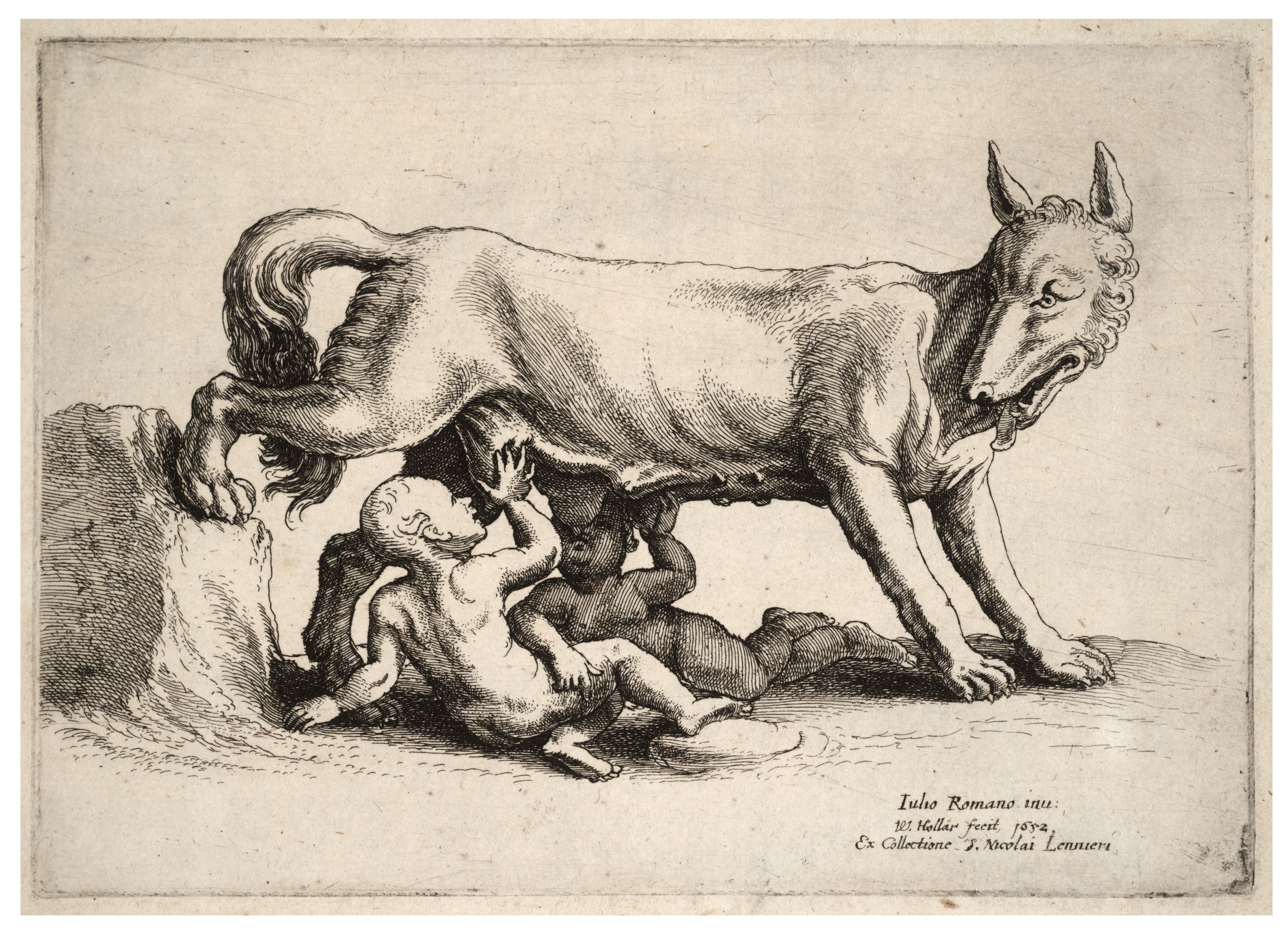
Romulus and Remus Wenceslas Hollar after Giulio Romano, (16c.)

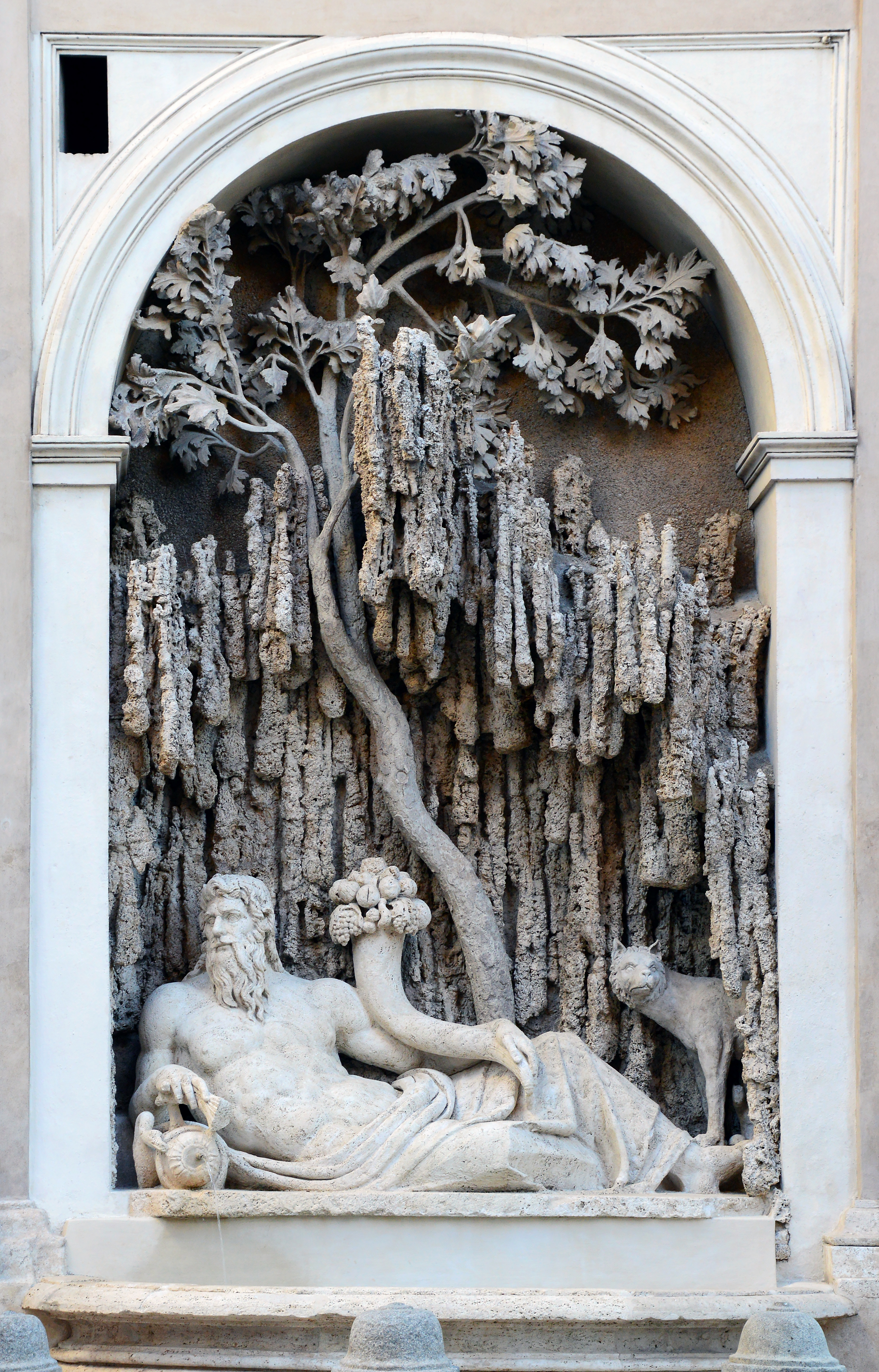
The River Tiber from the Quattro Fontane by Muzio Mattei and Domenico Fontana (late 16c.). The she-wolf can be seen peeking from behind Father Tiber on the right.

=== 18th-20th Centuries ===
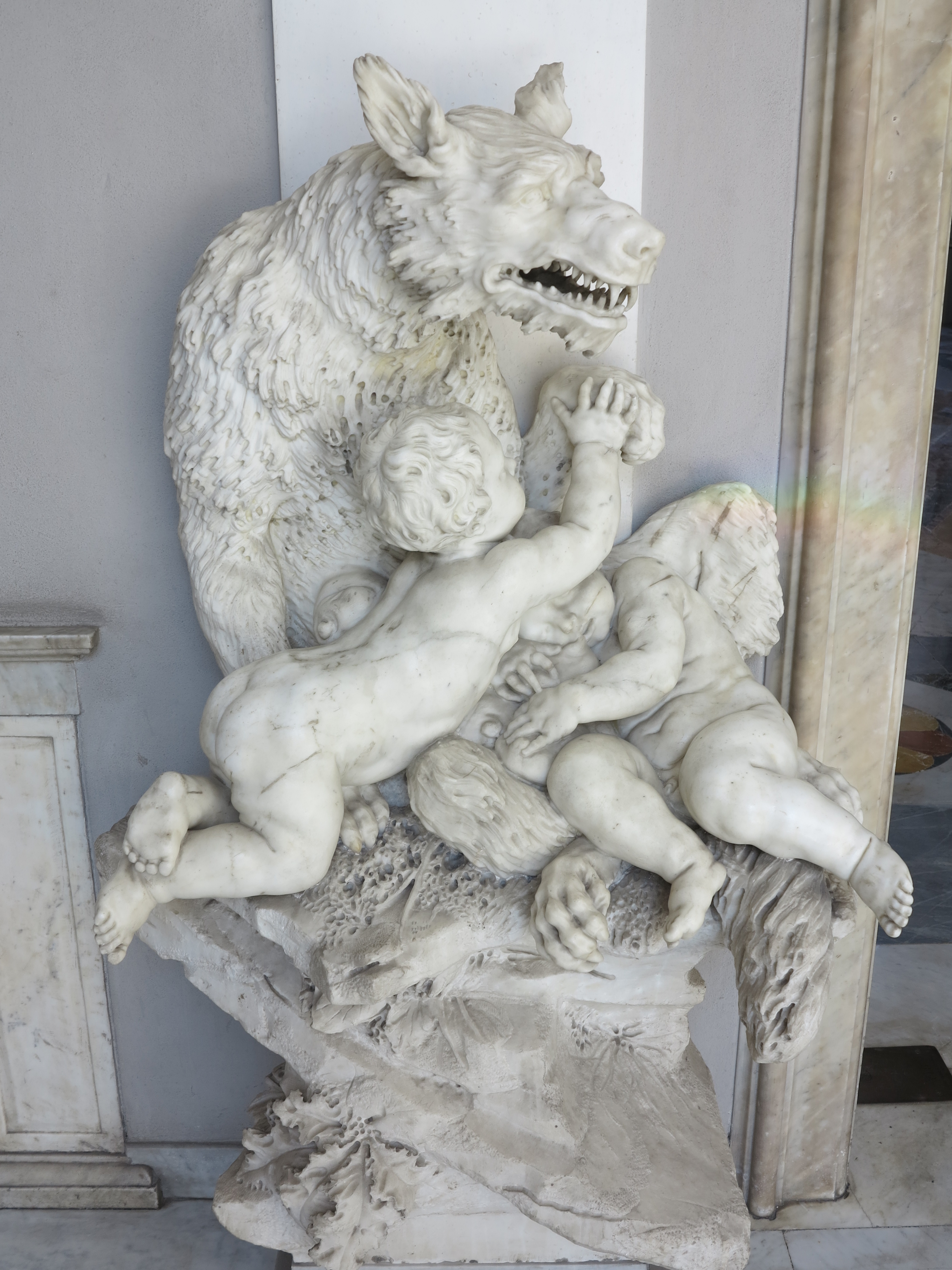
La lupa con Romolo e Remo "The she-wolf with Romulus and Remus", Domenico Parodi and Francesco Biggi (1874)

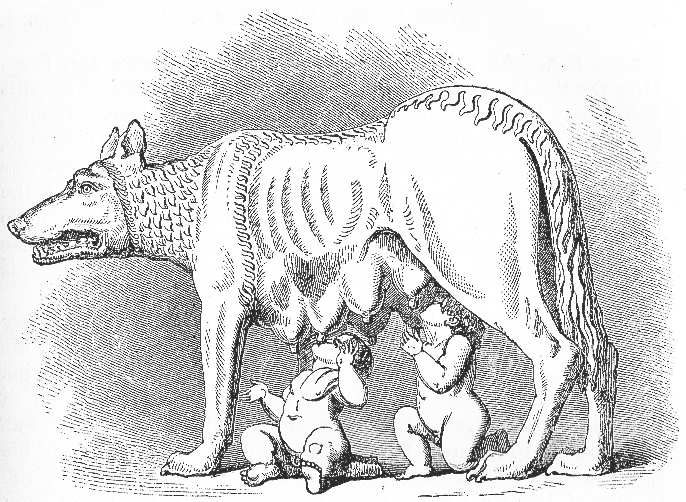
Scanned from "History of Rome", published 1860, by Henry Liddell (6 February 1811 – 18 January 1898) with illustrations provided by Sir John Gardner Wilkinson (5 October 1797 – 29 October 1875). Scanned by Man vyi

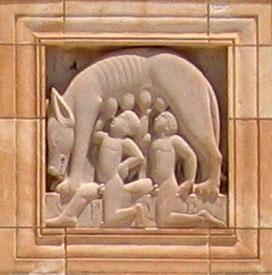
Romulus and Remus from Ten Tribes, sculptor: Eric Gill, photo by David Ozeransky (1932)

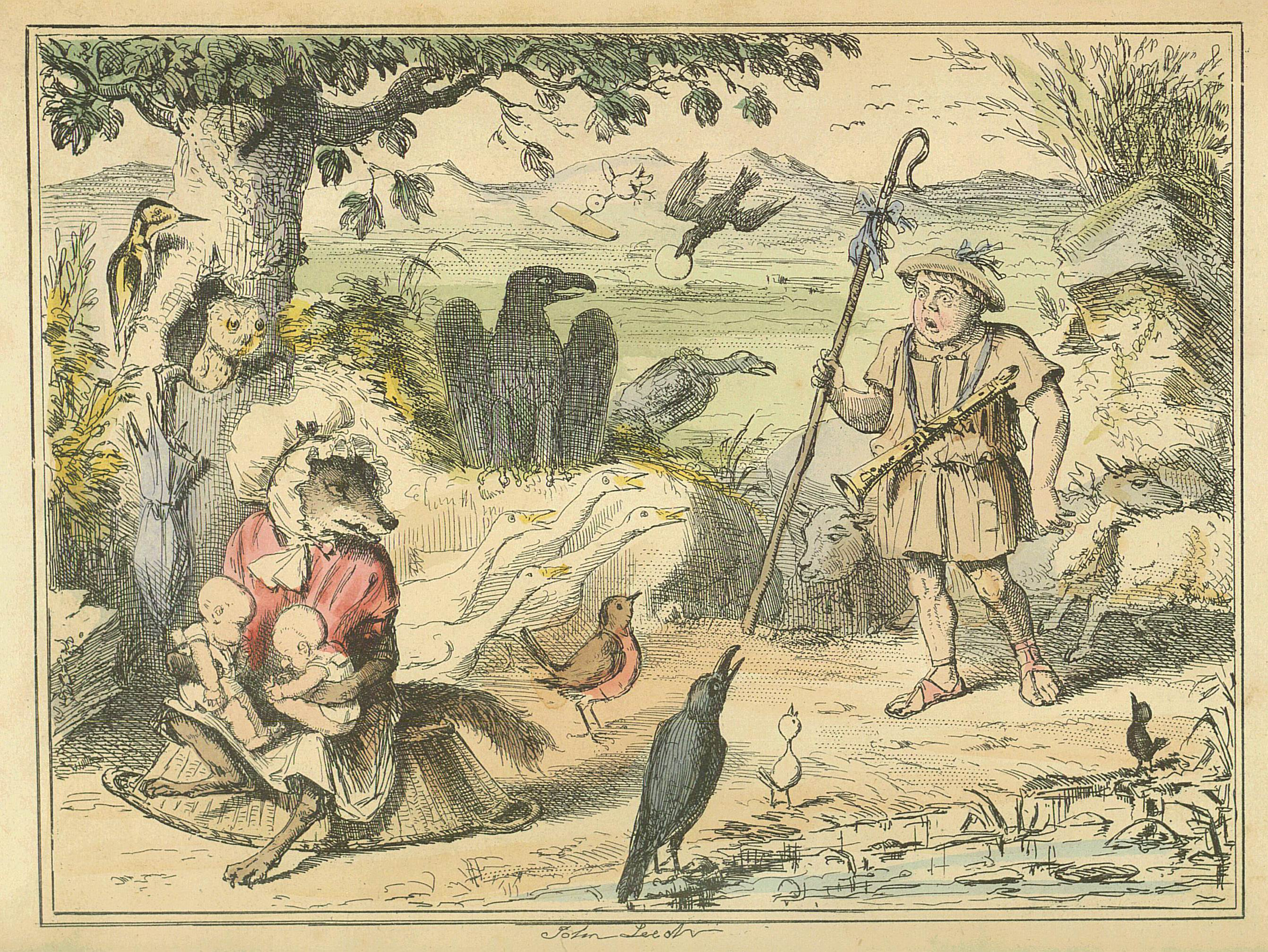
Comic History of Rome Table 01, featuring a matronly she-wolf and Picus, the woodpecker overhead. John Leech (c.1850)

== See also ==
- List of wolves
- Asena
