= Plutei of Trajan =

Ancient Roman carvings

Coordinates: 41.8926°N 12.4846°E

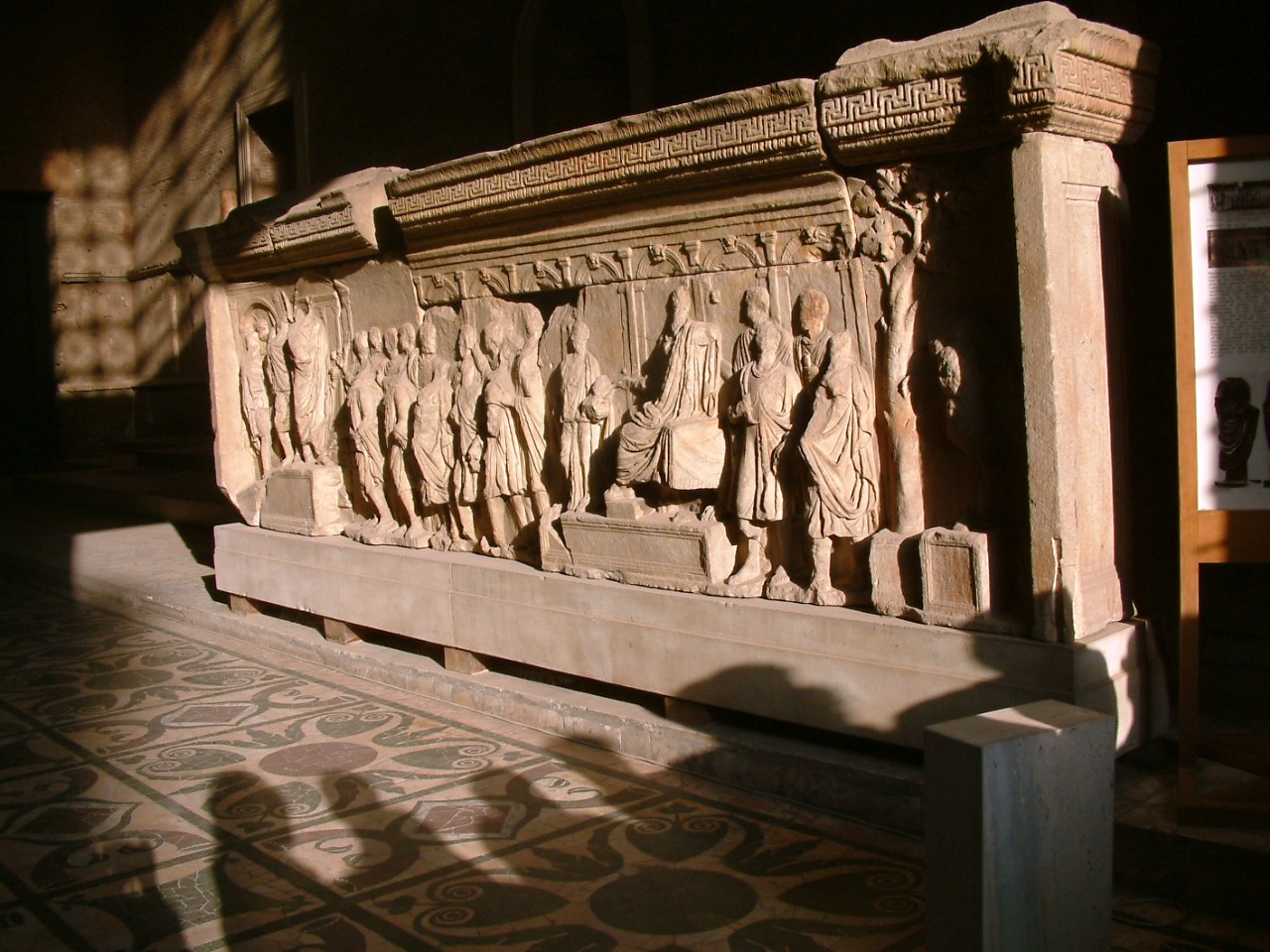
A relief from the Plutei Trajan

The Plutei of Trajan (Latin Plutei Traiani; often called the Anaglypha Traiani) are carved stone balustrades built for the Roman emperor Trajan. They are on display inside the Curia Julia in the Roman Forum today, but are not part of the original structure.

It is unknown exactly where Trajan erected them. They are believed to have been built either on the edge of the Rostra or on the sides of the Lapis Niger marking the underground "Tomb of Romulus". In spite of this uncertainty, they are of great historical value because the carvings show the full length of both sides of the Forum at the time they were erected.

== Description ==
=== Foreground carvings ===
The relief on the right side shows Trajan in the Forum Romanum, where he institutes a charitable organisation for orphans (known as the alimenta). Trajan is seated on a podium in the middle of the Forum, together with a personification of Italia carrying a child on her arm.

The left relief shows the destruction of tax records in the presence of the emperor, probably Hadrian in 118, to the tune of 900 million sesterces. The wooden tablets with the tax records are carried forth and burned in the presence of the emperor, who is standing in front of the Rostra. The practice of "fiscal pardon" had been carried out previously under Trajan following his victory in the First Dacian War in 102.

=== Background carvings ===
The backgrounds of both the right and left sides depict buildings on the Forum Romanum.

On the right relief, depicted left to right, the buildings are: The Ficus Ruminalis and the statue of Marsyas; the Basilica Julia; the Temple of Saturn; the Temple of Vespasian and Titus; and the Rostra (only one of which is visible). A part of the relief is missing, where the Temple of Concord should have been.

On the left, again from left to right: the speakers' platform in front of the Temple of Divus Julius; the Arch of Augustus; the Temple of Castor and Pollux; the Vicus Tuscus; the Basilica Julia; the Ficus Ruminalis and the statue of Marsyas.
