= Fausto Zevi =

Contemporary Italian classical archaeologist

Fausto Zevi is a contemporary Italian classical archaeologist.

Presently he is professor of Archaeology and Greco-Roman art history at the University of Rome La Sapienza and has previously held posts at the University of Naples Federico II and as archaeological superintendent at Ostia, Naples, and Rome. He is a prolific scholar with more than 200 publications on archaic Rome, Roman hellenism, the topography and urban plan of Pompeii, Ostia, and Rome. He is a member of the Accademia Nazionale dei Lincei, the German Archaeological Institute, and an honorary fellow of the British School at Rome.

Zevi was a student of Ranuccio Bianchi Bandinelli.
