= Capitoline Wolf (disambiguation) =

The Capitoline Wolf is a bronze sculpture in Rome depicting the city's founding.

Capitoline Wolf may also refer to the following similar statues:

- Capitoline Wolf, Chișinău, Moldova
- Capitoline Wolf Statue, Cluj-Napoca, Romania
- Capitoline Wolf, Bucharest, Romania
- Capitoline Wolf, Timișoara, Romania
- Capitoline Wolf Statue, Cincinnati, Ohio, United States

== See also ==
- List of Capitoline Wolf statues
