= Piața Romană =

Important square in Bucharest, Romania

Coordinates: 44°26′49.16″N 26°5′47.61″E

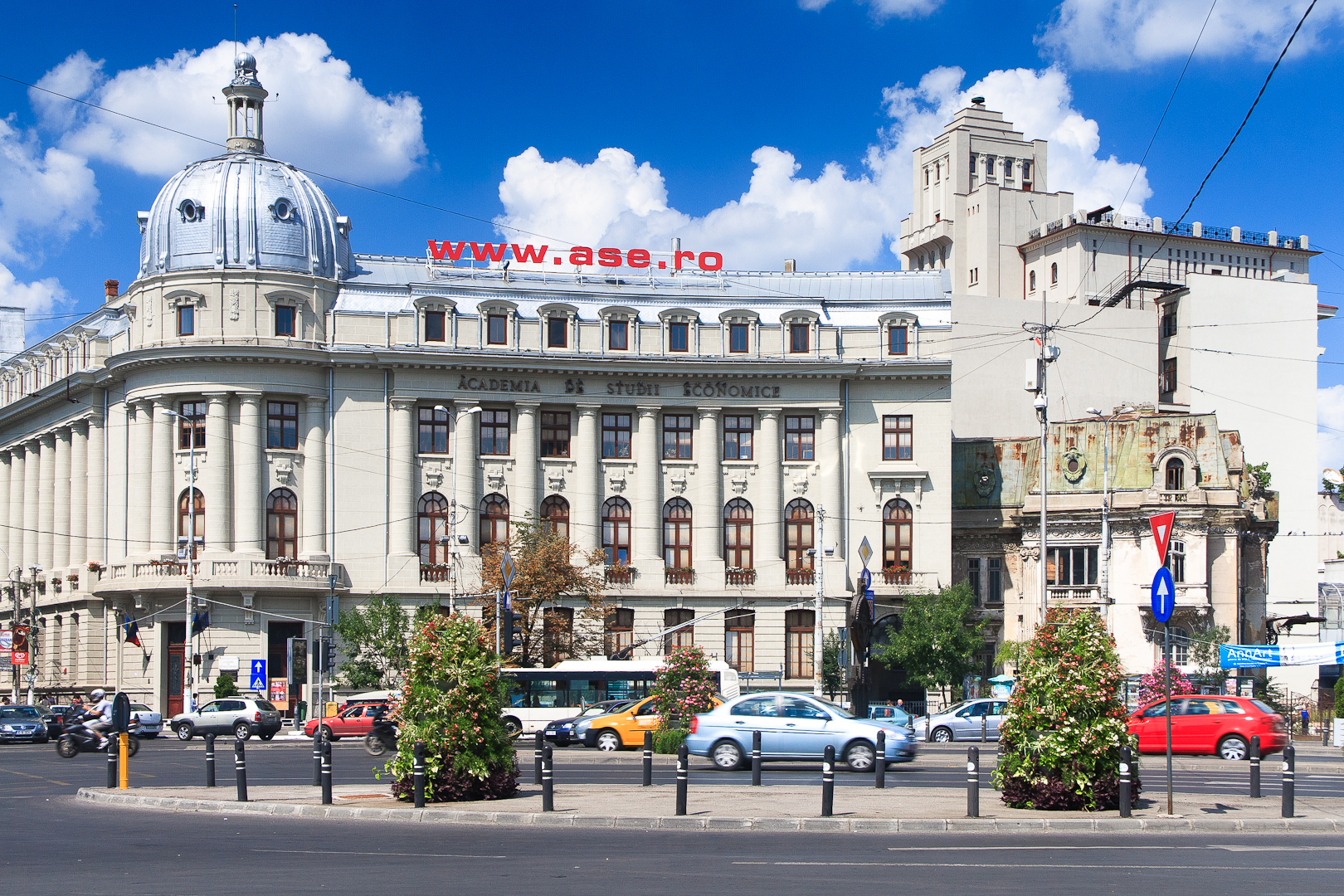
The ASE building, as seen from Piața Romană

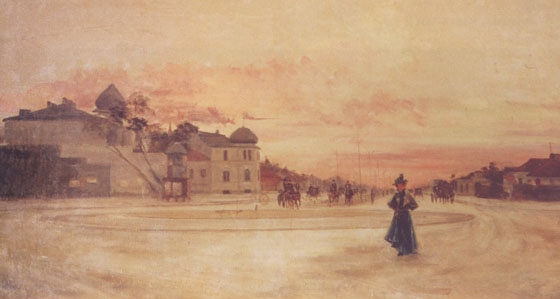
Piața Romană, a 19th-century painting by Juan Alpar

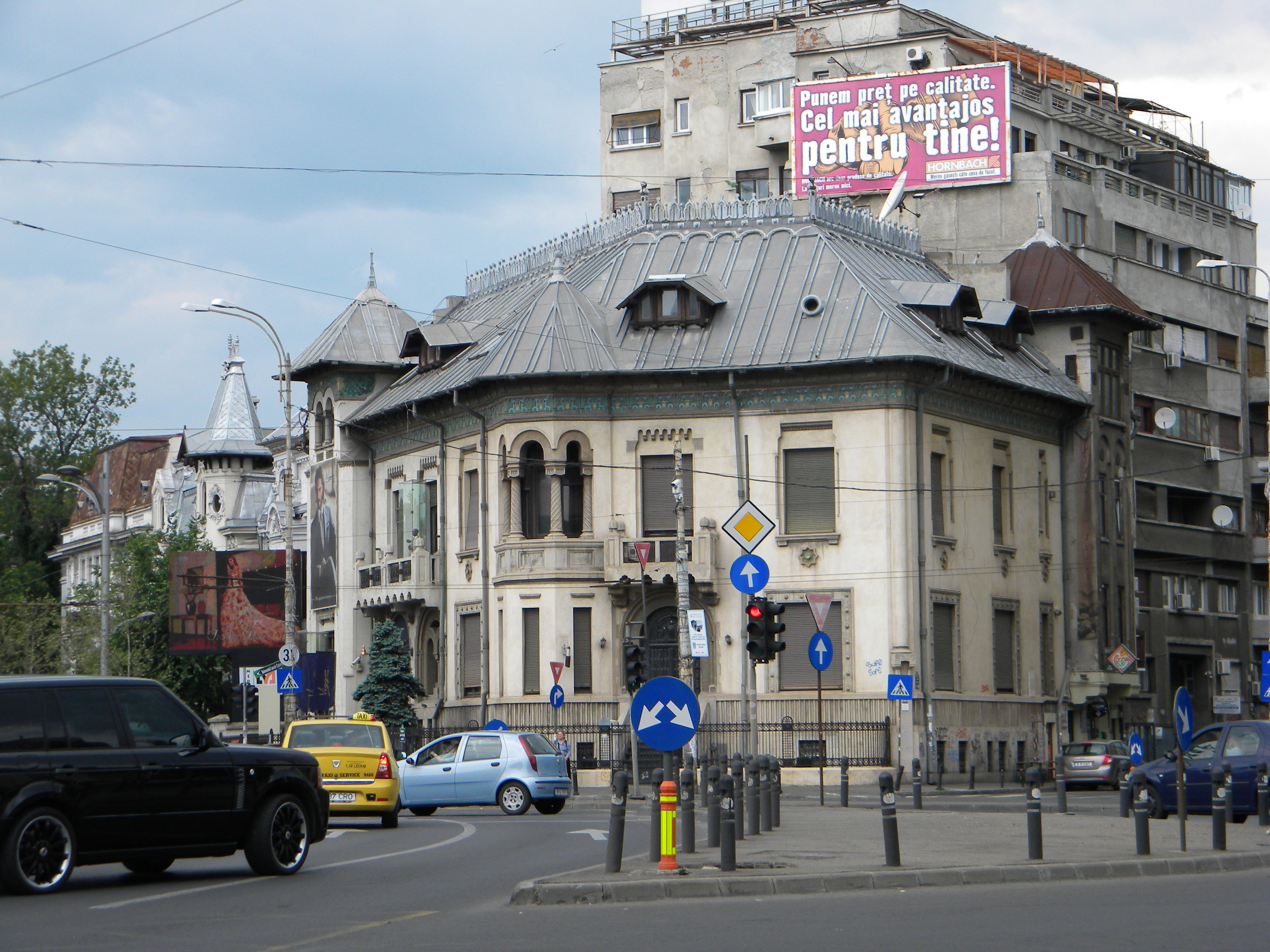
The Gheorghe Petrașcu House

Piața Romană (The Roman Square) is a major traffic intersection in Sector 1, central Bucharest.

Two major boulevards intersect in Piața Romană: Lascăr Catargiu Boulevard (which runs northwest towards Piața Victoriei) and Magheru Boulevard (which runs south by southeast towards University Square). The two roads also coincide geographically with the Bucharest Metro Line M2. The square is served by the Piața Romană metro station, on Magheru Boulevard. Dacia Boulevard runs roughly east–west through the square.

Between 1997 and 2010, Piața Romană featured the Capitoline Wolf statue, a symbol of Latinity (see also the Capitoline Wolf Statue in Cluj-Napoca). The statue was since relocated to I.C. Brătianu Boulevard.

The main building of the Academy of Economic Studies (founded in 1913) is located to the north of the square. The square is flanked by the two Petrașcu Houses: the one at No. 1 was built in the Neo-Romanian style in 1907, according to the designs of architect Ion Mincu, while the one at No. 5 was built in 1913, according to the plans of architect Spiridon Cegăneanu.
