= Capitoline Wolf, Bucharest =

Monument in Bucharest, Romania

Coordinates: 44.431733°N 26.103317°E

Capitoline Wolf
- Lupoaica Capitolină
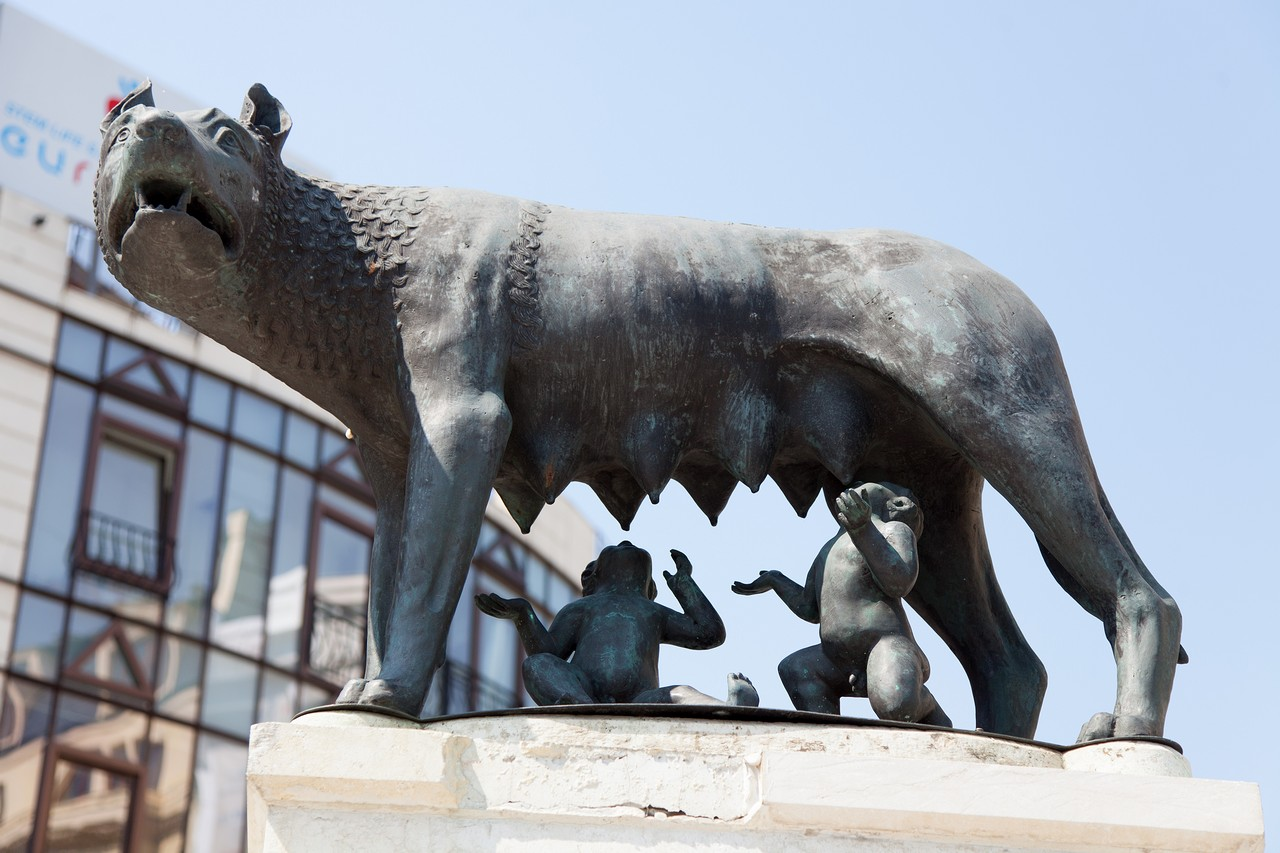
- Interactive map of Capitoline Wolf
- Location: Bucharest
- Material: bronze, stone
- Height: 3.30 metres (10.8 ft) (with the pedestal)
- Opening date: September 7, 1906
- Dedicated to: Roman conquest of Dacia

The Capitoline Wolf Statue (Romanian: Statuia Lupoaicei) is a statue located in I.C. Brătianu Boulevard in Bucharest, Romania. It is a historical monument, with the National Register of Historic Monuments in Romania code B-III-m-B-20029.

== History ==
In 1906, on the occasion of celebrating 40 years since King Carol I's coronation as the ruler of Romania and 1800 years since the Roman conquest of Dacia, the municipality of Rome gifted a copy of the famous Roman monument "Lupa Capitolina" to the people of Bucharest. This statue depicted the legendary she-wolf that, according to Roman mythology, nursed Romulus and Remus, the founders of Rome. The bronze copy was created by an anonymous Greek sculptor.

Initially, the statue was placed on a stone pedestal bearing the acronym SPQR (Senatus Populus Que Romanus, meaning the Senate and the People of Rome). It was first installed within the "Arenas Romane" area of "Carol I Park" on September 7, 1906. Later, in 1908, it was moved to St. George Square (formerly known as Rome Square). In 1931, it was relocated to Dealul Mitropoliei, then in 1965 to a small park in Dorobanți Square. In 1997, it was placed in Piața Romană, where it remained until 2009. During this time, it was stolen several times, either partially (Romulus or Remus) or entirely, but it was often recovered. It periodically disappeared for "maintenance."

In 2010, it was moved once again following discussions between the Mayor of Bucharest, Sorin Oprescu, and the Italian Ambassador. They decided to place the statue on Bd. I.C. Brătianu.

== See also ==
- Capitoline Wolf, Chișinău
- Capitoline Wolf Statue, Cluj-Napoca
- Capitoline Wolf statues in cities
