= List of Capitoline Wolf statues =

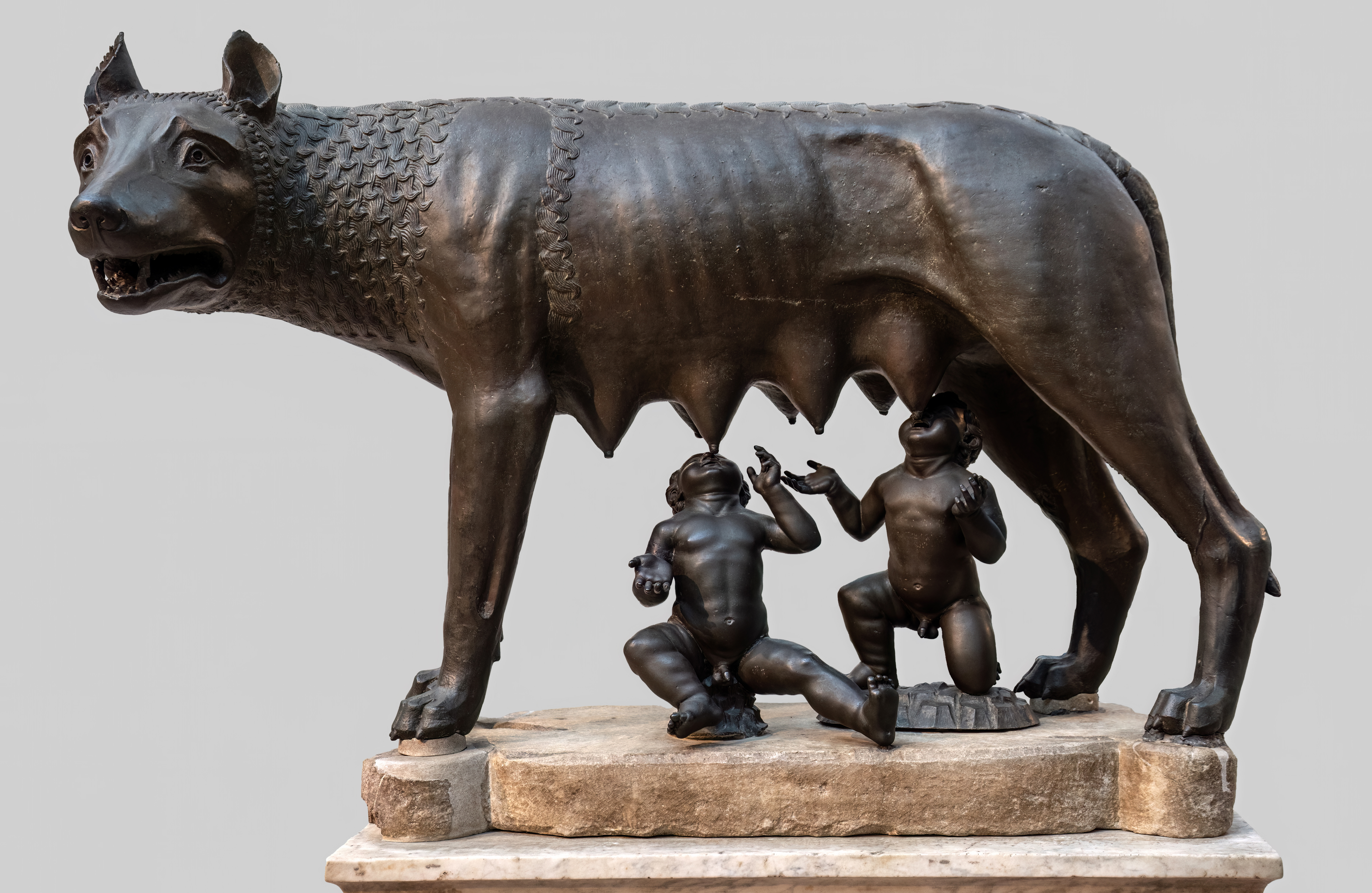
Lupa Capitolina, from the Capitoline Museums in Rome, Italy

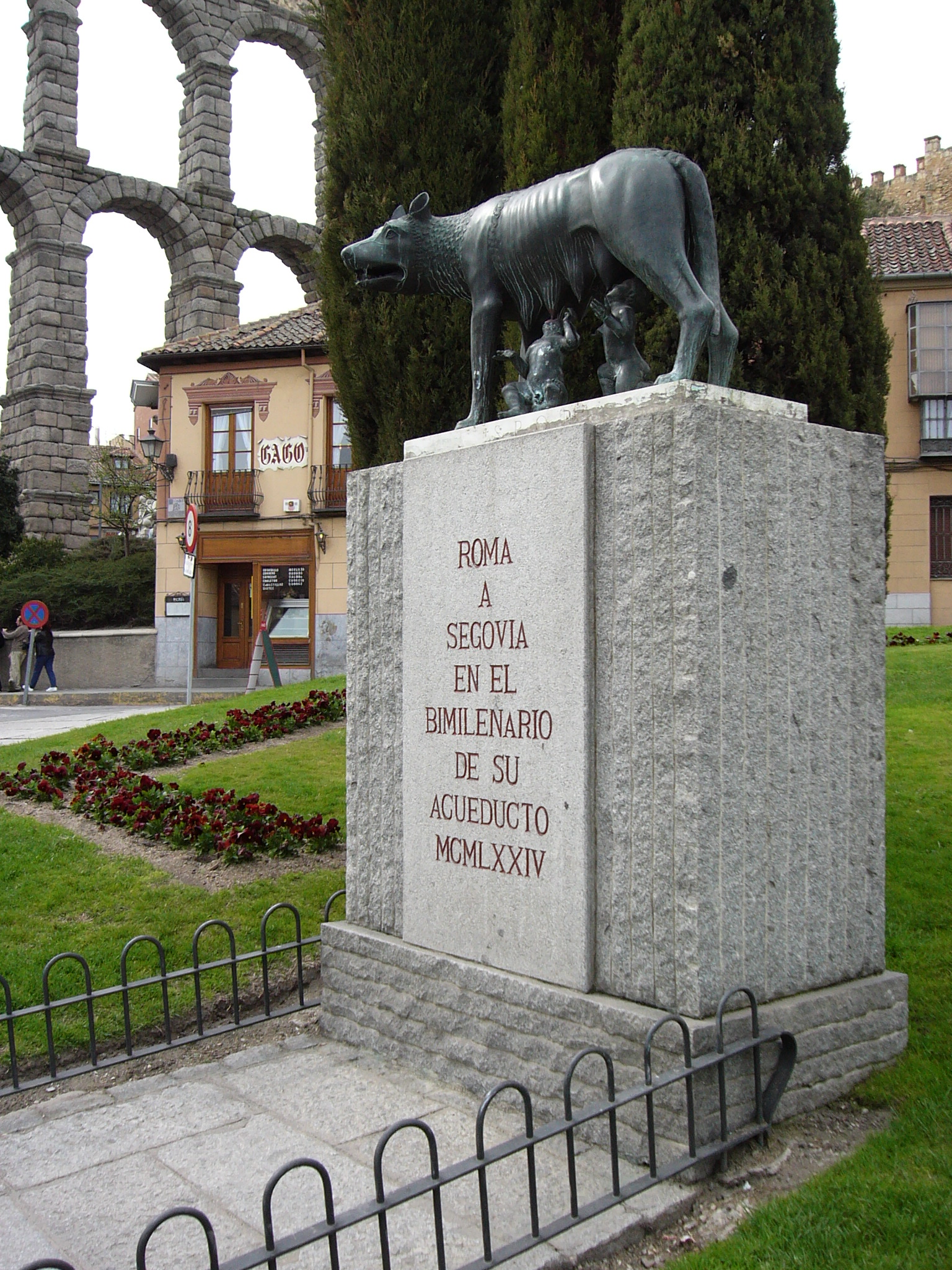
Capitoline Wolf in Segovia, Spain

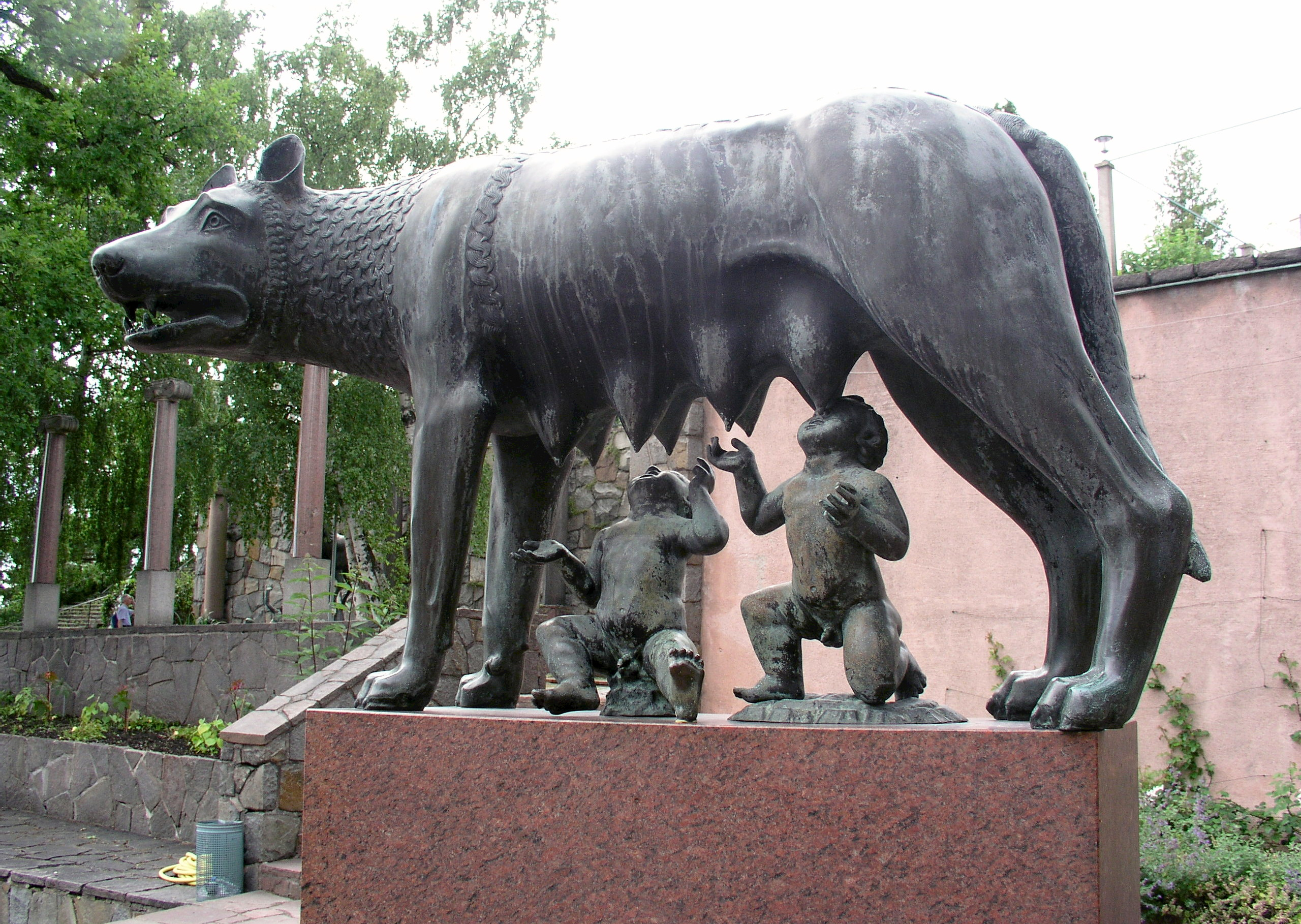
Capitoline Wolf in Lidingö, Sweden

The Capitoline Wolf suckling the twins Romulus and Remus is a symbol of Rome, Italy. Copies of the statues have been donated by Italy to various places around the world.

Below is a list of replicas of the Capitoline Wolf statue in different places of the world:

== Argentina ==
- Buenos Aires - in the Botanic Gardens and Parque Lezama.This reproduction was donated by Vittorio Emanuele III, King of Italy (1869-1947) to the Ambassador of the Argentine Republic, Dr. Roque Sáenz Peña, on the occasion of the Centenary of the May Revolution, in 1910.
- Bariloche
- Mendoza - in the Plaza de Italia
- San Martín, Mendoza - in the Plaza Italia
- Mar de Plata

== Australia ==
- Perth - in the lobby of the WA Italian Club, on Fitzgerald Street.

== Belgium ==
- Brussels - on the Mont des Arts
- La Louvière - on the Place de la Louve

== Bolivia ==
- La Paz - on the Plaza Roma, Obrajes.

== Brazil ==
- Brasília - in front of the "Palácio do Buriti", the seat of the government of the Federal District, donated by the mayor of Rome at the time of the foundation of Brasília

== Canada ==
- Toronto - in the collection of the City of Toronto
- Thunder Bay - located in the Thunder Bay Soroptimist International Friendship Garden Italian Monument

== Chile ==
- Talca - in Plaza Italia (on the crossing of Calle 11 Oriente and Calle 2 Sur), 1942. Stolen in 2010, replaced with a replica by 2013.
- Valparaíso - in Parque Italia, 1936-1937.
- Santiago

== China ==
- Changchun - in school of history and culture, Northeast Normal University. The statue was given to the town by the Italian Economic Mission in Japan in 1938 when the city (then named Xinjing) was the capital of Manchukuo. On April 27, 1952, Zhu Huan was passing through the "Datong Park" in Changchun City and found that the stone seat of the female wolf statue was in ruins. This was a gift from the Italian fascist government as a national gift to Xinjing City during the Manchukuo period. He found the bronze female wolf statue nearby and escorted the female wolf statue to the office building of the History Department of Northeastern University on Liberty Avenue.

== Finland ==
- Kotka - in the Kauppakeskus Pasaati lobby

== Guatemala ==
- Guatemala City - in front of the city hall in the civic center

== Hungary ==
- Szarvas - in front of the Bolza castle.

== Italy ==
- Rome - the original statue is in the Capitoline Museums and a copy on a pillar at the northern corner of Palazzo senatorio, and another in Piazza del Popolo.
- Pisa - on the Piazza dei Miracoli
- Siena - several sites in the city, including the Duomo
- Aquileia - in the Piazza Capitolio, next to the basilica
- Piacenza - at the beginning of via Emilia
- Reggio Emilia - in the Piazza del Popolo
- Massa Lombarda - inserted into a monument to the fallen of all wars at the entrance of the town cemetery
- Verona - inserted into a monument to the fallen of all wars in the old town walls

== Japan ==
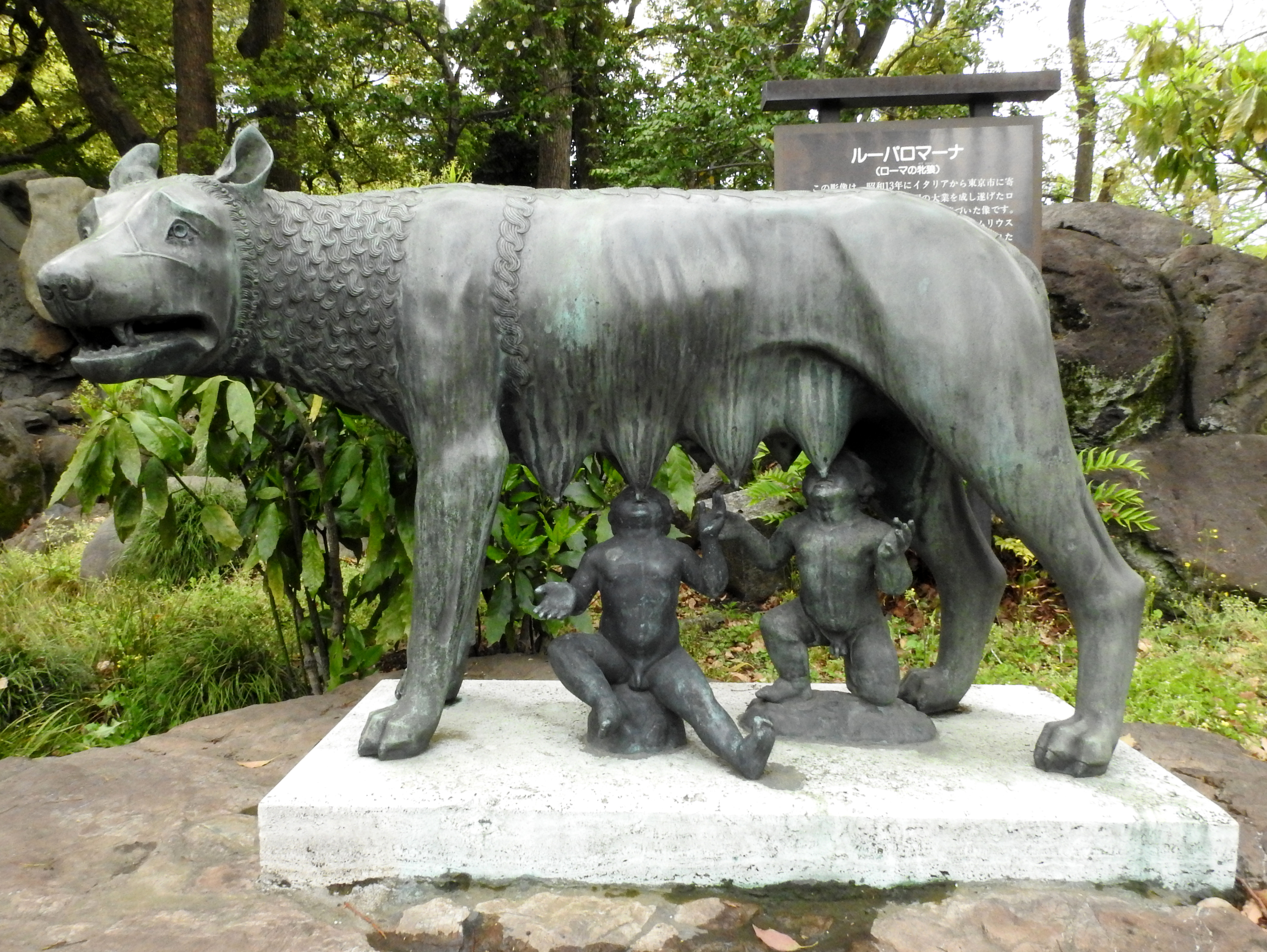
Capitoline she-wolf in Hibiya Park, Tokyo

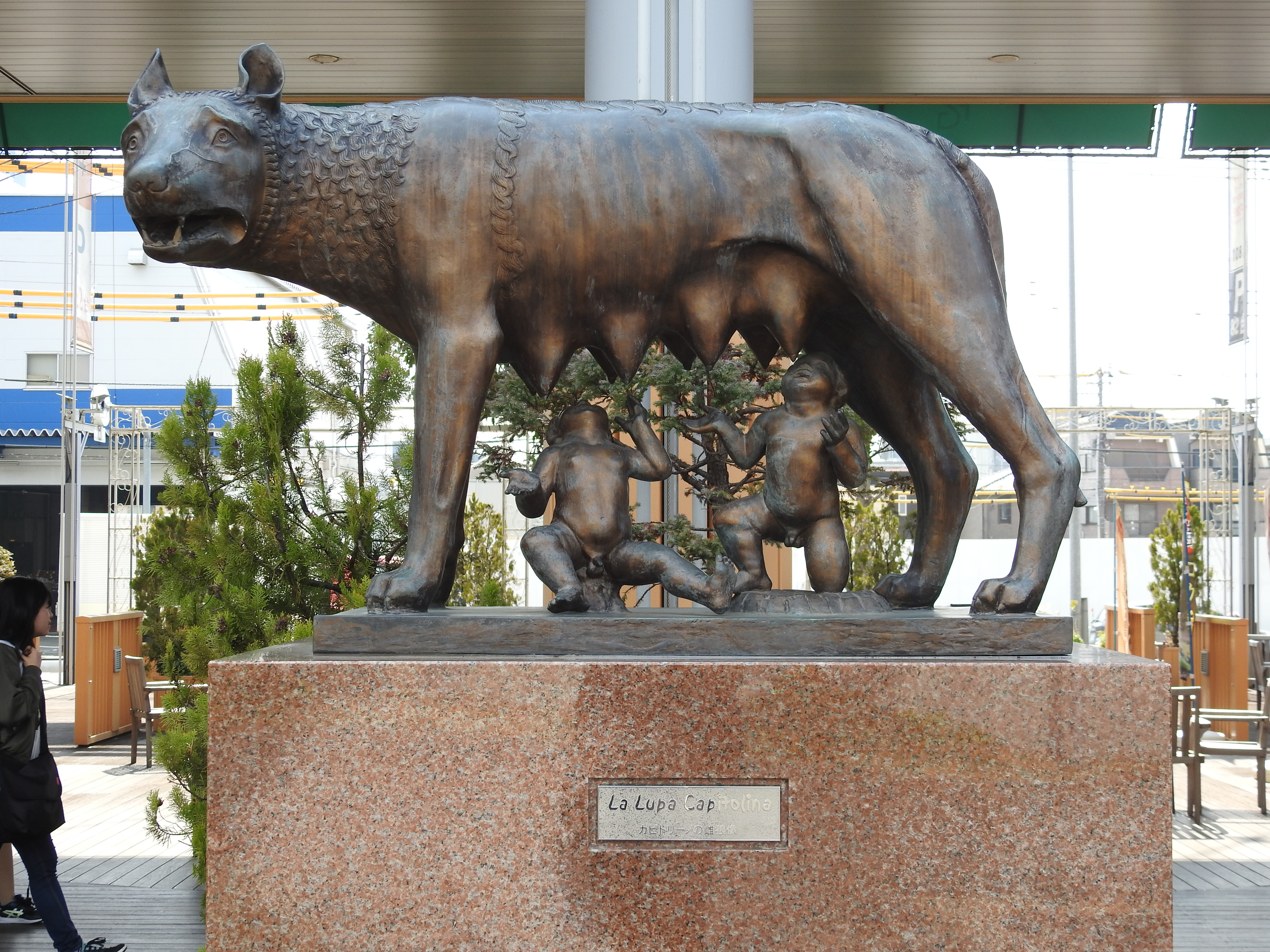
Capitoline she-wolf at Ajinomoto Stadium, Tokyo.

- Chōfu, Tokyo - in Ajinomoto Stadium, donated from the Commune of Rome in 2001.
- Chiyoda, Tokyo - in Hibiya Park, one block south of the Imperial Palace complex. It was donated by Benito Mussolini in 1938.

== Libya ==
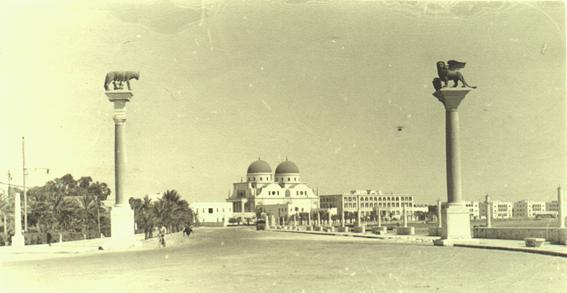
Capitoline Wolf in Benghazi, Libya, 1941.

- Benghazi - Benghazi Corniche Columns, or Romulus Benghazi. Recovered in 2023.

== Moldova ==
- Chișinău - Statue of Capitoline Wolf, Chișinău in front of National Museum of History

== New Zealand ==
- Hamilton - At the Italian Renaissance Garden entranceway in the Hamilton Gardens

== Norway ==
- Tønsberg, Vestfold

== Romania ==
Romanian Capitoline Wolf statues (Lupoaica):

- Alba Iulia - Capitoline Wolf statue in a park
- Blaj - Capitoline Wolf statue in the city center
- Brad - Capitoline Wolf statue in the city center, near the Dacian Standard

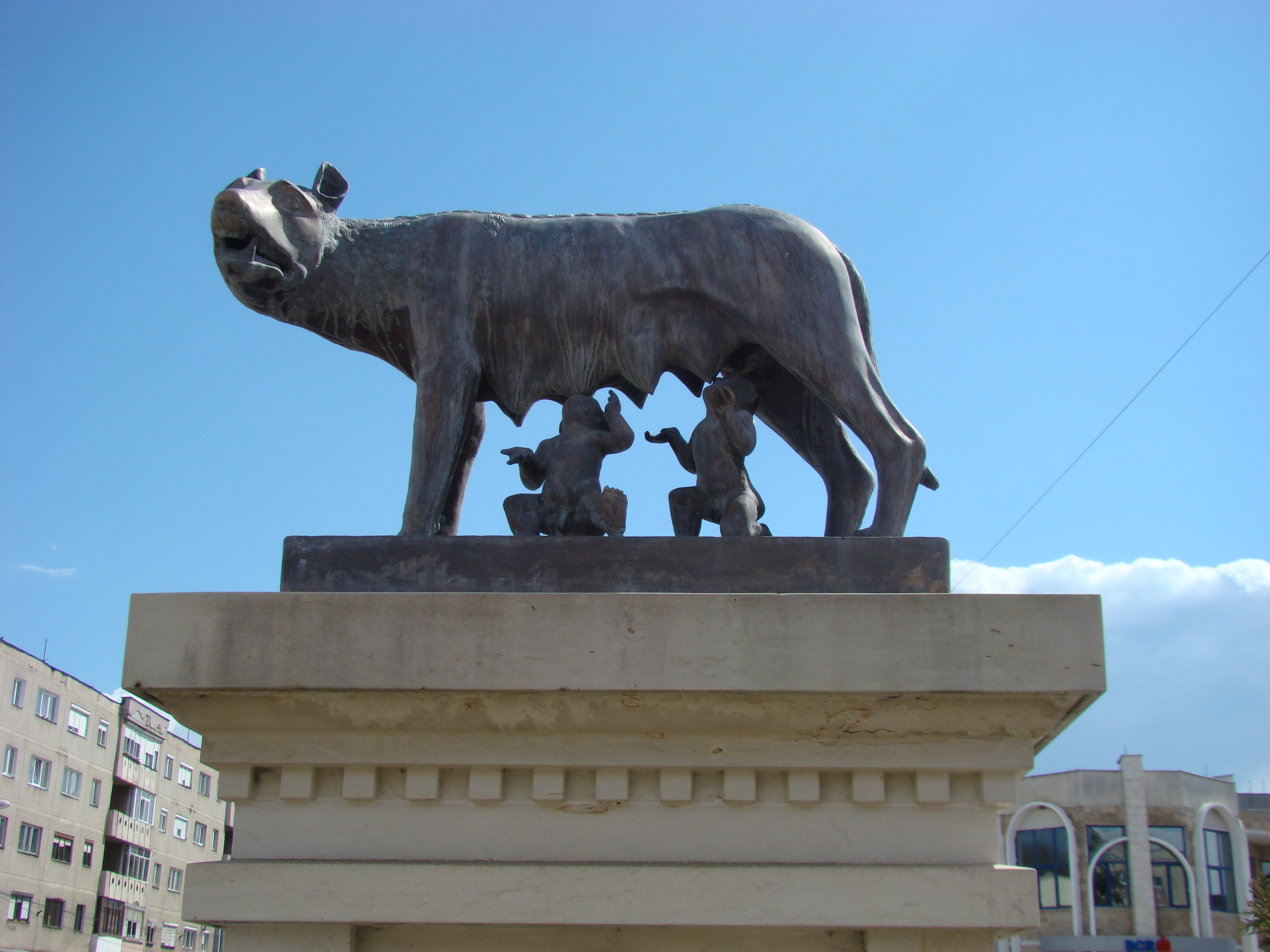
Capitoline Wolf in Brad, Romania

- Brașov - Capitoline Wolf statue in front of the City Hall
- Bucharest - Capitoline Wolf statue on Brătianu Boulevard
- Cluj-Napoca - Capitoline Wolf statue on Eroilor Boulevard
- Constanța - Capitoline Wolf statue in the historical downtown
- Cristeștii Ciceului
- Dej
- Galați - Capitoline Wolf statue in a park
- Gherla
- Iernut - Capitoline Wolf statue in the town center
- Leșu
- Luduș
- Maieru
- Năsăud
- Orăștie
- Reghin
- Săcele
- Satu Mare - Capitoline Wolf statue in the Vasile Lucaciu Park
- Sighișoara - Capitoline Wolf statue in the Oberth Square (Piața Oberth)
- Târgu Mureș - Capitoline Wolf statue in the Prefecture Square (Piața Prefecturii)
- Târnăveni
- Timișoara - Capitoline Wolf statue in front of the Orthodox Cathedral
- Toplița
- Turda - Capitoline Wolf statue in the city center
- Zalău - Capitoline Wolf statue in the central park

== Spain ==
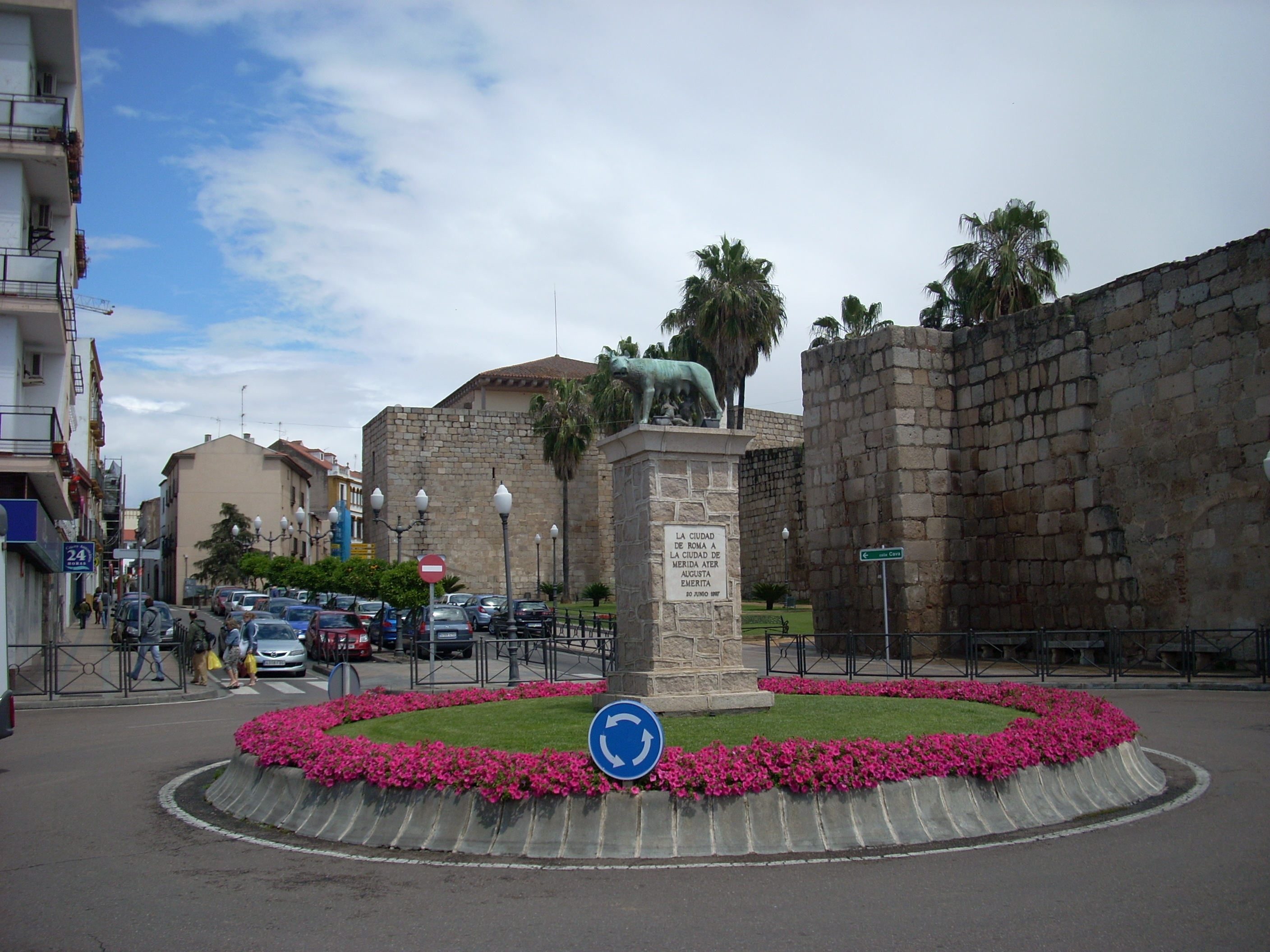
Capitoline Wolf statue in Mérida, Spain.

- Segovia: There is a Capitoline Wolf statue under the Roman aqueduct in Segovia
- Mérida: The Capitoline Wolf is near the Roman bridge of the city.
- Tarragona : There is a Capitoline wolf located inside the museum named Circ Romà
- Madrid : There is a Capitoline wolf located on the roof of the WoW Hotel in Gran Via 18 (old Roma Hotel).

== Sweden ==
- Millesgården, Lidingö

== Switzerland ==
- Fribourg - In front of the Miséricorde Building of the University of Fribourg

== Tajikistan ==
- Shahriston - There is a Capitoline Wolf statue near Istaravšan, Soghd, which memorializes a wolf drawing found in the region.

== United Kingdom ==
- Wells, Somerset - Statue of Romulus and Remus beside the A39 a little north of the city. Sculpted by an Italian prisoner-of-war in World War II.
- Plymouth - Saltram House

== United States ==
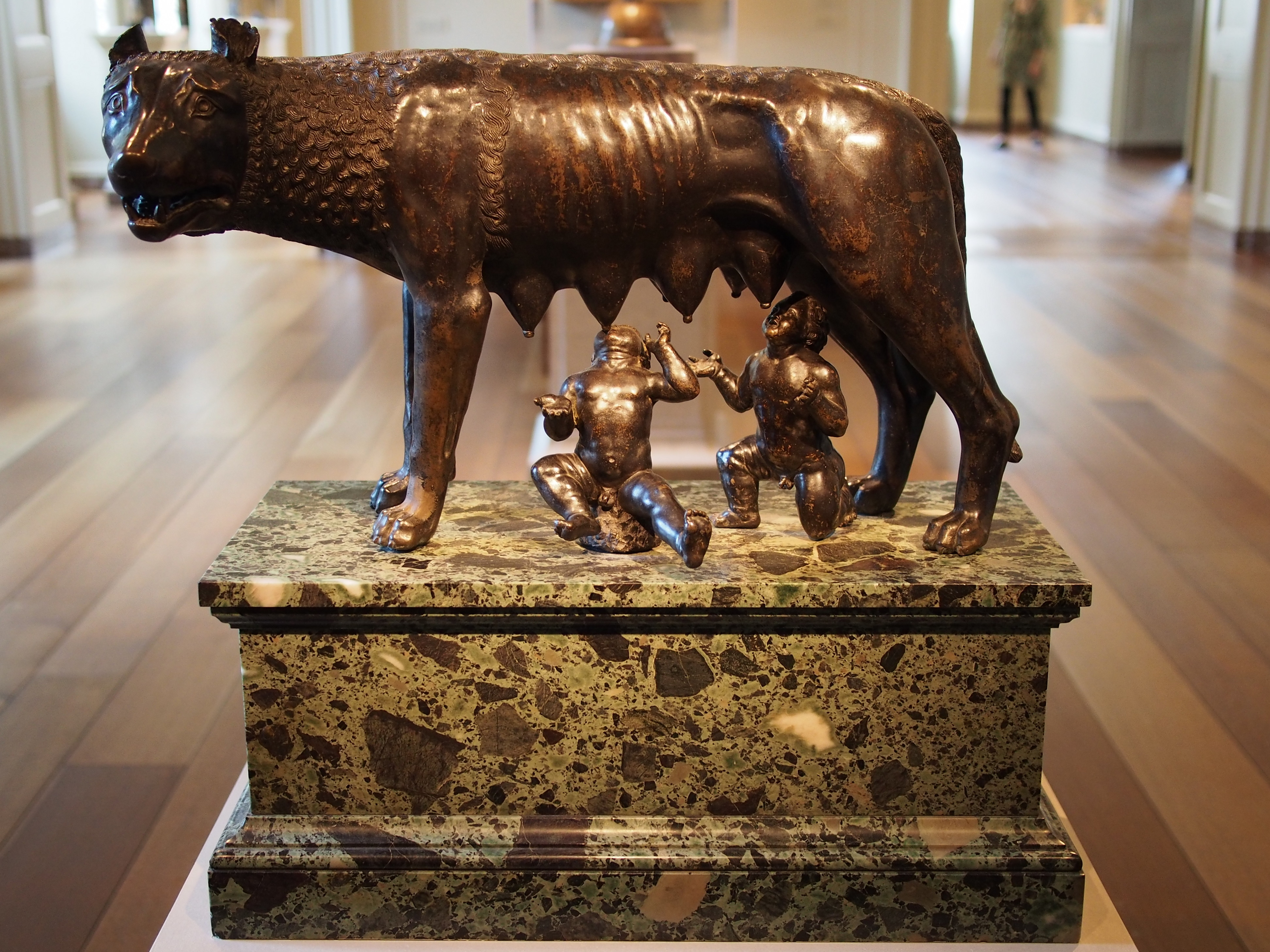
Central Italian/Roman Italian. From the National Gallery of Art in Washington, D.C. 15th or 16th Century.

- Chicago, Illinois - Located in the Ogden Avenue
- Boston, Massachusetts - interior entrance to Boston Latin School
- Cincinnati, Ohio - Capitoline Wolf Statue, Cincinnati
- Cleveland, Ohio
- Del Rio, Texas - Located at the Brinkley Circle, home of Dr. John Romulus Brinkley
- Austin, Texas - Located at the Blanton Museum of Art at The University of Texas at Austin
- New York City, New York - Located in the Riverdale neighborhood of The Bronx on the grounds of the Hebrew Home for the Aged
- Rome, Georgia - at the entrance to the Rome City Auditorium. Unveiled April 21 1929 on the 2,683rd anniversary of the founding of Rome
- Rome, New York- Located at The Beeches Conference Center and Restaurant
- Sault Ste. Marie, Michigan - located in front of the Chippewa County courthouse
- Tulsa, Oklahoma - in the gardens of the Philbrook Museum
- Washington, DC - on the ground floor of the National Gallery of Art

== Uruguay ==
- Montevideo - on the crossing of Bulevar Artigas and Av. 8 de Octubre
- Florida
- Punta del Este - on the crossing of Avenida Italia and Av. Petragosa Sierra

== Gallery ==
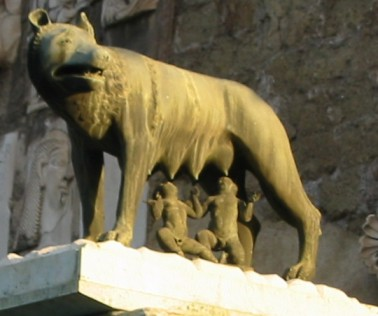
Siena, Italy

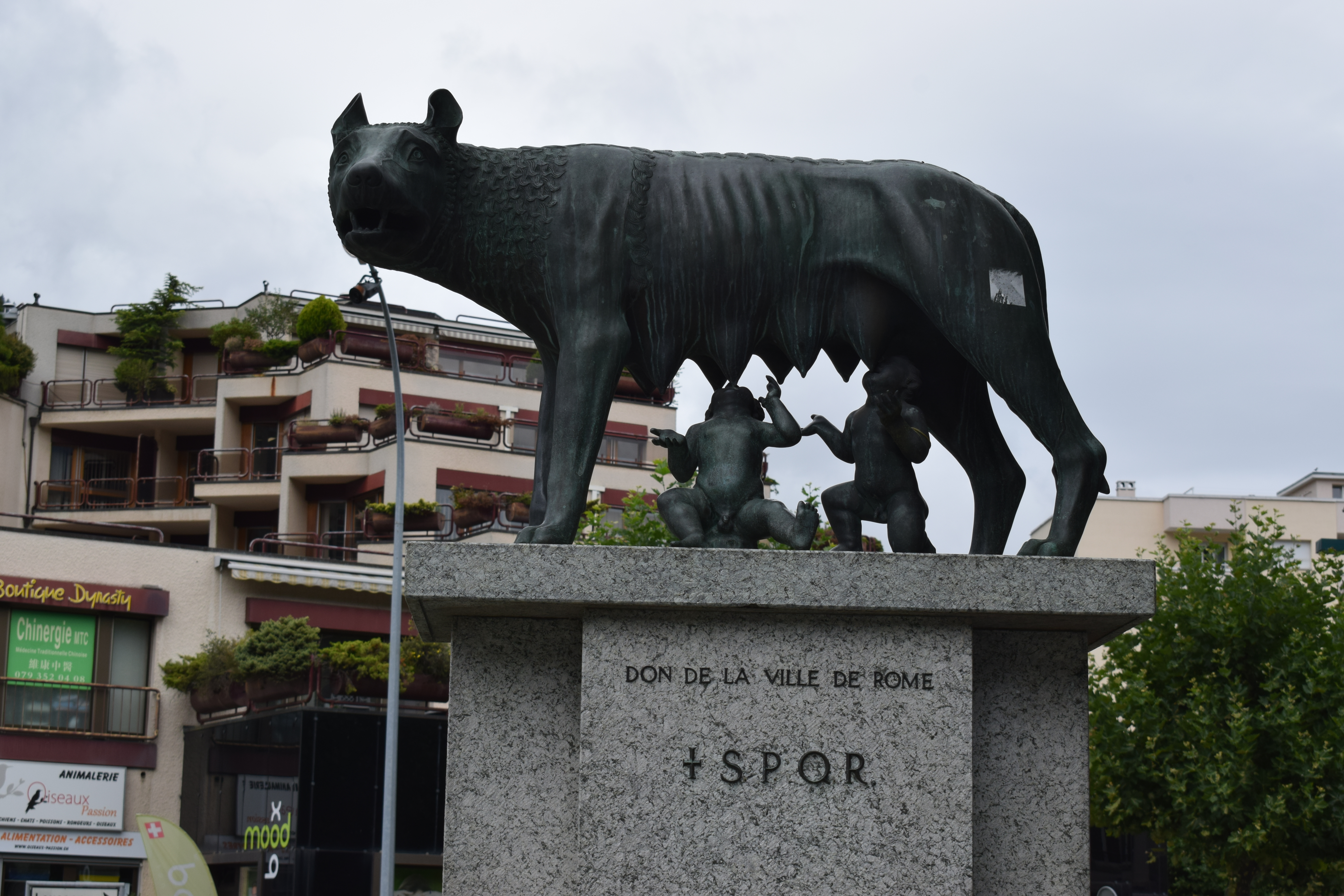
Martigny, Switzerland

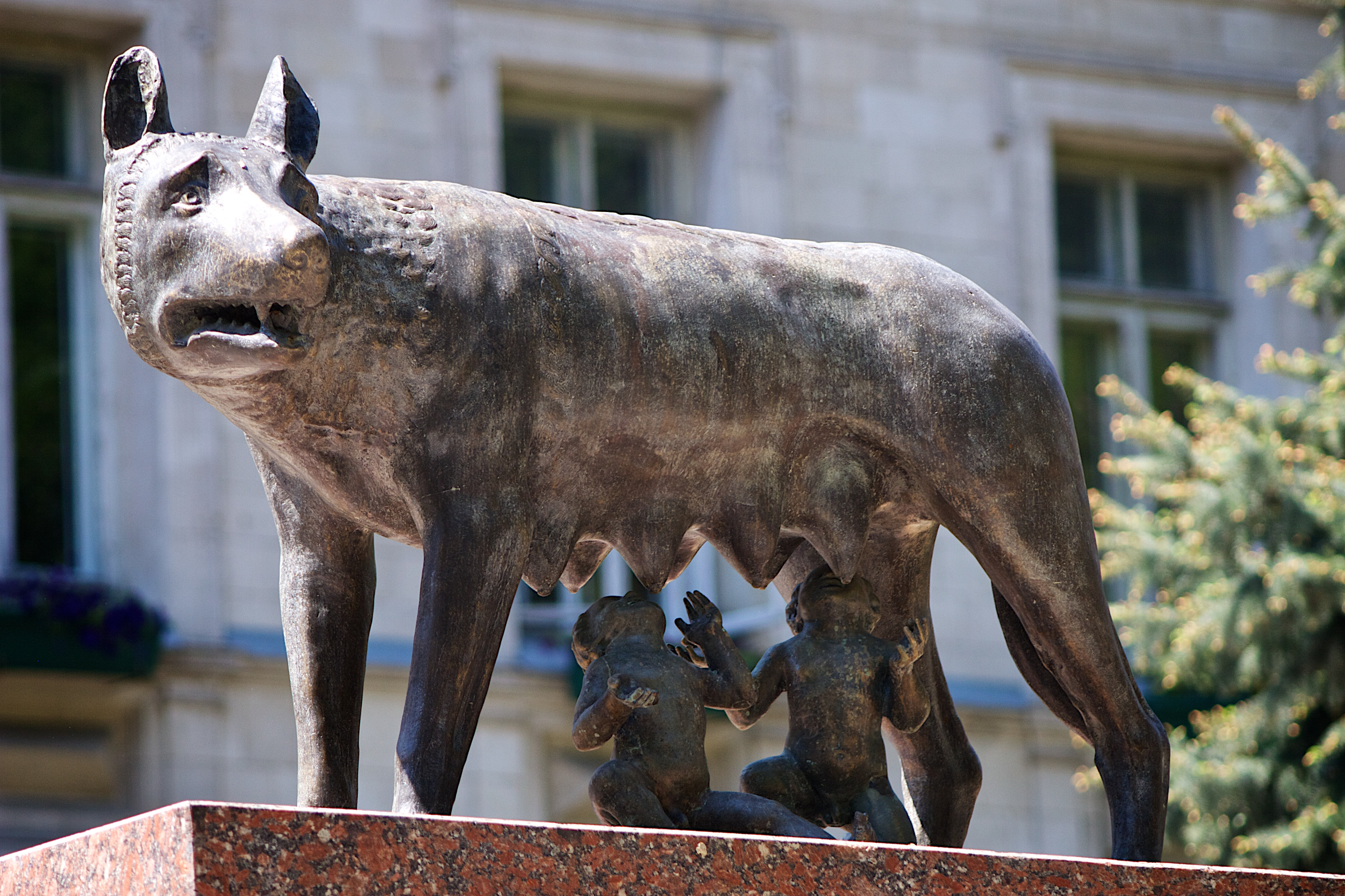
Chișinău, Moldavia

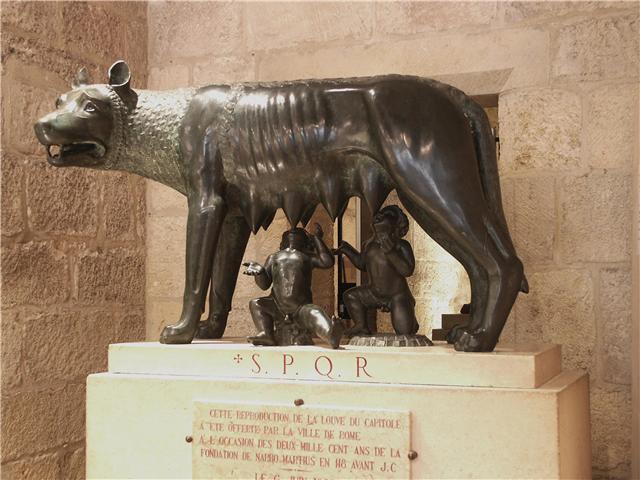
Narbonne, France

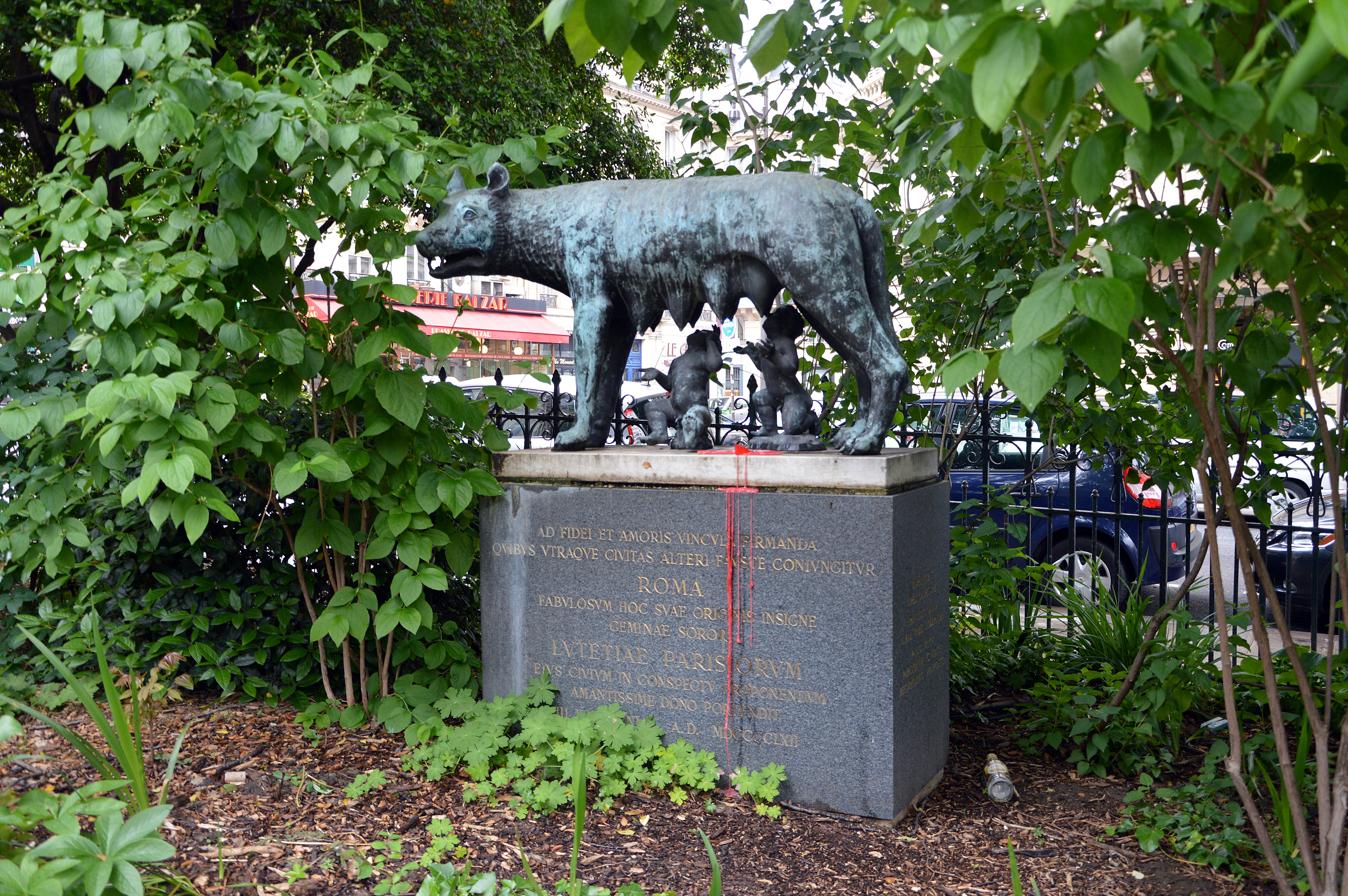
Paris, France

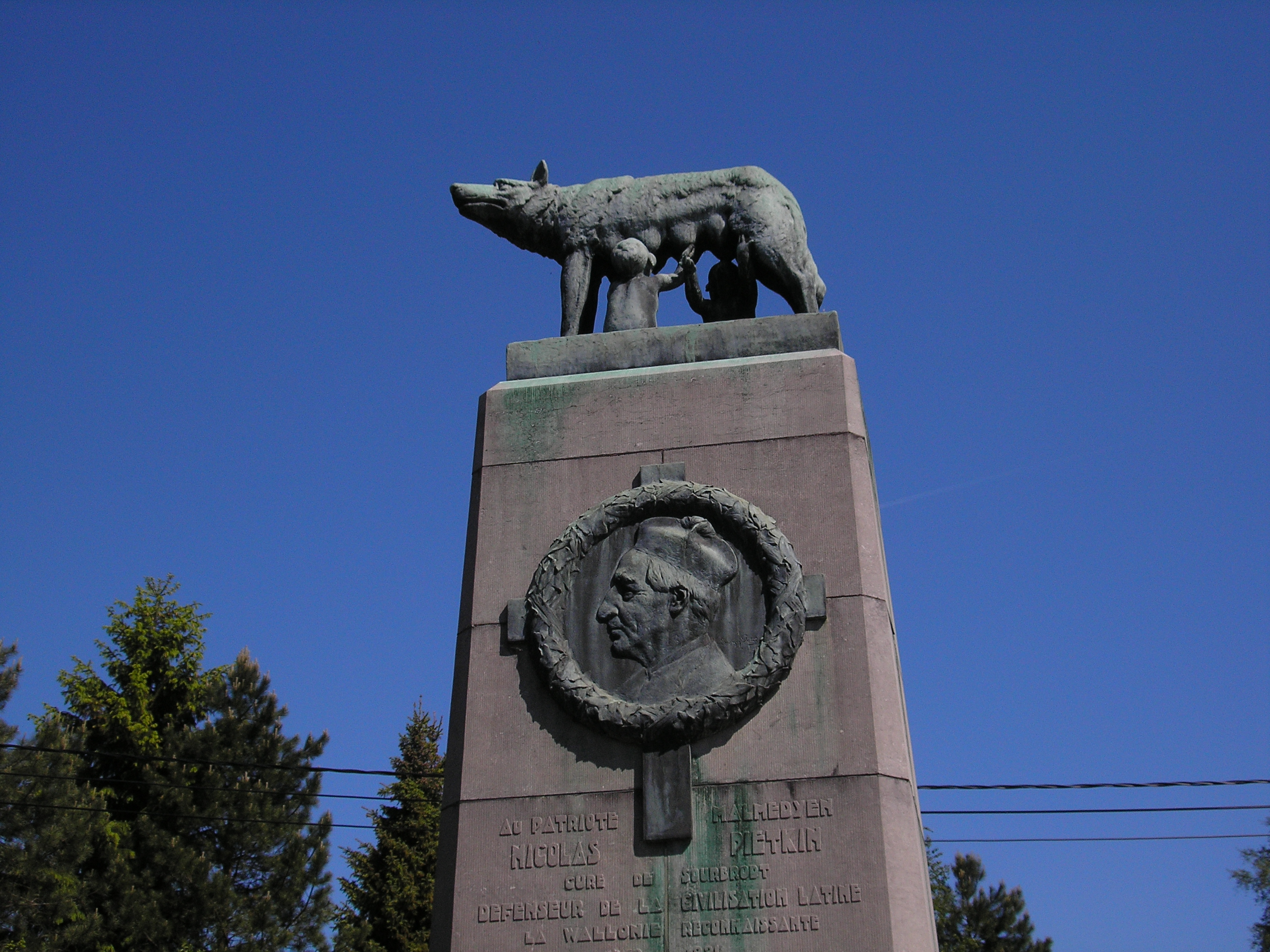
Sourbrodt, Belgium

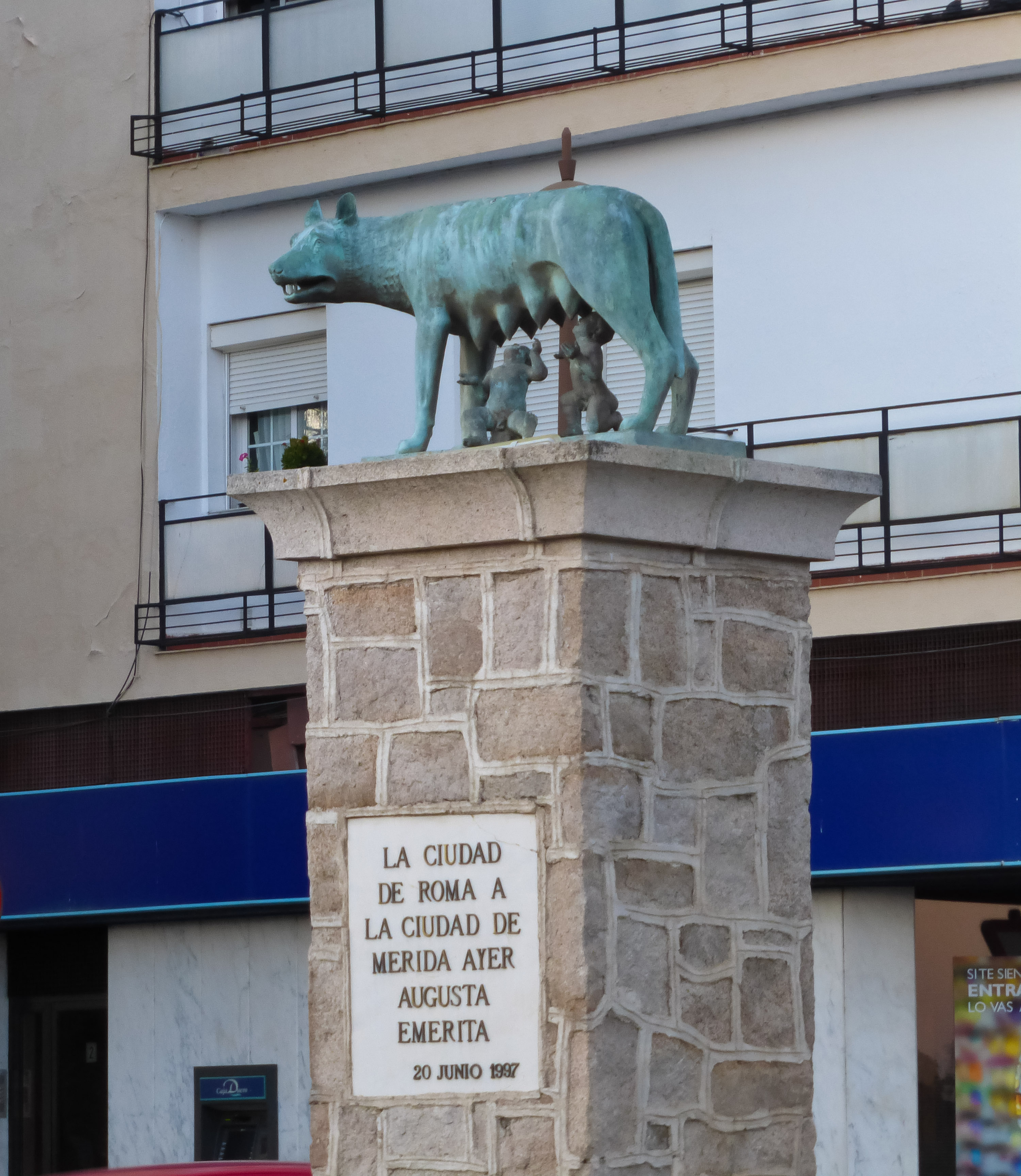
Mérida, Spain

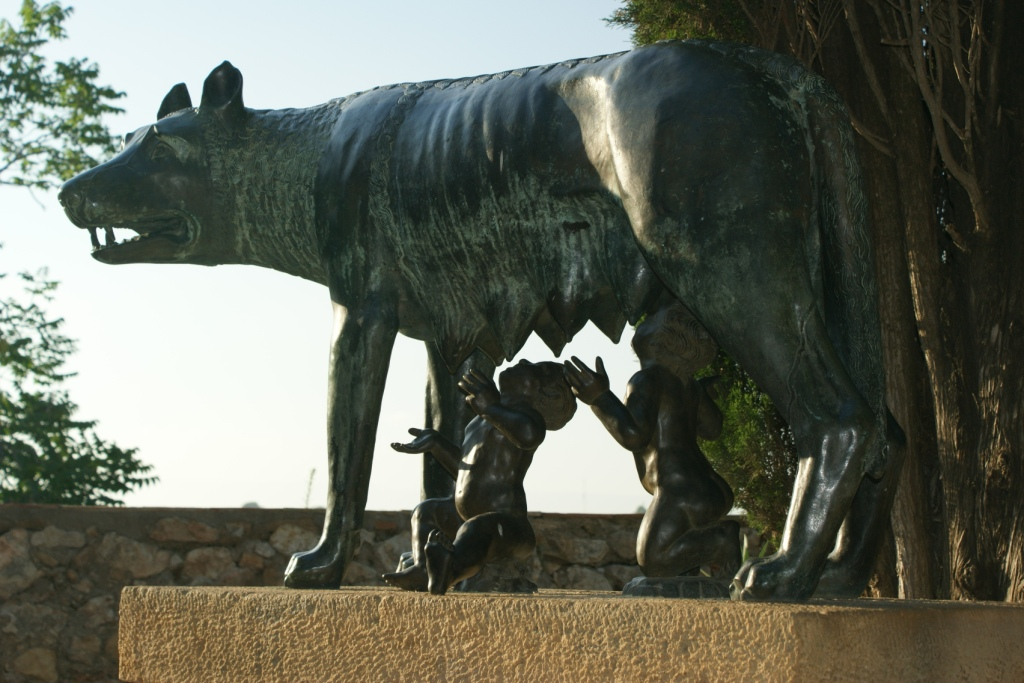
Tarragona, Spain

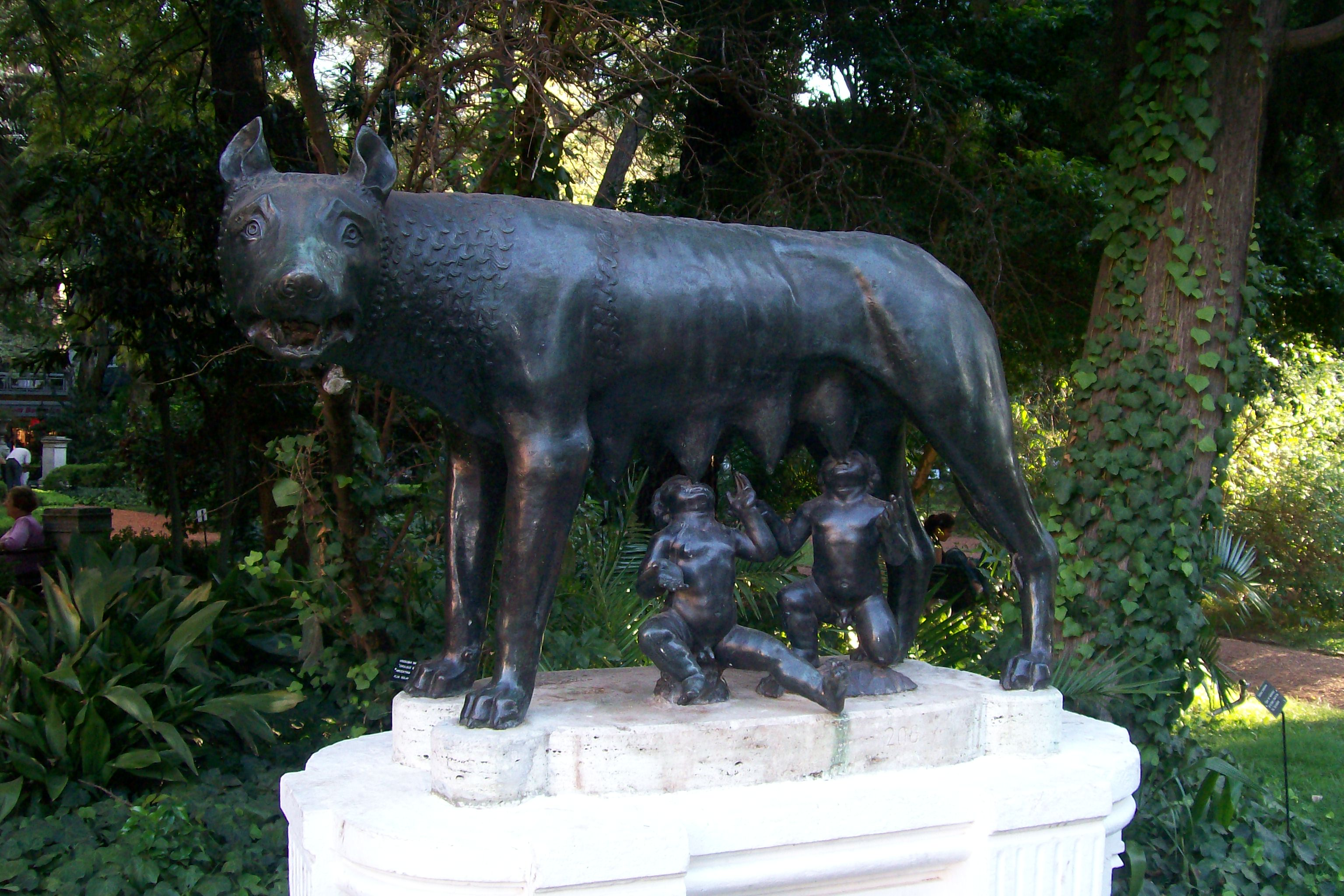
Buenos Aires, Argentina

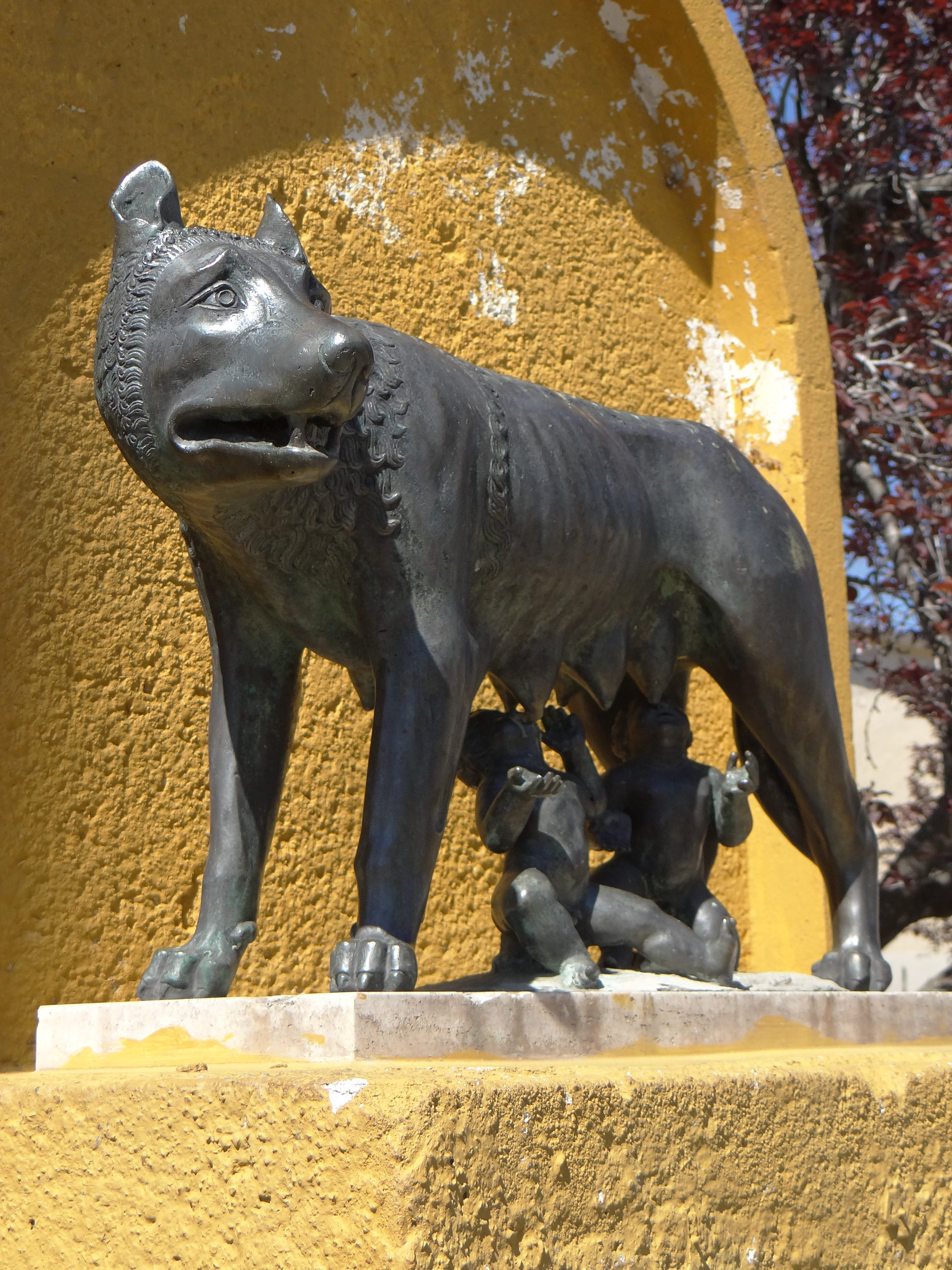
Florida, Uruguay

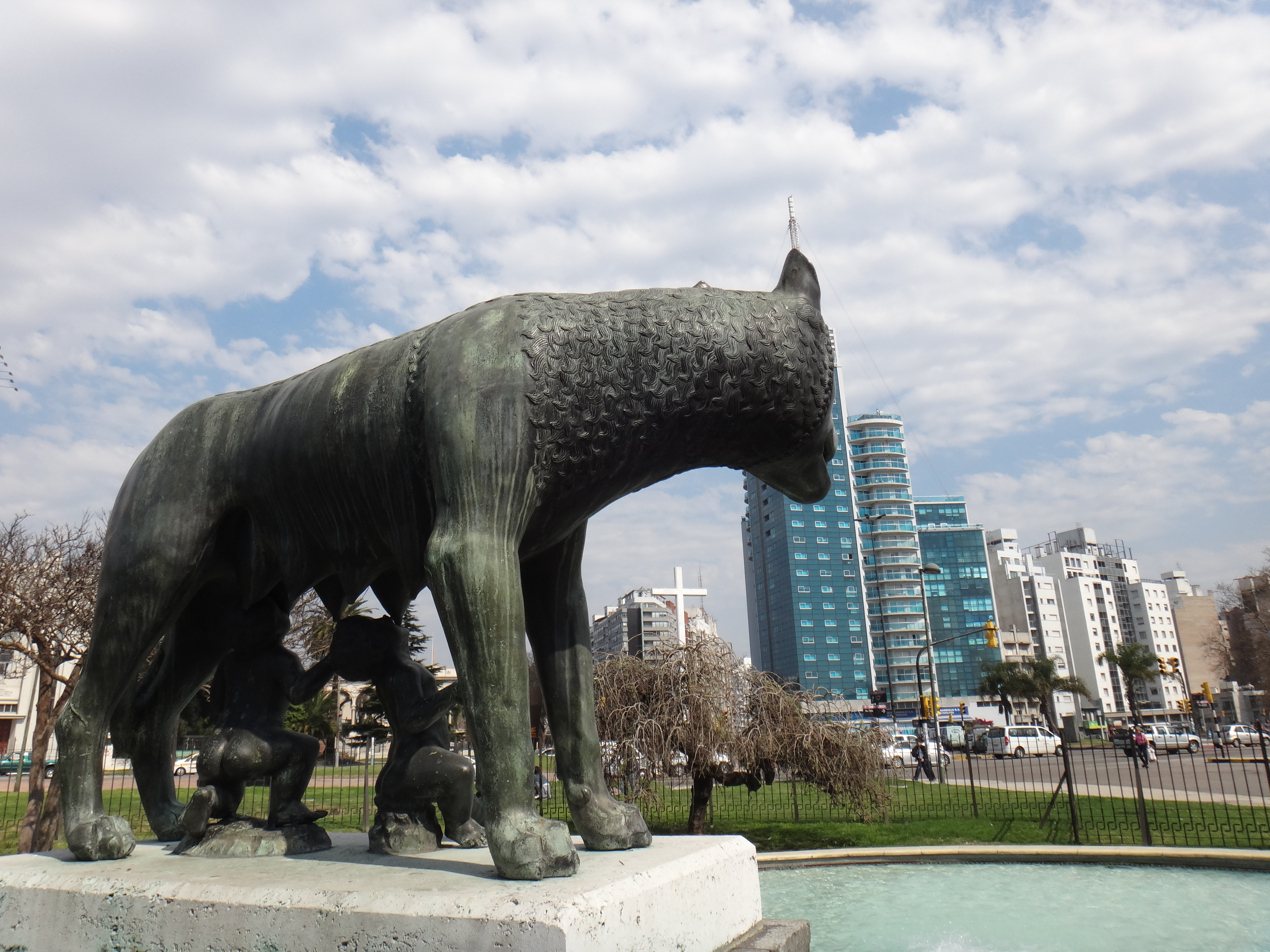
Montevideo, Uruguay

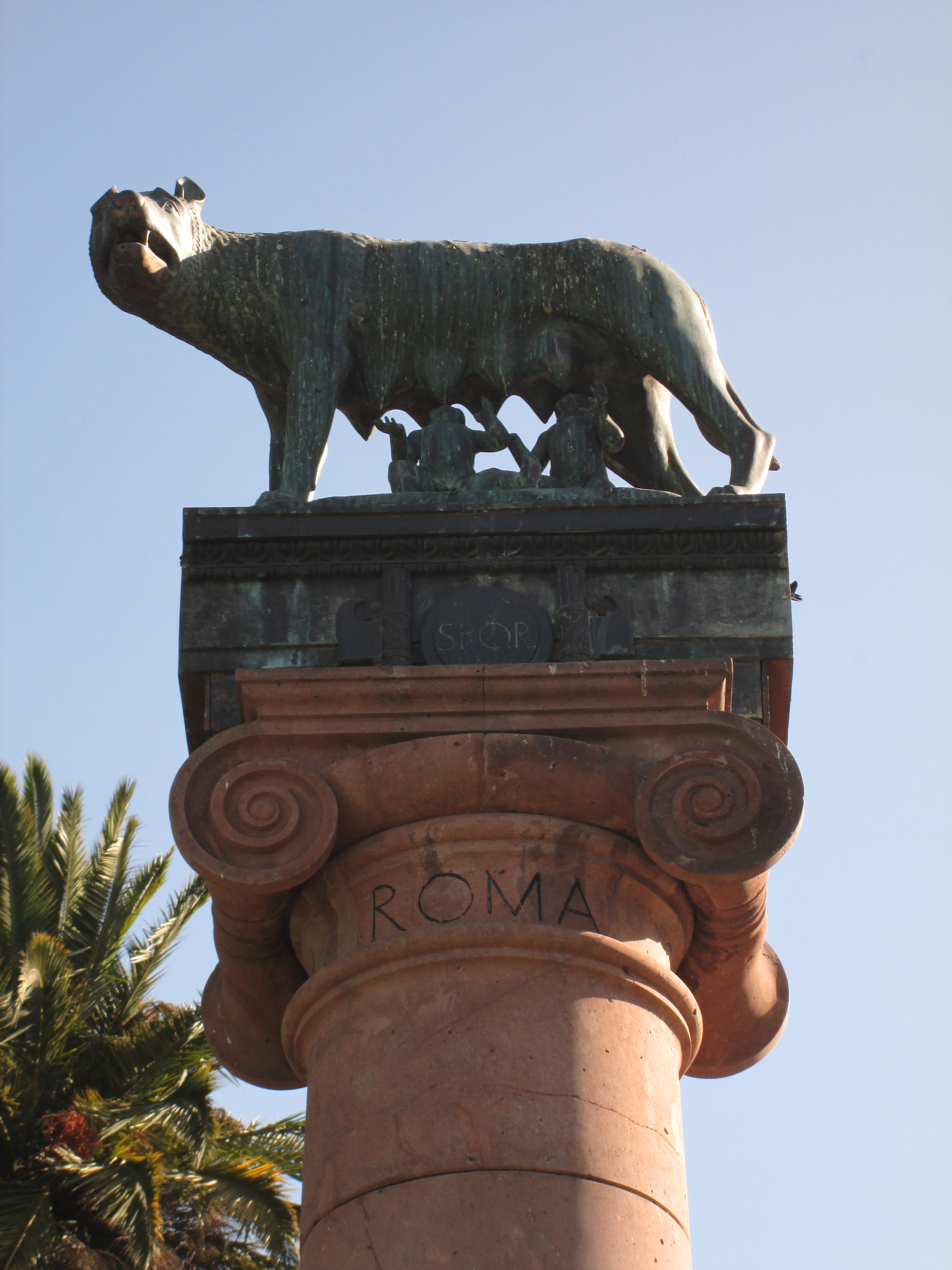
Valparaiso, Chile

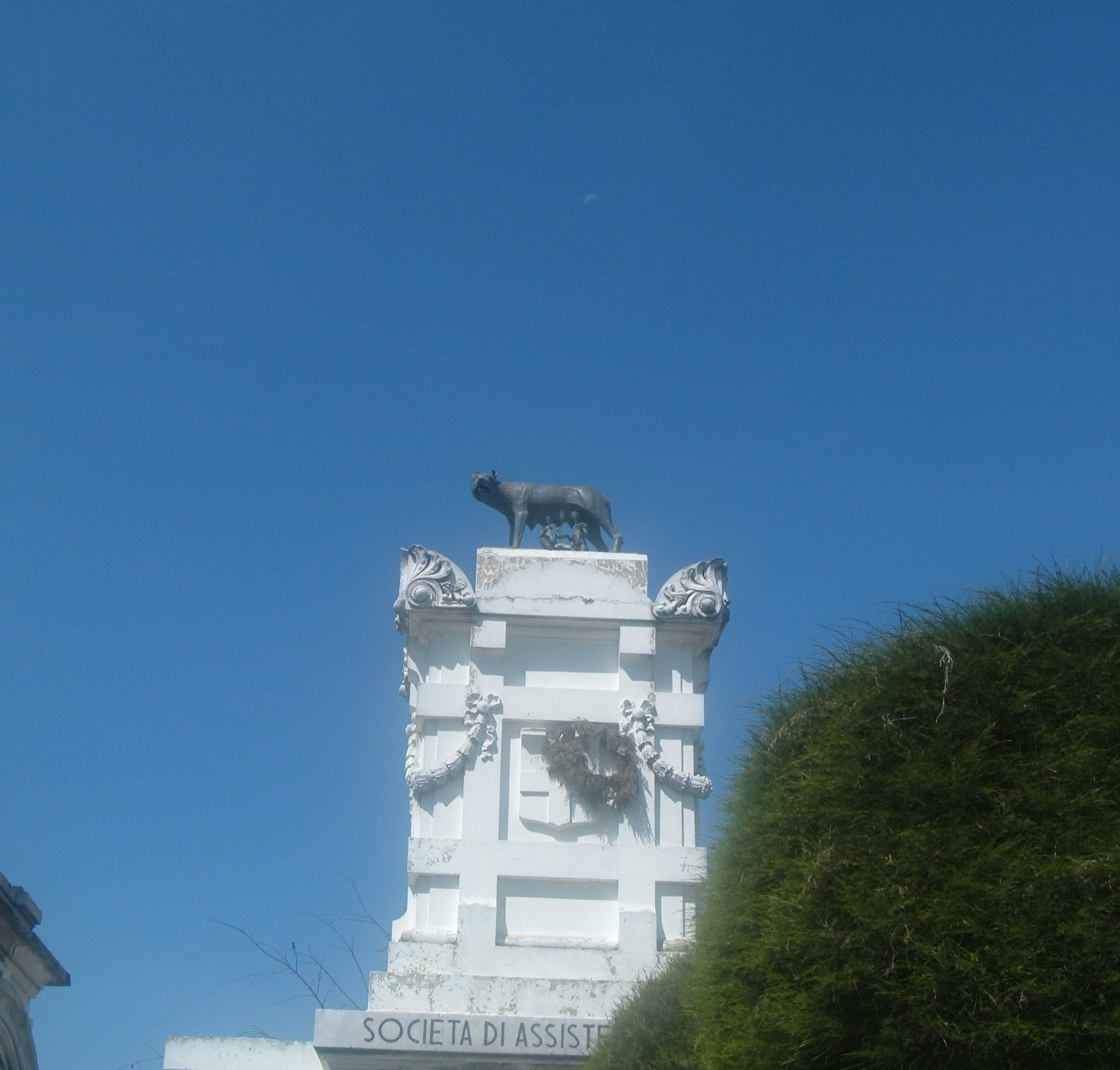
San Salvador, El Salvador

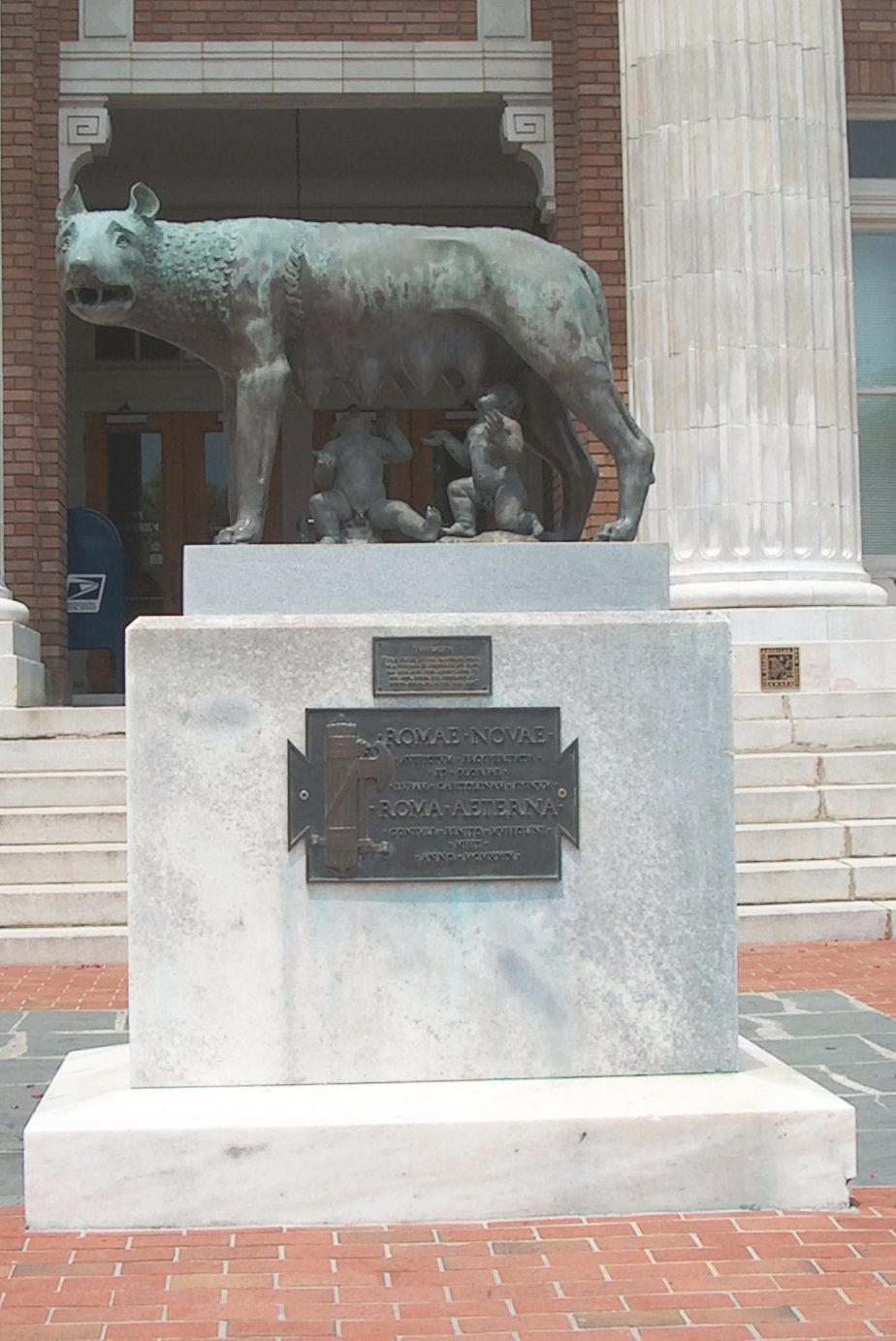
Georgia, United States

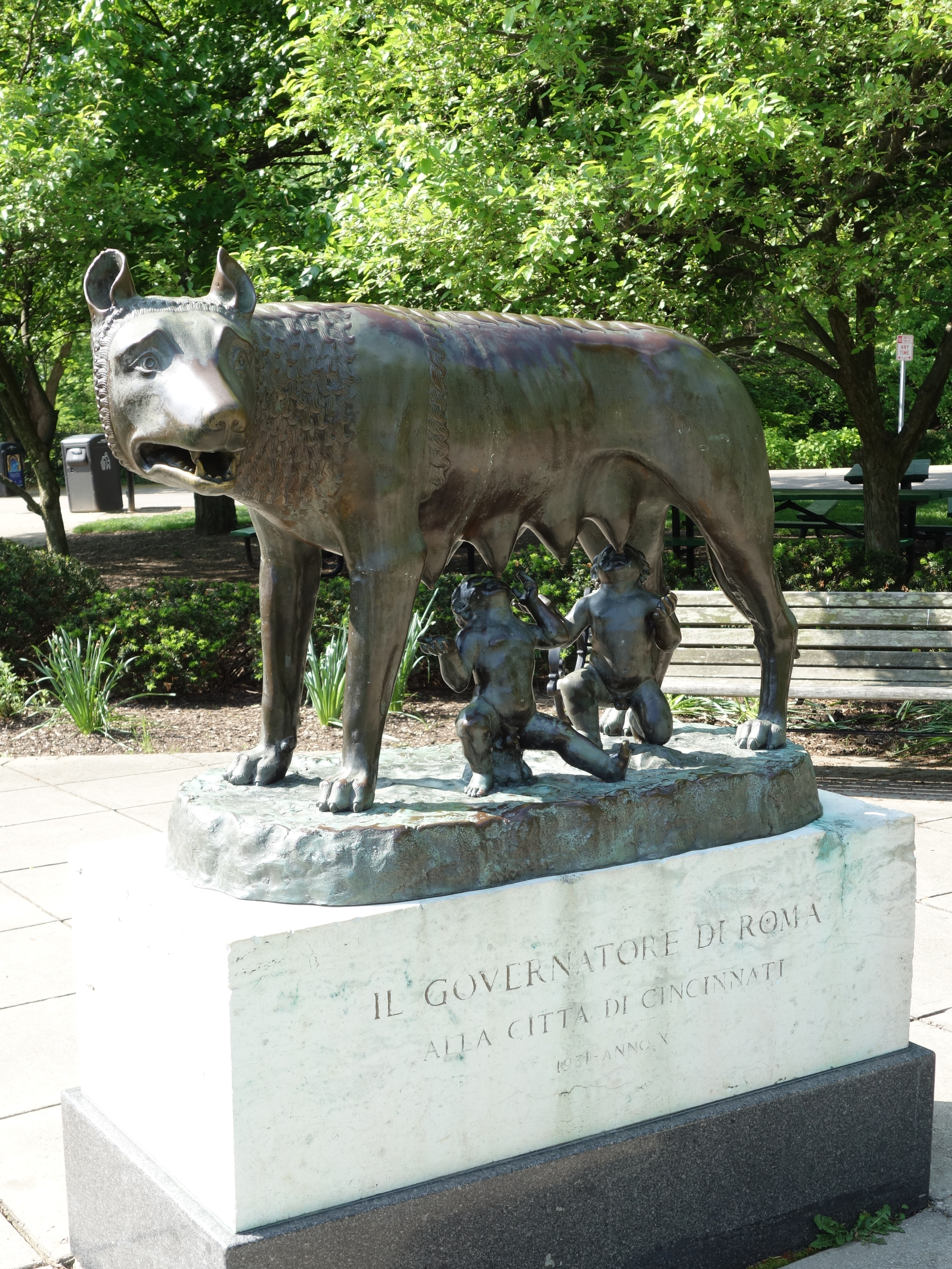
Cincinnati, United States
