= Capitoline Wolf Statue, Cincinnati =

Replica of Roman statue in Cincinnati, Ohio

Coordinates: 39°07′03″N 84°29′17″W

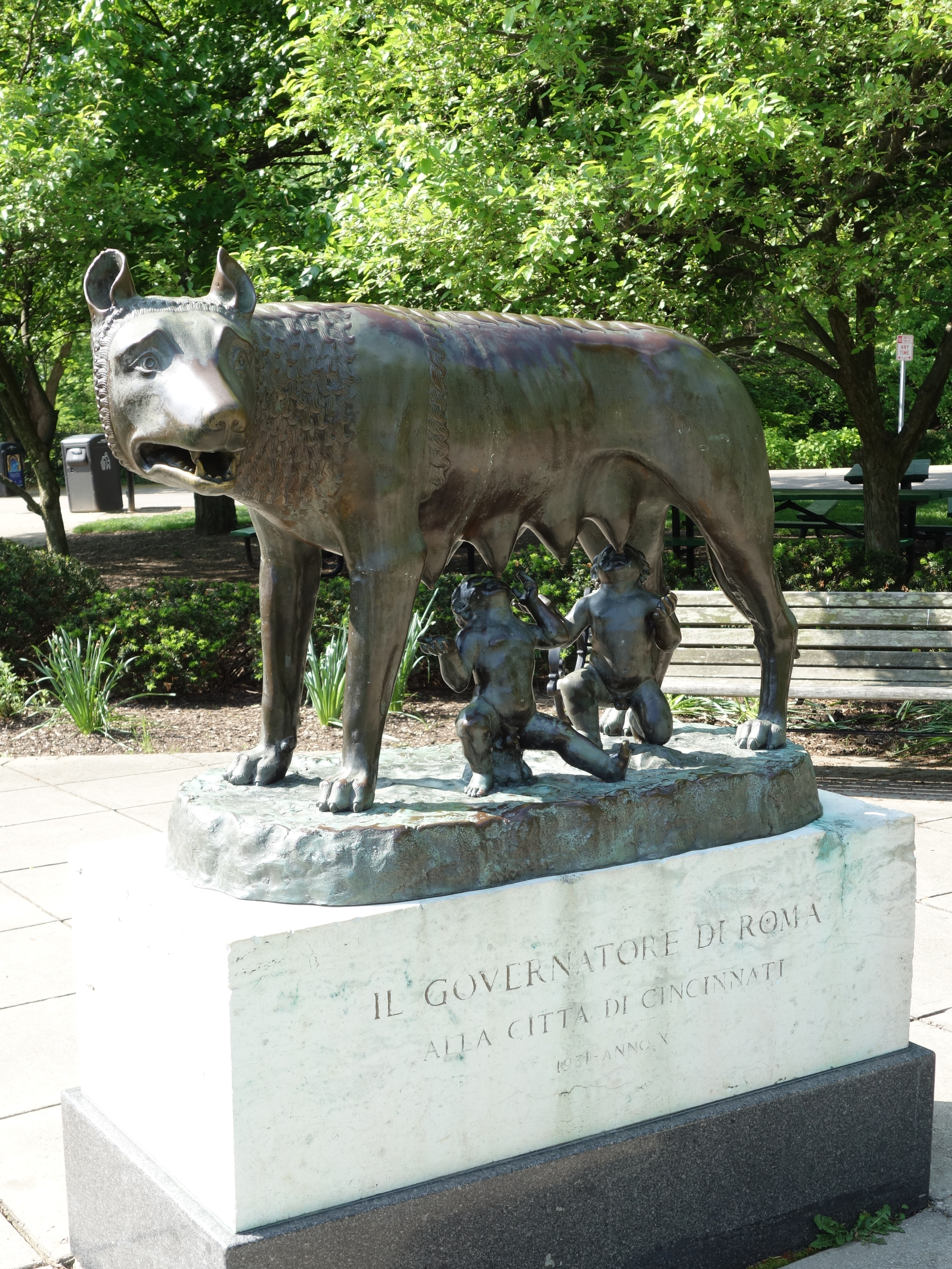
The original Capitoline Wolf statue in Cincinnati, shown in 2013 prior to its theft

The Capitoline Wolf Statue is a bronze sculpture of a she-wolf nursing Romulus and Remus in Cincinnati, Ohio, United States. A replica of the original Capitoline Wolf, the first version of the statue was given to Cincinnati in 1929 by Italian dictator Benito Mussolini before being replaced by a larger one in 1931. Stolen in 2022, the statue was replaced the following year.

== Description and creation ==
The bronze sculpture is located in Eden Park at the Twin Lakes area overlooking the Ohio River. It is a replica of the original Capitoline Wolf in the Musei Capitolini of Rome, Italy. The statue weighs 500 pounds. The upper portion of its base is made of white marble, while the lower portion consists of black granite. The base's Italian inscription reads "Il Governatore di Roma/Alla citta di Cincinnati/1931 - Anno X" ("The Governor of Rome to the city of Cincinnati 1931 - Year ten").

Italian dictator Benito Mussolini sent a small version of the statue for a 1929 Sons of Italy national convention in Cincinnati. It was replaced by a larger one in 1931, which was not dedicated until 1932. The sculpture was meant to honor Cincinnatus, the namesake of Cincinnati. The "governor of Rome" mentioned in its inscription is Francesco Boncompagni Ludovisi, who was the statue's official donor. 1931 – Anno X in the inscription references the Era Fascista calendar that counted the years from the beginning of Mussolini's regime. The inclusion of 1931 as the tenth year of the Era Fascista in the inscription is a mistake, as the actual year of Mussolini's ascension to power was 1922.

== Proposed removal ==
On January 6, 2020, Cincinnati City Council member Chris Seelbach tweeted that he wanted the statue to be removed. Seelbach stated "Statues from the monster that was Benito Mussolini don’t belong in our parks. Museums? Maybe. But not Cincinnati Parks. I’m drafting legislation tomorrow to have the statue permanently removed". Shortly afterwards, Seelbach indefinitely delayed his plans to have the statue removed, saying "There’s been a lot of feedback about removing the statue from Eden Park. Instead of introducing legislation today to remove it, I’ll continue to listen and have conversations with all interested parties before making any formal decisions on its potential future".

== Theft and replacement ==
The wolf portion of the statue was reported stolen on June 17, 2022. Cut off at the ankles, the statues of Romulus and Remus were left. According to Councilman Jeff Cramerding, the Cincinnati Police believed that the statue was stolen so that it could be used as scrap. He also announced that he would file a motion to offer $50,000 "for information that leads to the safe return of the wolf". Cincinnati Police "exhausted all leads" regarding the theft and failed to identify those responsible or recover the statue.

A replacement statue was produced near Florence, Italy. It was created using the same mold as the original statue while using the original statue's paws. The replacement was funded by the Order Sons and Daughters of Italy, who raised $60,000 for the project. The new she-wolf statue arrived in Cincinnati on August 24, 2023 and was unveiled on November 3. Director of Cincinnati Parks Jason Barron stated that the reference to Mussolini's Era Fascista in the statue's inscription would not be removed, but would be permitted to "fade a bit".

== See also ==
- List of Capitoline Wolf statues
