= Capitoline Wolf Statue, Cluj-Napoca =

Statue in Cluj-Napoca, Romania

Capitoline Wolf Statue
- Statuia Lupoaicei
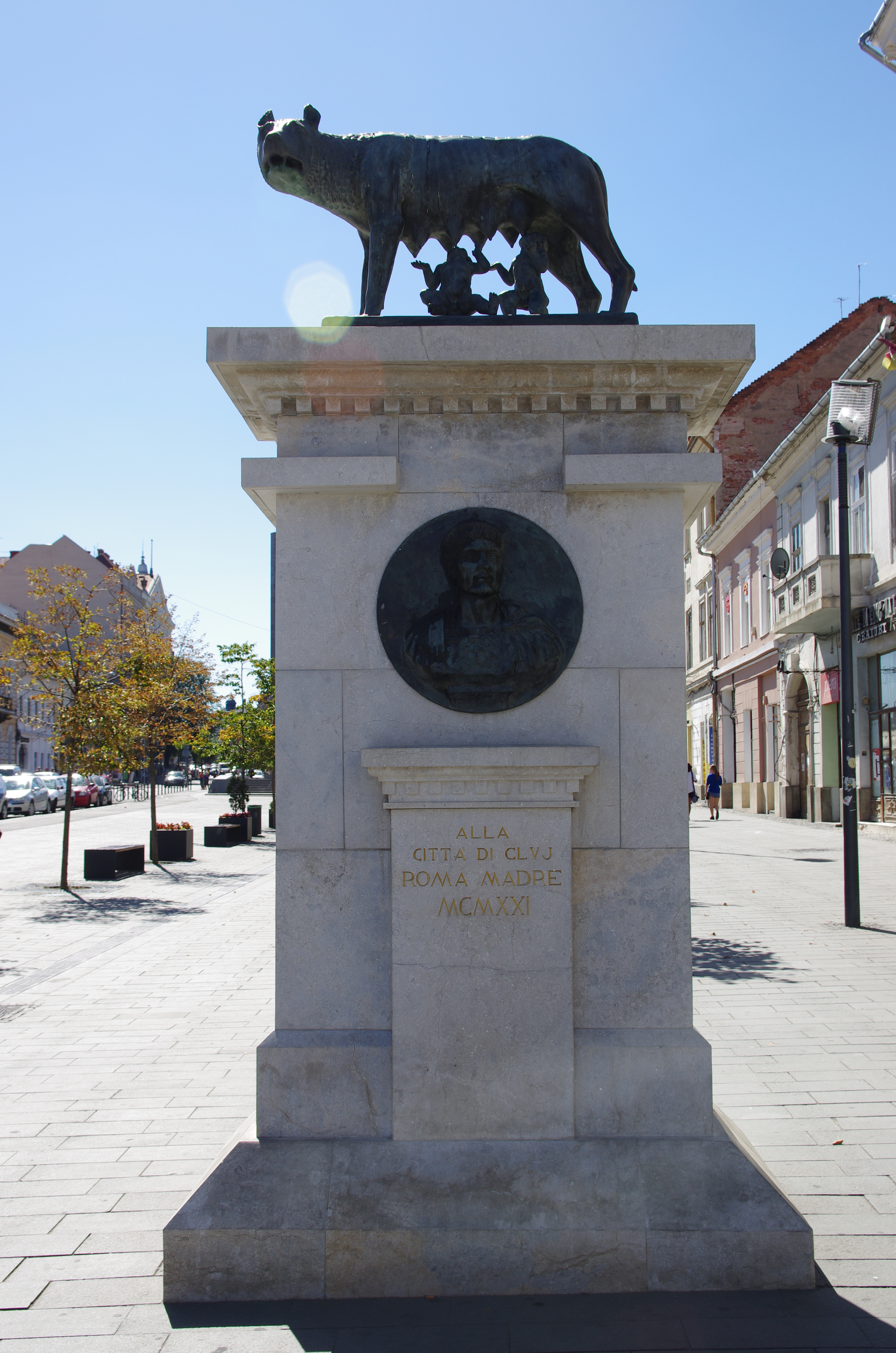
- Interactive map of Capitoline Wolf Statue
- Location: 28 Eroilor Boulevard, Cluj-Napoca
- Coordinates: 46°46′10″N 23°35′32″E
- Designer: Ettore Ferrari
- Completion date: 1921
- Opening date: 28 September 1921

The Capitoline Wolf Statue (Romanian: Statuia Lupoaicei) in Cluj-Napoca, Romania, is located on Eroilor Boulevard, in the city centre on the banks of the Someșul Mic River.

== Overview ==
After the Union of Transylvania with Romania of 1 December 1918, the University of Upper Dacia was organised at Cluj, ultimately being renamed King Ferdinand I University. It was officially opened on 1 February 1920 in the presence of King Ferdinand I and of the royal family. Representatives of the Allies of World War I and of countries neutral during the First World War were also present.

The following year, the Italian state made a gift to the city of Cluj a copy of the Capitoline Wolf, after it had already given one to Bucharest in 1906 and another one to Chișinău in 1921. In the following years a fourth would be sent to Timișoara and a fifth to Târgu Mureș. They all symbolised the unity of Romanians from all parts of the country and their Latinity. The monument was brought to Cluj by a delegation of 200 Italians, mostly students. It is a faithful copy of the Capitoline Wolf, with Romulus and Remus beneath her. To it was added a bas-relief of Emperor Trajan, executed by sculptor Ettore Ferrari, along with the inscription Alla citta di Cluj, Roma Madre, MCMXXI ("To the City of Cluj, Mother Rome, 1921"). It was decided to place the monument in Unirii Square, in front of the Statue of Matthias Corvinus. The first Romanian mayor of Cluj, Iulian Pop, unveiled the monument on 28 September 1921 in the presence of over 25,000 residents.

After the Second Vienna Award in 1940, a significant part of Cluj's Romanian population was forced to leave the city; the statue too was taken away to safety. After World War II, the statue was brought back to Cluj, but the prevailing political climate did not permit the statue to be put back in its original location, so it was placed in front of the University, where it remained until 1973, when the statue was again placed in Unirii Square. A group of statues of members of the Transylvanian School was set up in its place in front of the university.

In 1994 the statue was removed from its location at the intersection of Eroilor Boulevard and Unirii Square and replaced with the Memorandum Signers' Monument, erected in honour of the men who signed the Transylvanian Memorandum and had the strength to stand up to the magyarization measures against Romanians being undertaken by the Austro-Hungarian regime. The dedication of the monument took place exactly 100 years after the memorandum signers were sent to prison. The Statue of the She-Wolf was moved to the Transylvanian History Museum, where it was restored by the sculptor Liviu Mocan, later being placed in the middle of Eroilor Boulevard.

== See also ==
- Capitoline Wolf, Chișinău
