= Capitoline Wolf, Chișinău =

Monument in Central Chișinău, Moldova

Coordinates: 47°01′22.53″N 28°49′42.75″E

Capitoline Wolf
- Lupoaica Capitolină
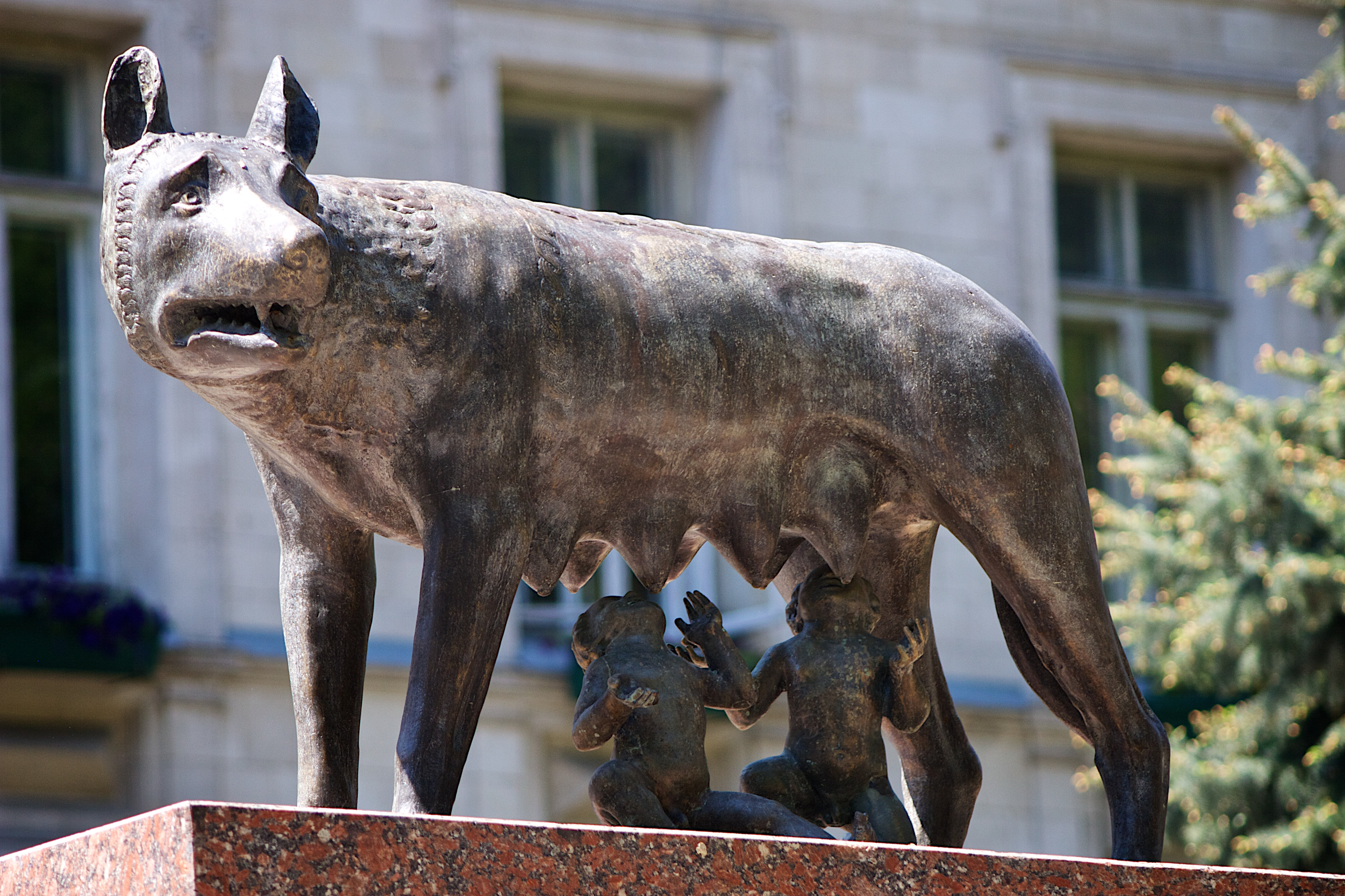
- Current statue
- Interactive map of Capitoline Wolf
- Location: Central Chișinău
- Designer: Alexandru Plămădeală
- Material: bronze, stone
- Length: 1.14 metres (3.7 ft) (bronze)
- Height: 0.75 metres (2.5 ft) (without the pedestal)
- Beginning date: 1921
- Completion date: 1923
- Opening date: September 20, 1926
- Dedicated to: Union of Bessarabia with Romania

The Capitoline Wolf (Romanian: Lupoaica Capitolină) is a monument in Central Chișinău, Moldova. It is located in front of the National History Museum of Moldova.

== Overview ==
During the first decades of the 20th century, Kingdom of Italy donated to Kingdom of Romania five copies of the Capitoline Wolf, which were installed in Chişinău (1921), Bucharest (1906), Cluj-Napoca (1921), Târgu Mureş (1924) and Timișoara (1926). In Chişinău, the monument was completed in 1923 and placed in front of Sfatul Țării Palace. In 1940, at the beginning of the Soviet occupation of Bessarabia and Northern Bukovina, the copy from Chişinău was destroyed.

In 1990, Romania donated a new copy of Capitoline Wolf to Moldova. This statue was unveiled in front of the National History Museum of Moldova on December 1, 1990.

== Restoration 2005–2009 ==
Soon after the 2005 election, the bronze statue was removed from its pedestal for restoration in April 2005. The monument was stored in the basement of the National History Museum and the restoration depended on the political context. The monument was re-unveiled just on December 1, 2009, a few months after July 2009 election, when the Alliance For European Integration pushed the Party of Communists into opposition.

== Gallery ==
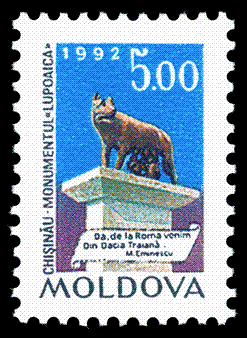
1992 stamp featuring the statue

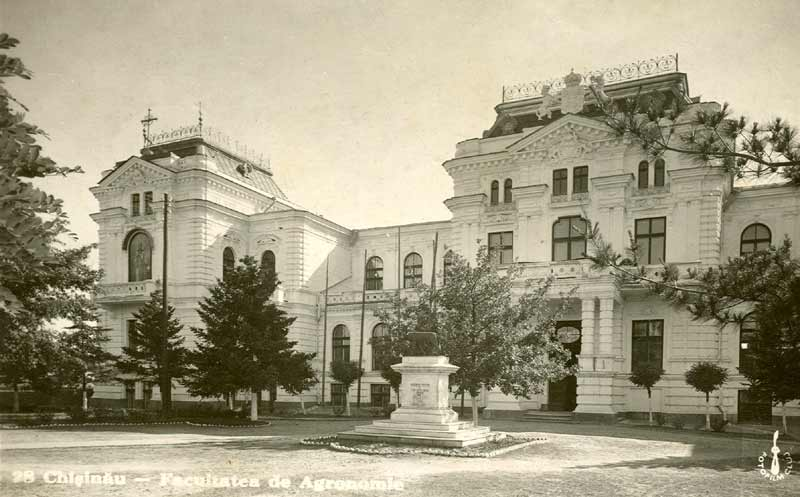
In front of Sfatul Țării Palace

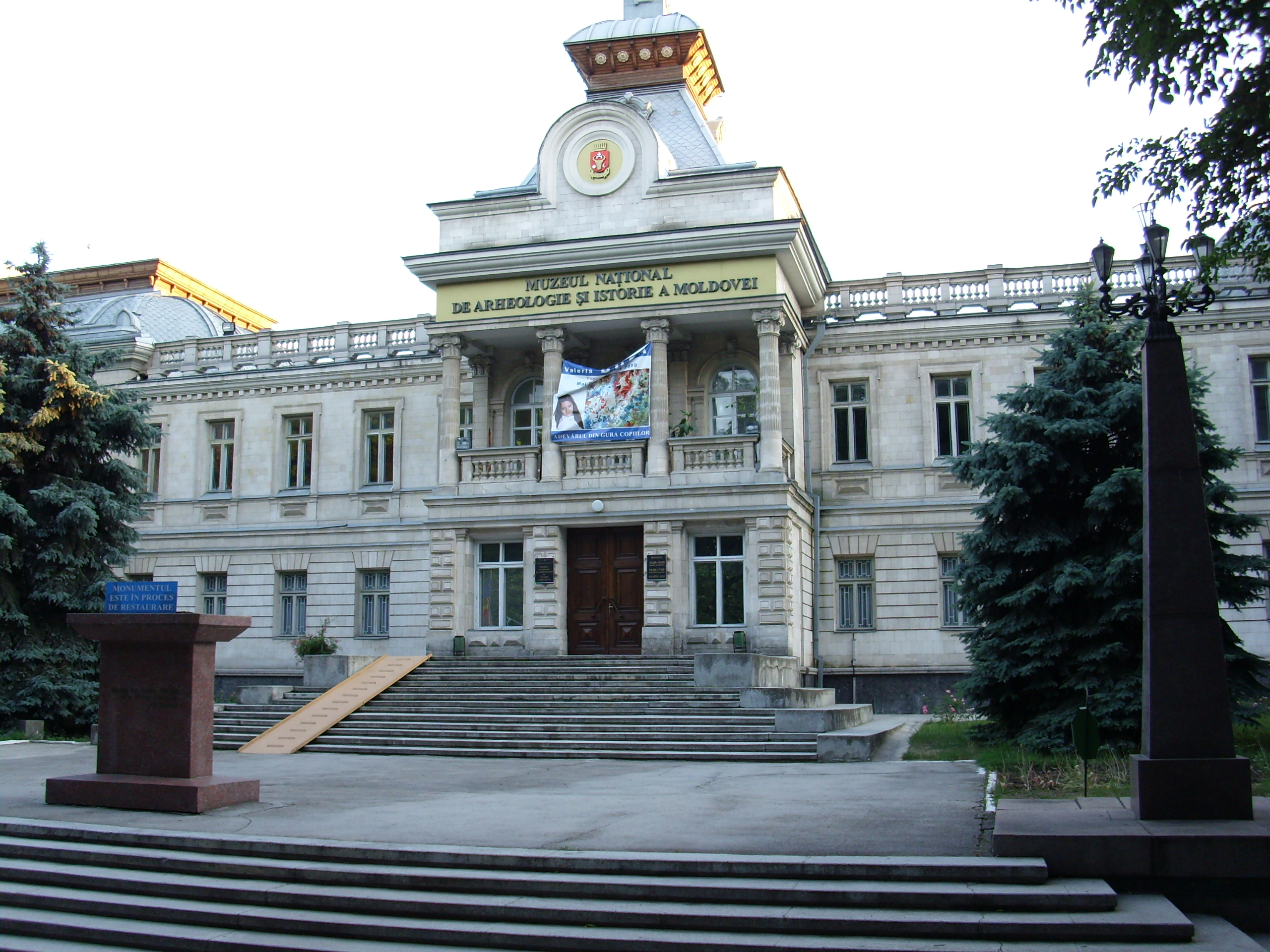
Under restoration 2005-2009

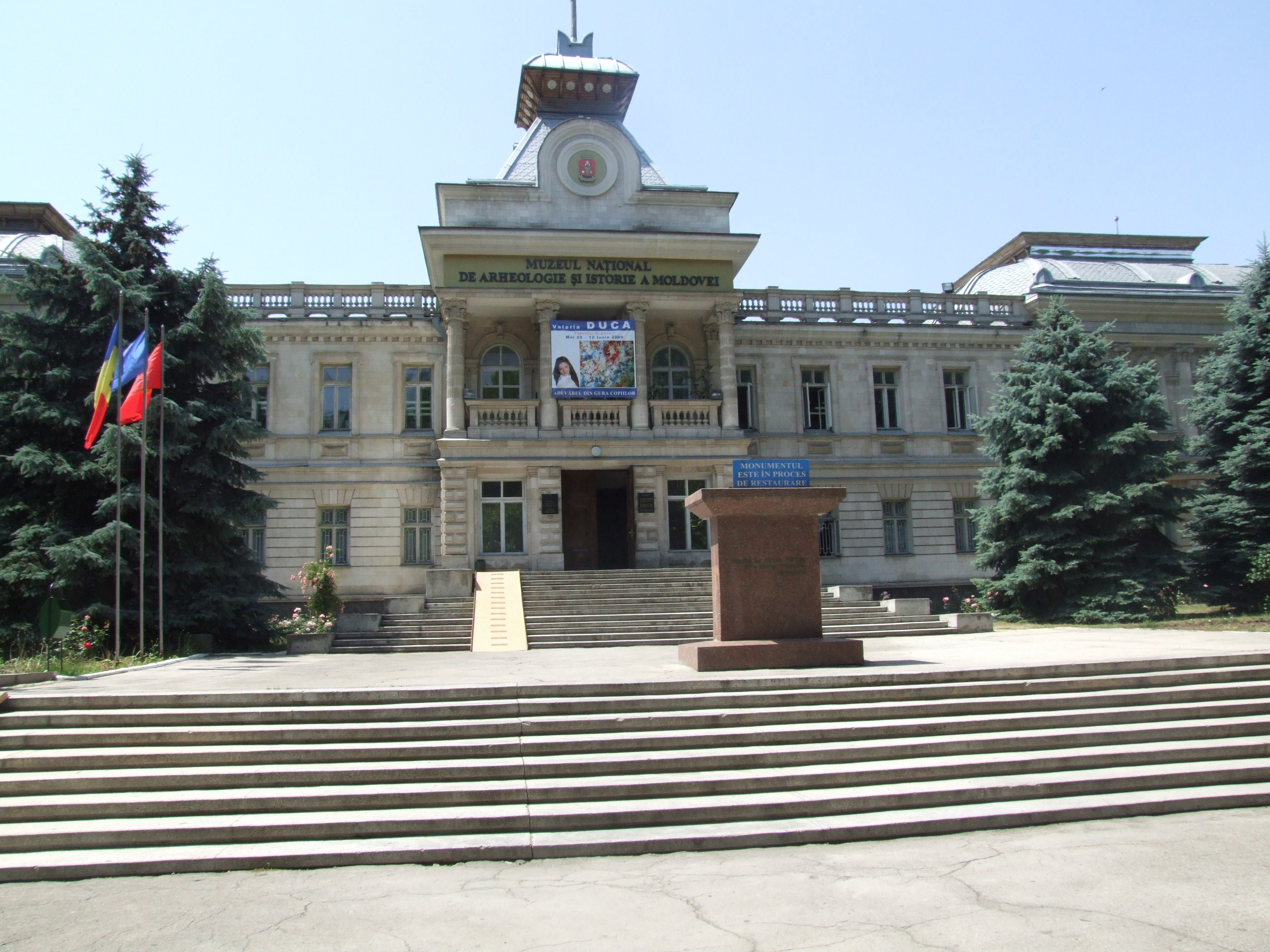
Under restoration in front of the History Museum

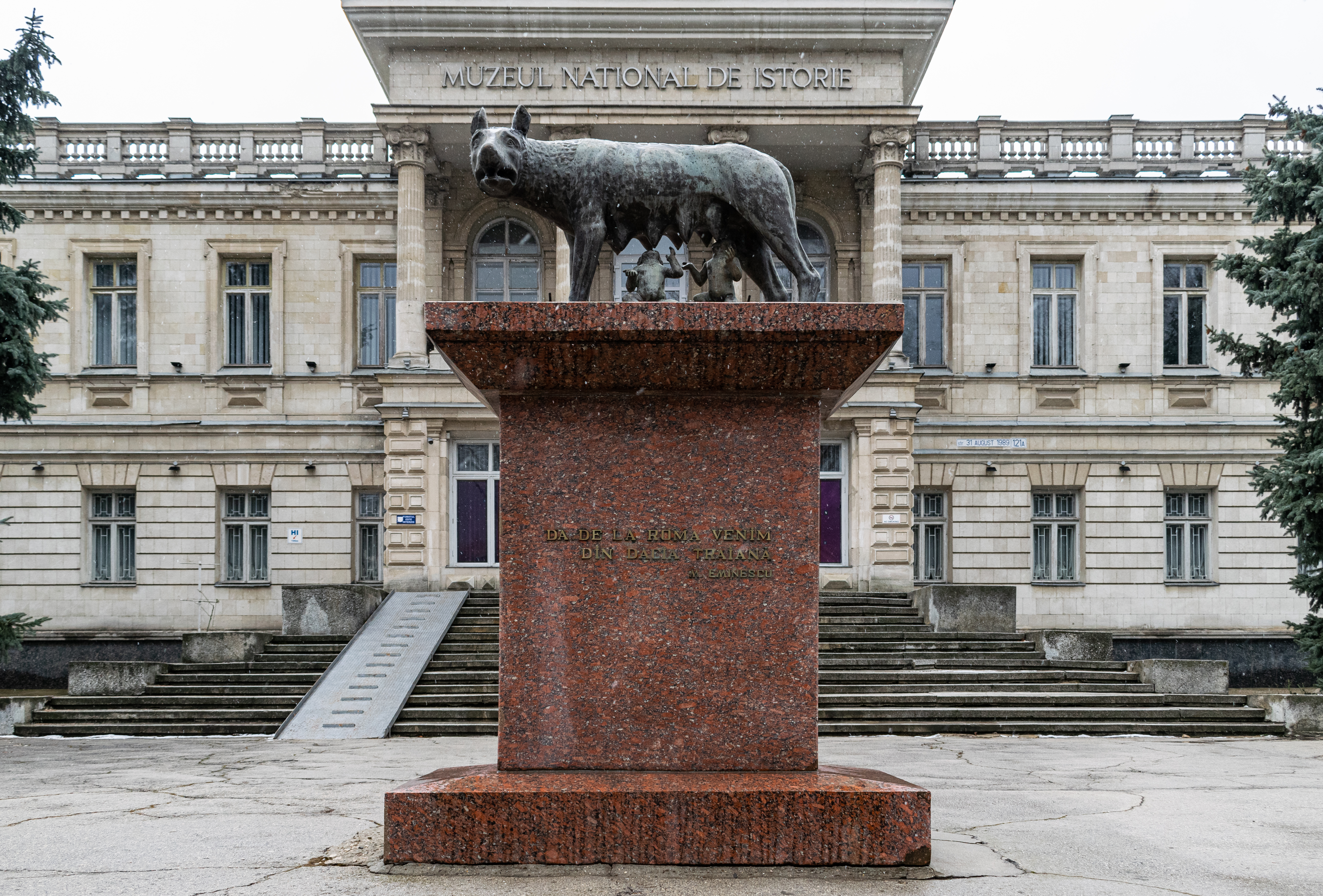
In front of the museum

== See also ==
- Capitoline Wolf statues in cities
