= Tiberinus =

Tiberinus may refer to:

- Tiberinus (god), deity of the River Tiber
- Tiberinus Silvius, the ninth king of Alba Longa
