= Capitoline Wolf =

Bronze sculpture of Rome's founding legend

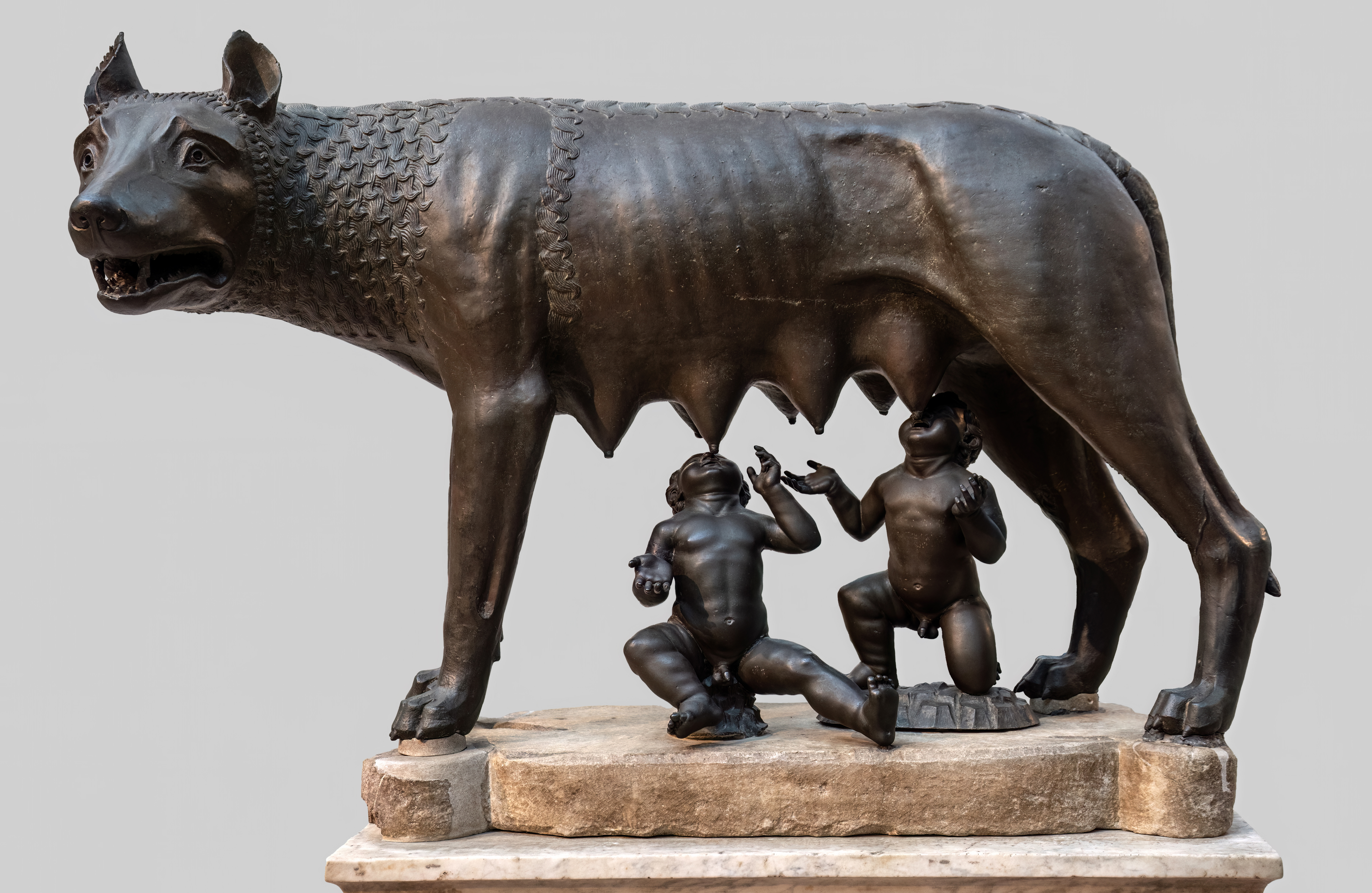
- Artists: Unknown (wolf); Antonio del Pollaiuolo (twins)
- Year: Etruscan, 5th century BC or 11th–12th centuries AD (wolf); Late 15th century AD (twins)
- Type: Bronze
- Dimensions: 75 cm × 114 cm (30 in × 45 in)
- Location: Capitoline Museums, Rome, Italy

The Capitoline Wolf (Latin: Lupa Capitolina) is a bronze sculpture depicting a scene from the legend of the founding of Rome. The sculpture shows a she-wolf suckling the mythical twin founders of Rome, Romulus and Remus. According to the legend, when King Numitor, grandfather of the twins, was overthrown by his brother Amulius in Alba Longa, the usurper ordered them to be cast into the Tiber River. They were rescued by a she-wolf that cared for them until a herdsman, Faustulus, found and raised them.

The age and origin of the Capitoline Wolf are controversial. The statue was long thought to be an Etruscan work of the fifth century BC, with the twins added in the late 15th century AD, probably by sculptor Antonio del Pollaiuolo. In a conference on the theme held in Rome on 28 February 2008, most academics continued to support an ancient Etruscan origin. However, radiocarbon and thermoluminescence dating in the 21st century indicates that the wolf portion of the statue may have been cast between 1021 and 1153. A 2025 lead isotope analysis of the bronze suggests that its metallic composition is consistent with copper obtained from various mines in the Holy Roman Empire. These results, however, have been contested, and there is yet no consensus for a revised dating.

The image of the she-wolf suckling Romulus and Remus has been a symbol of Rome since ancient times, and one of the most recognizable icons of ancient mythology. The sculpture has been housed since 1471 in the Palazzo dei Conservatori on the Campidoglio (the ancient Capitoline Hill), Rome, Italy, and many replicas are in various places around the world.

== Description ==
The sculpture is somewhat larger than life-size, standing 75 cm (30 in) high and 114 cm (45 in) long. The wolf is depicted in a tense, watchful pose, with alert ears and glaring eyes, which are watching for danger. By contrast, the human twins – executed in a completely different style – are oblivious to their surroundings, absorbed by their suckling.

== Attribution and dating ==
The she-wolf from the legend of Romulus and Remus was regarded as a symbol of Rome from ancient times. Several ancient sources refer to statues depicting the wolf suckling the twins. Livy reports in his Roman history that a statue was erected at the foot of the Palatine Hill in 295 BC. Pliny the Elder mentions the presence in the Roman Forum of a statue of a she-wolf that was "a miracle proclaimed in bronze nearby, as though she had crossed the Comitium while Attus Navius was taking the omens". Cicero also mentions a statue of the she-wolf as one of a number of sacred objects on the Capitoline that had been inauspiciously struck by lightning in 65 BC: "it was a gilt statue on the Capitol of a baby being given suck from the udders of a wolf." Cicero also mentions the wolf in De Divinatione 1.20 and 2.47.

The Capitoline Wolf was widely assumed to be the very sculpture described by Cicero, due to the presence of damage to the sculpture's paw, which was believed to correspond to the lightning strike of 65 BC. The 18th-century German art historian Johann Joachim Winckelmann attributed the statue to an Etruscan maker in the fifth century BC, based on how the wolf's fur was depicted. It was first attributed to the Veiian artist Vulca, who decorated the Temple of Jupiter Capitolinus; later scholars attribute it to an unknown Etruscan artist of around 480 or 470 BC. Winckelmann correctly identified a Renaissance origin for the twins; they were probably added in 1471 AD or later.

During the 19th century, a number of researchers questioned Winckelmann's dating of the bronze. August Emil Braun, the secretary of the Archaeological Institute of Rome, proposed in 1854 that the damage to the wolf's paw had been caused by an error during casting. Wilhelm Fröhner, the conservator of the Louvre, stated in 1878 that the style of the statue was attributable to the Carolingian art period rather than the Etruscan, and in 1885, Wilhelm von Bode also stated that he was of the view that the statue was most likely a medieval work. These views were largely disregarded, though, and had been forgotten by the 20th century.

In 2006, Italian art historian Anna Maria Carruba and archaeologist Adriano La Regina contested the traditional dating of the wolf on the basis of an analysis of the casting technique. Carruba had been given the task of restoring the sculpture in 1997, enabling her to examine how it had been made. She observed that the statue had been cast in a single piece, using a variation of the lost-wax casting technique. This technique was not used in Classical antiquity; ancient Greek and Roman bronzes were typically constructed from multiple pieces, a method that facilitated high-quality castings, with less risk than would be involved in casting the entire sculpture at once. Single-piece casting was widely used in the Middle Ages to mould bronze items that needed a high level of rigidity, such as bells and cannons. Like Braun, Carruba argues that the damage to the wolf's paw resulted from an error in the moulding process. In addition, La Regina, former superintendent of Rome's archaeological heritage, argues that the sculpture's artistic style is more akin to Carolingian and Romanesque art than that of the ancient world.

Radiocarbon dating was carried out at the University of Salento in February 2007 to resolve the question. Organic residues in the casting cores recovered from the inner part of the statue were dated to a radiocarbon age of 963 ± 15 BP, indicating to 95% confidence that the statue was made between 1021 and 1153 AD. Thermoluminescence dating of the clay core in 2021 likewise constrained its creation to between the 8th and 14th centuries.

John Osborne at the British School at Rome concluded that the radiocarbon and thermoluminescence dates were totally inconsistent. At the time, evidence indicated that metal from which the wolf is made is of the Etruscan type, using copper from Sardinia, and that there is no sign of the adulteration common in medieval times. However, a 2025 lead isotope analysis of bronze from the wolf statue showed at least four different bronze mixtures were used in the casting of the statue, as pre-industrial techniques did not permit lost-wax casting of a large, complex metal statue in a single charge. The hind paws had the most distinct metal composition, probably indicating that they were cast separately and later welded to the rest of the piece. While prior analysis had suggested the Cala Bona mine in Sardinia as a source of the copper, which would indicate an Etruscan or Roman origin, the lead isotope ratios of its ore are distinct from all those used in the statue. The isotopic ratios of the bronzes used are instead similar to those of coins minted in Italy between the 8th and 11th centuries, as well as those from the Merovingian, Carolingian, and Ottonian kingdoms of France and Germany, consistent with ores from the Black Forest. This suggests an origin for the Capitoline Wolf's bronze in the "imperial metal monopoly", where a centralized administration regulated the production and distribution of bronze and copper throughout the Holy Roman Empire.

The revised dating has not been universally accepted and has been contested by several scholars, including Andrea Carandini and Lellia Cracco Ruggini.

== History of the sculpture ==
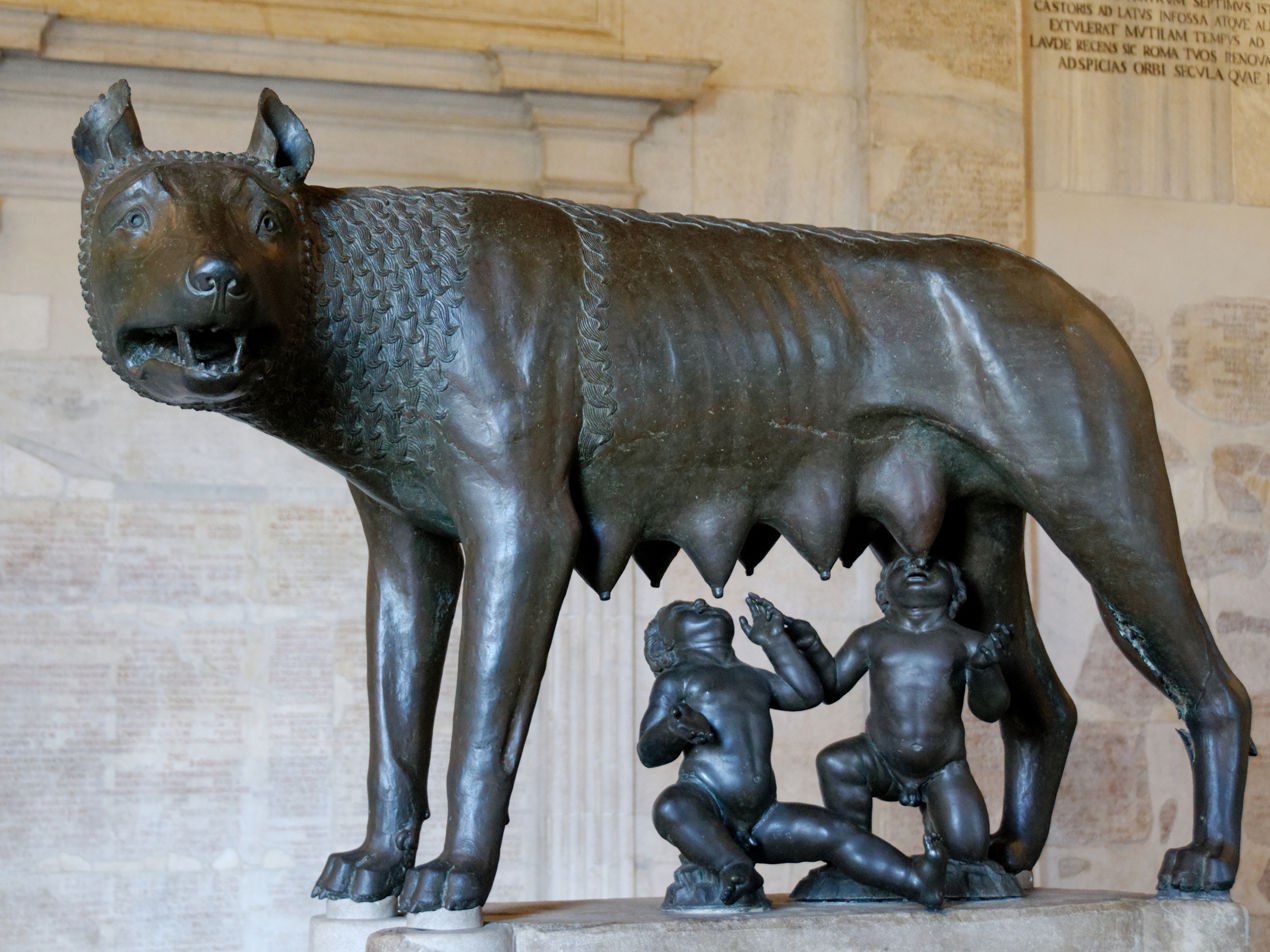
The sculpture in Musei Capitolini

When the sculpture was first erected is unclear, but a number of medieval references mention a "wolf" standing in the Pope's Lateran Palace. In the 10th-century Chronicon of Benedict of Soracte, the monk chronicler writes of the institution of a supreme court of justice "in the Lateran Palace, in the place called the Wolf, viz, the mother of the Romans." Trials and executions "at the Wolf" are recorded from time to time until 1438.

The 12th-century English cleric Magister Gregorius wrote a descriptive essay De Mirabilibus Urbis Romae and recorded in an appendix three pieces of sculpture he had neglected; one was the wolf in the portico, at the principal entrance to the Lateran Palace. He mentions no twins, for he noted that she was set up as if stalking a bronze ram that was nearby, which served as a fountain. The wolf had also served as a fountain, Magister Gregorius thought, but it had been broken off at the feet and moved to where he saw it.

The present-day Capitoline Wolf could not have been the sculpture seen by Benedict and Gregorius, if its newly attributed age is accepted, though it could have been a replacement for an earlier (now lost) depiction of the Roman wolf. In December 1471, Pope Sixtus IV ordered the present sculpture to be transferred to the Palazzo dei Conservatori on the Capitoline Hill, and the twins were added some time around then. The Capitoline Wolf joined a number of other genuinely ancient sculptures transferred at the same time, to form the nucleus of the Capitoline Museum.

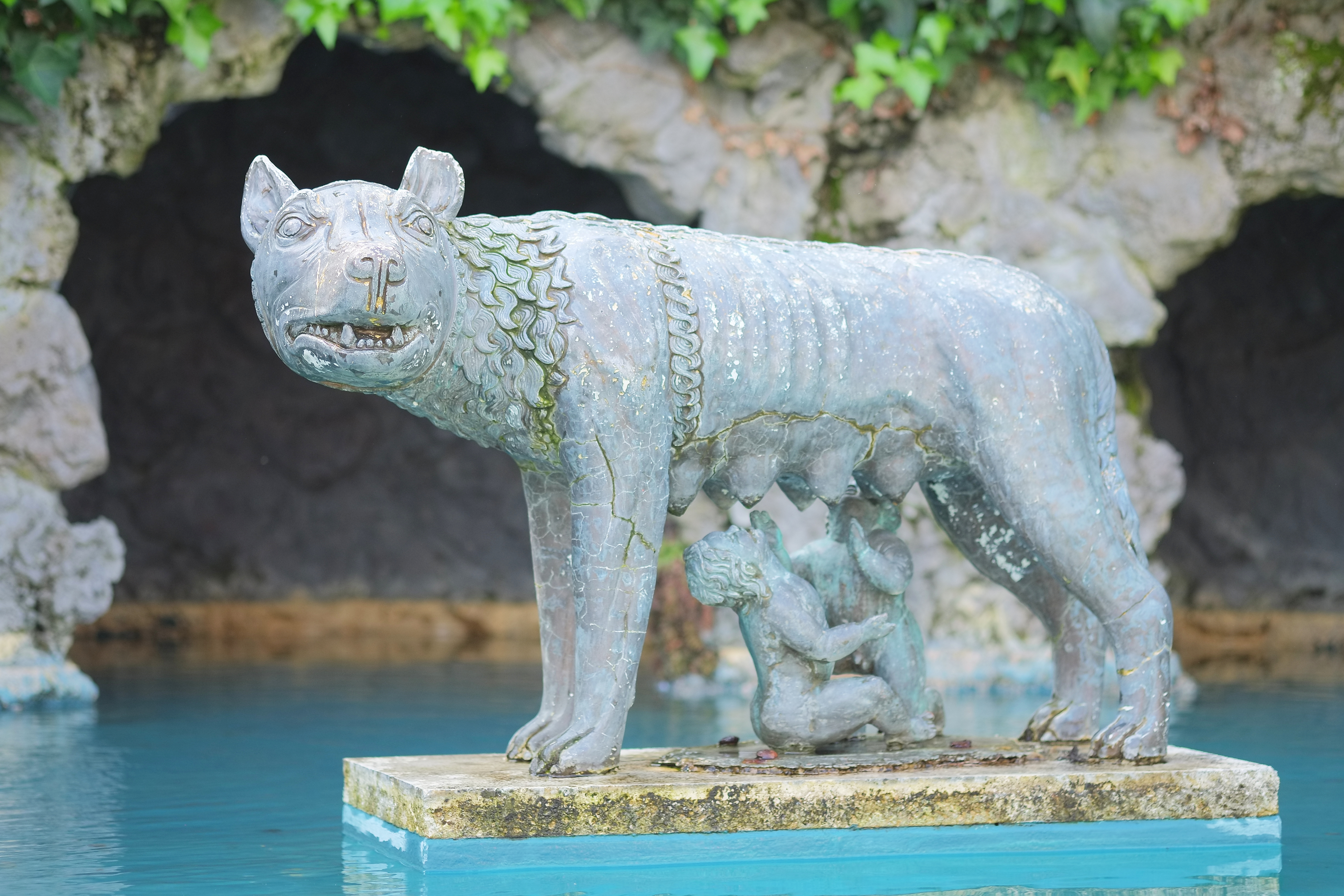
Capitoline Wolf in Hamilton Gardens, Hamilton, New Zealand

== Modern use and symbolism ==
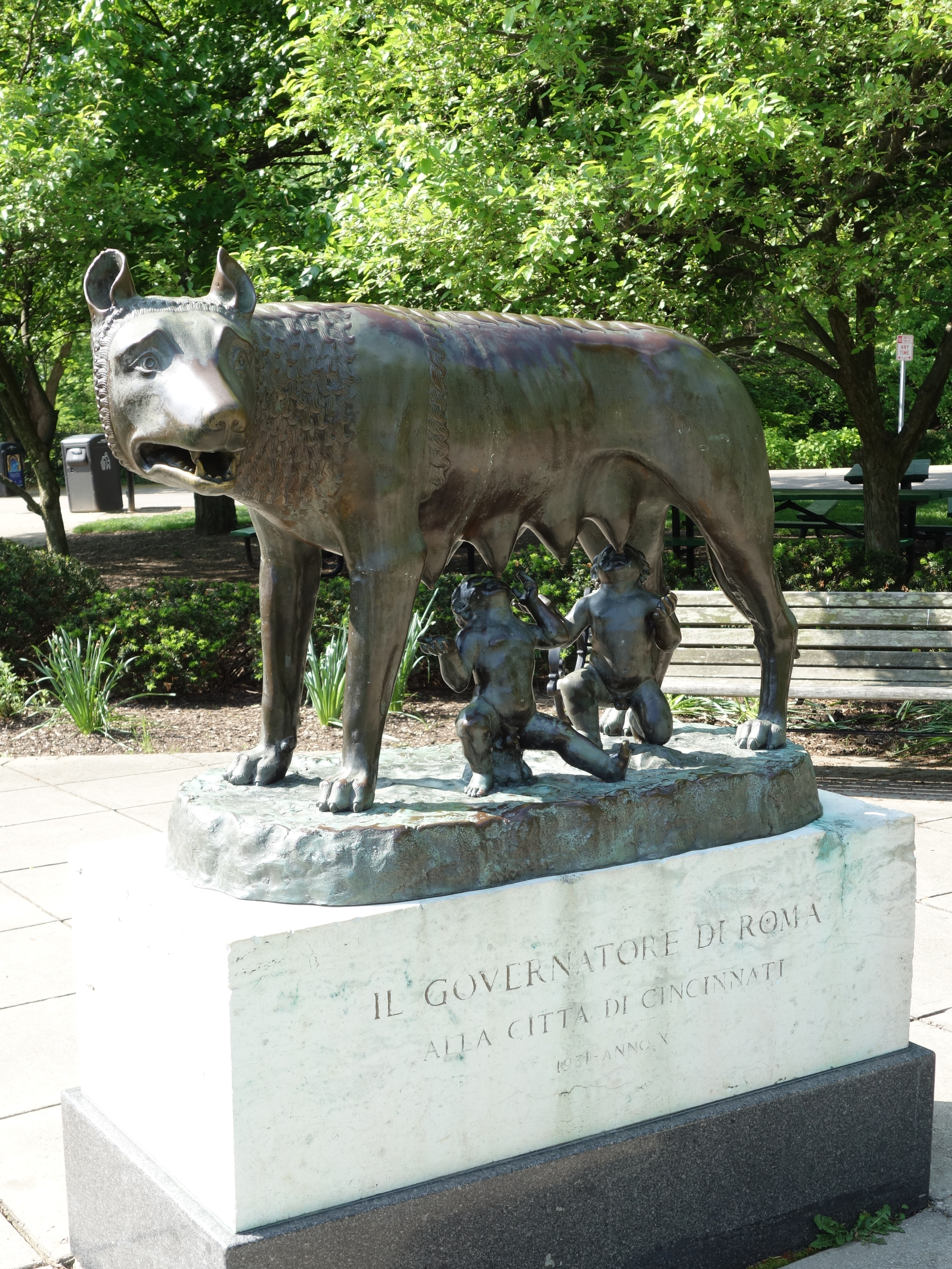
Capitoline she-wolf in Eden Park, Cincinnati, Ohio

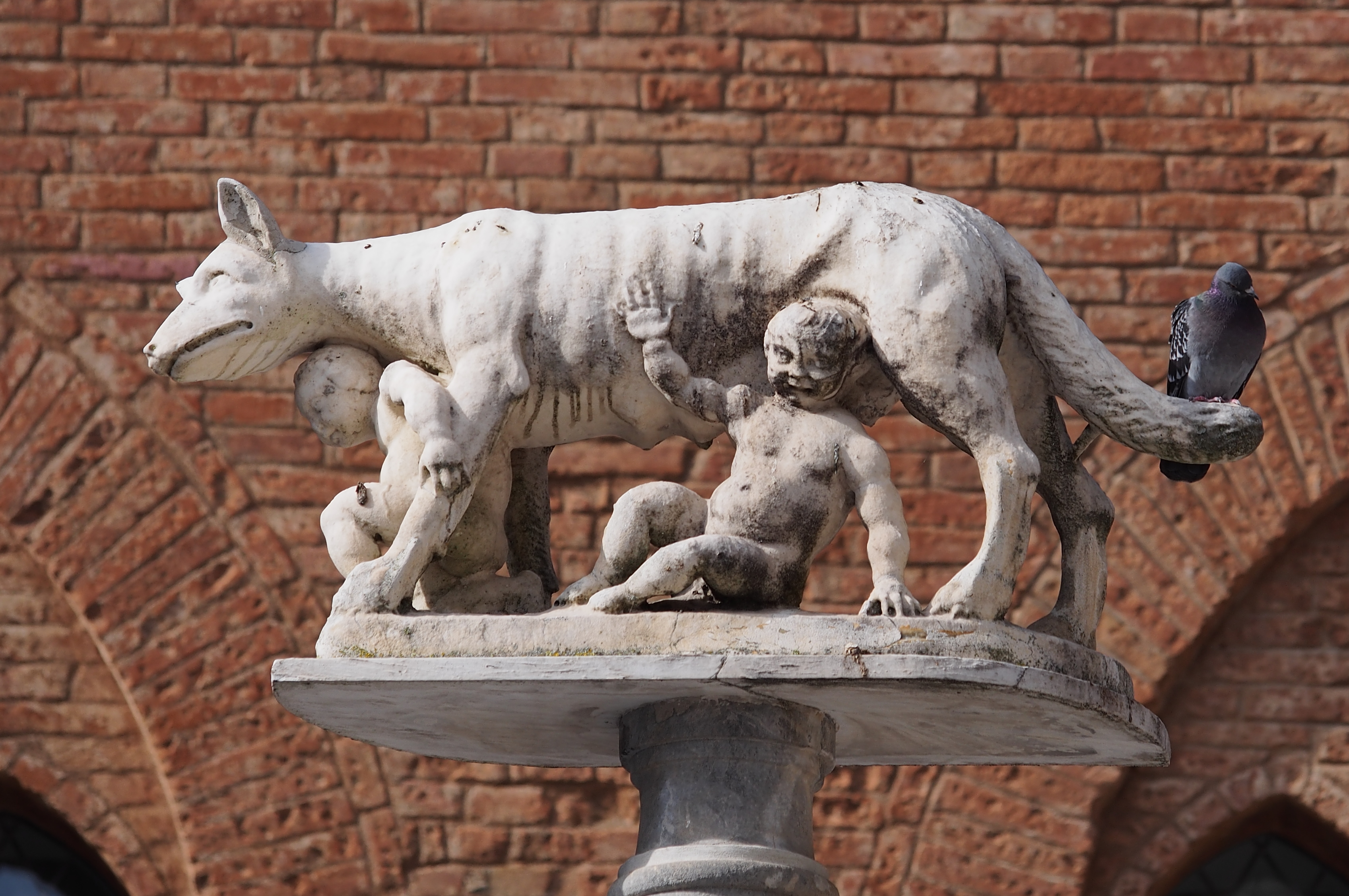
Capitoline Wolf at Siena Duomo. According to a legend Siena was founded by Senius and Aschius, two sons of Remus. When they fled Rome, they took the statue of the She-wolf to Siena, which became the symbol of the town.

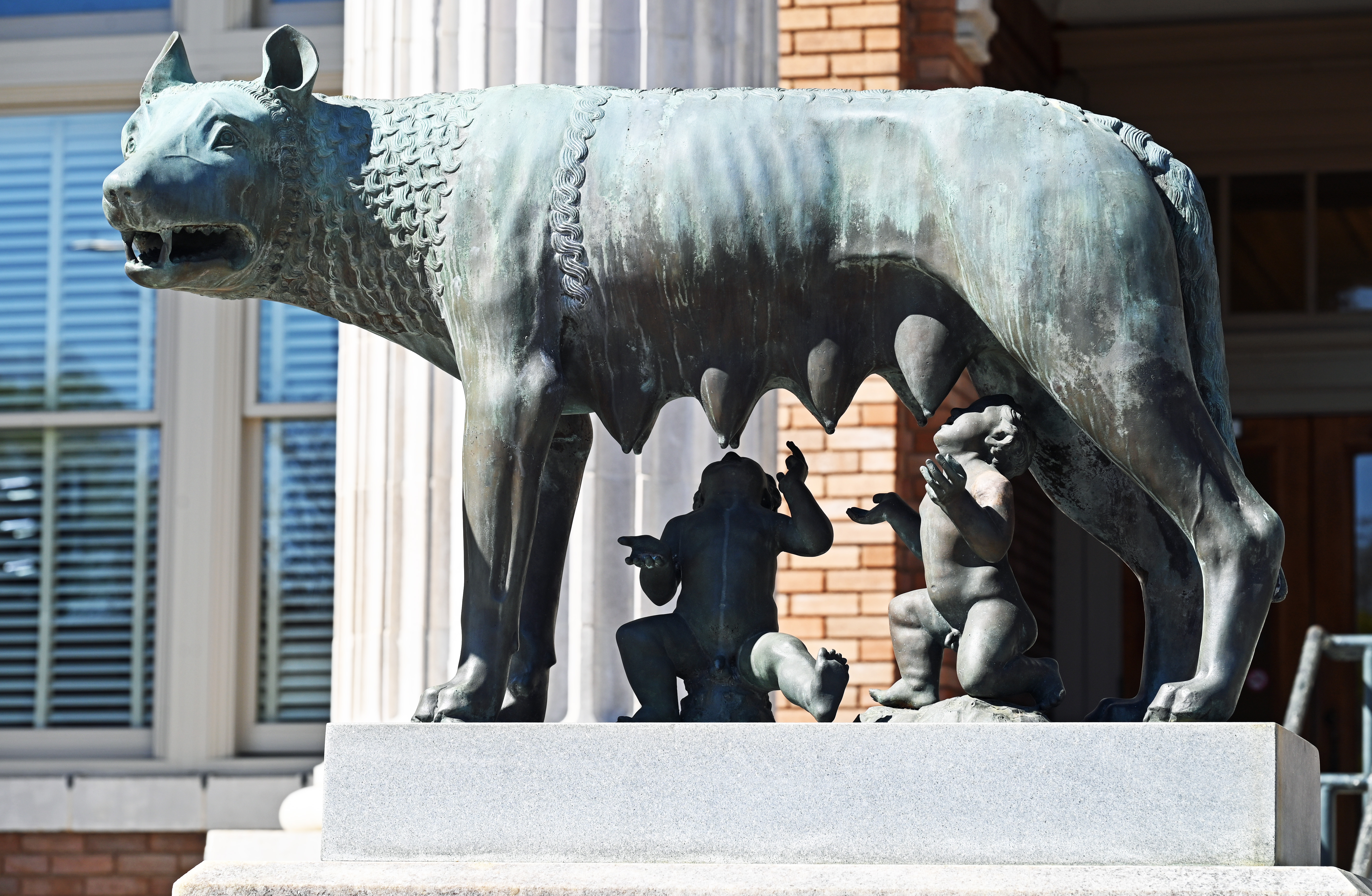
In Rome, Georgia, US

The governments of Italy and the mayors of Rome donated copies of the statue to various places around the world. Benito Mussolini continued this practice and especially favoured the image. To encourage American goodwill, he sent several copies of the Capitoline Wolf to U.S. cities. In 1929, he sent one replica for a Sons of Italy national convention in Cincinnati, Ohio. It was switched for another one in 1931, which still stands in Eden Park, Cincinnati. Another replica was given to the city of Rome, Georgia, the same year. A third copy went to Rome, New York in 1956 by Alfonso Felici, a veteran of World War II. Another ended up at North-Eastern Normal University, China, where ancient Greek and Roman history is studied.

The Capitoline Wolf was used on both the emblem and the poster for the 1960 Summer Olympics in Rome. The Roman football club A.S. Roma uses it in its emblem as well.

It was used as the logo for Artie Ripp's record label Family Productions, which in 1971 released Billy Joel's first album as a solo artist, Cold Spring Harbor. Due to contractual obligations, it continued to appear on numerous Joel albums even after he was subsequently signed to Columbia Records.

The programme of conservation undertaken in the 1990s resulted in an exhibition devoted to the Lupa Capitolina and her iconography.

Anthony Mann's 1964 epic film The Fall of the Roman Empire prominently features an enlarged replica prop of the Capitoline Wolf as a republican symbol at the back of the Senate House, where, historically, the altar and statue of Victory would have stood.

The 1976 TV series I, Claudius also features the statue in its depiction of the interior of the Senate House.

In the first episode of the American television programme The Addams Family, a mirror-image sculpture of the Capitoline Wolf is on display in the Addams's living room.

The Boston Latin School uses an image on the cover of their agenda book, which is the official school emblem.

The Capitoline Wolf is reimagined in Look at Me (new Capitoline Wolf), a 2011 installation by Polish artist Paweł Wocial.

In the Nintendo game Animal Crossing: New Horizons, the Capitoline Wolf is a statue that can be obtained, albeit under the pseudonym of "Motherly statue".

== See also ==
- Capitoline Wolf statues in cities
