= Tiberinus (god) =

Roman water deity

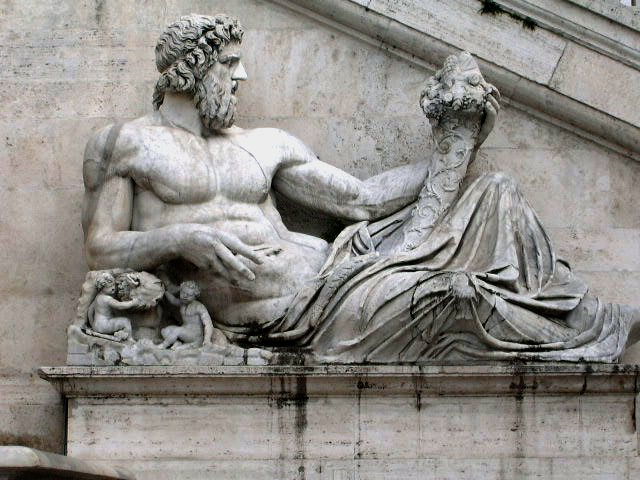
Tiberinus (statue from the Campidoglio, Rome).

Tiberinus is a figure in Roman mythology. He was the god of the Tiber River. He was added to the 3,000 rivers (sons of Oceanus and Tethys), as the genius of the Tiber.

== Mythology ==
According to Book VIII of Virgil's epic Aeneid, Tiberinus helped Aeneas after his arrival in Italy from Troy, suggesting to him that he seek an alliance with Evander of Pallene in the war against Turnus and his allies (see founding of Rome). Tiberinus appeared to Aeneas in a dream, telling him he had arrived at his true home. Tiberinus also calmed the water so that Aeneas's boat was able to reach the city safely. With Manto, Tiberinus was the father of Ocnus.

According to Livy, author of Ab Urbe Condita, the first name of the river Tiber was Albula, and Tiberinus was one of the kings of Alba Longa, who drowned in crossing this river, and gave the river his name.

Tiberinus is also known as the river god who found the twins Romulus and Remus and gave them to the she-wolf Lupa (who had just lost her own cubs) to suckle. He later rescued and married Rhea Silvia, the mother of the twins and a Vestal Virgin who had been sentenced to death.

== Worship ==
Tiberinus was considered to be one of the most important river-gods and people made sure to put offerings in the Tiber River every May. Tiberinus was honored with twenty-seven straw dummies which were called Argei.

== Gallery ==
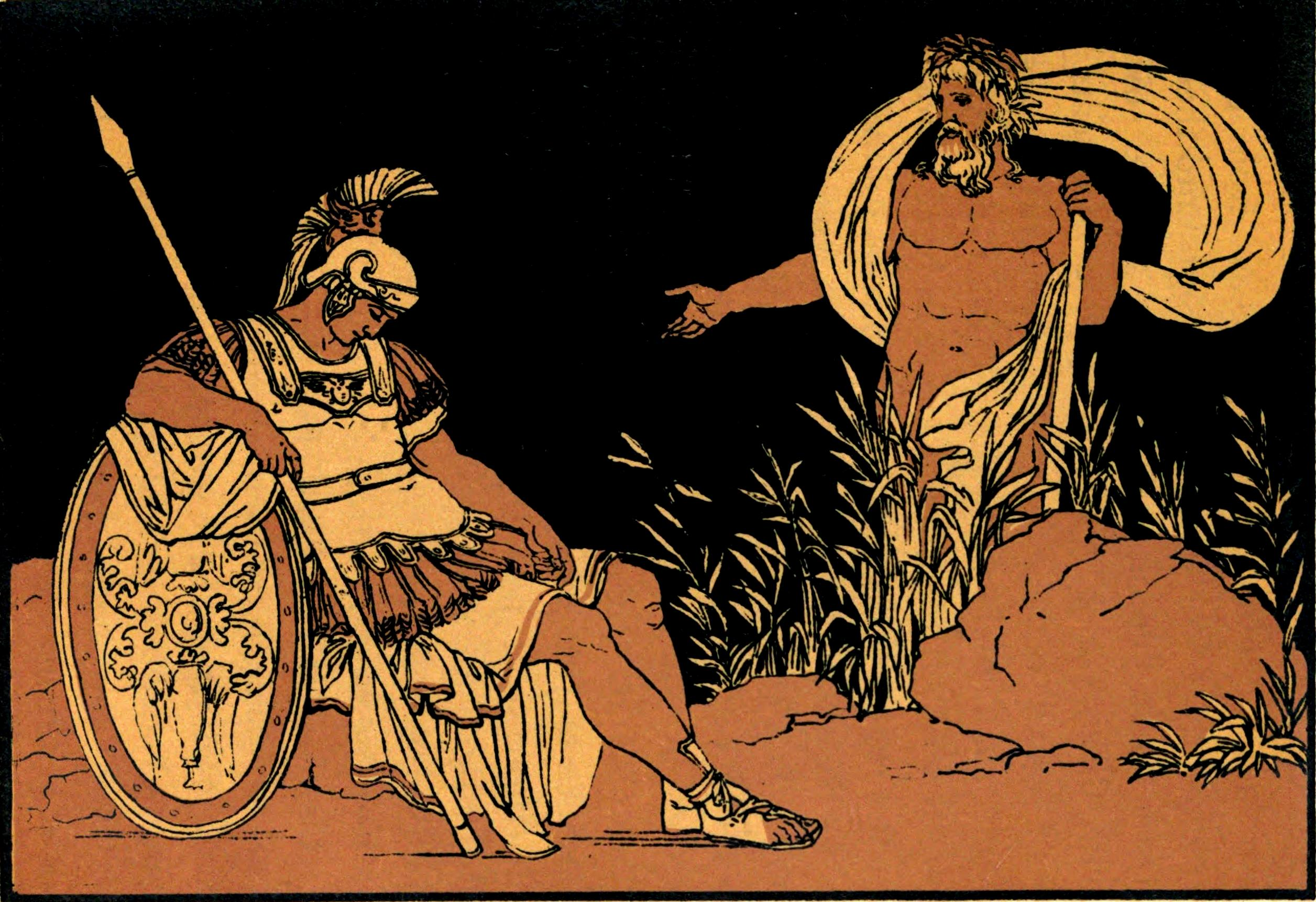
Aeneas and Tiberinus by Bartolomeo Pinelli

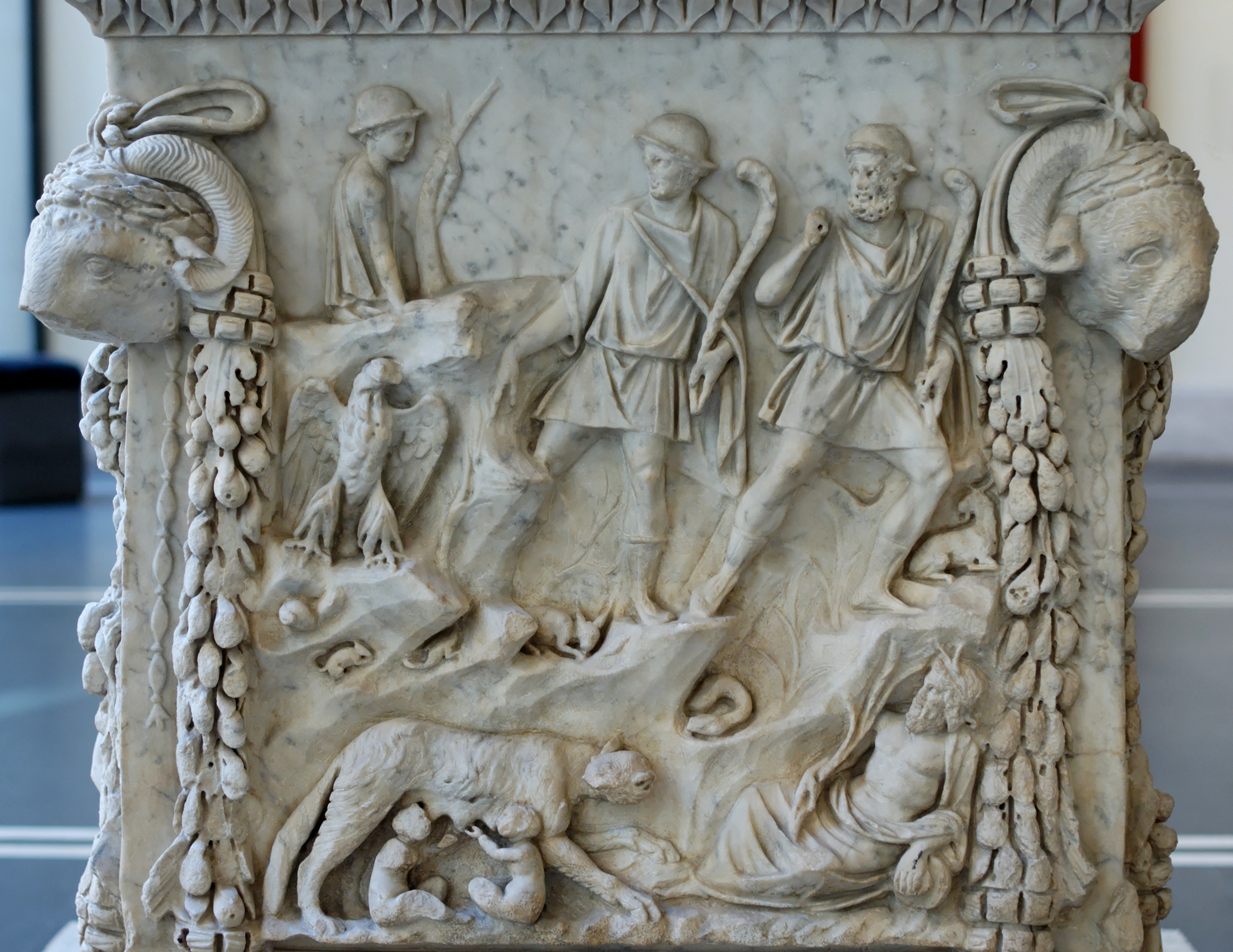
Altar, showing Tiberinus (bottom right) revealing the twins
