= Paweł Wocial =

- Born: Poland
- Education: University of Fine Arts in Poznań
- Known for: installation art, kinetic art
- Notable work: Spirit of Ecstasy (installation) Look at Me (new Capitoline Wolf)
- Website: http://www.pawelwocial.com

Paweł Wocial is a Polish installation and object artist, sculptor, designer and scenographer. He graduated from the Faculty of Sculpture at the Academy of Fine Arts in Poznań, Poland. In his artworks (installations, objects, kinetic sculptures, photography and drawings) he concentrates on relations between form, structure, perception and consciousness. His work refers to the concept of design thinking: human ability to create in the mind different kinds of simulations resulting in relationships and perception of reality.

== Career ==
Wocial's works have been presented among others at the Watou Art Festival (Kunstenfestival Watou) in Belgium; Paris Fashion Week in France; the 2015 Zoom Festival; WUK Projektraum in Vienna, Austria; and in the Center for Art and Media Karlsruhe in Germany. His works have been exhibited in UK, Turkey, Austria, Netherlands, Ireland, accompanied by works of famous artists including Banksy, Berlinde De Bruyckere, Marina Abramović, Tracey Emin, Erwin Wurm, Li Hui and Franz Ackermann. Wocial's works are in private collections in Austria, Germany, Poland and others.

His work Spirit of Ecstasy (a full-size Rolls-Royce car with a Spirit of Ecstasy emblem on the bonnet, made from thousands of cheap Chinese toys) was realized with the support of the Art Stations Foundation of Grażyna Kulczyk.

In 2009 he moved to London, where he broadened the field of his activities with the art of design. Wocial began his cooperation with Dr J Milo Taylor, who was interested particularly in sound, his main focus of research and creative actions, and with Austrian artists Andreas Harrer and Leo Riegler. At the same time Wocial's installation Look at Me inspired Maciej Zień; the work became Zień's main motif in a fashion collection under this title.

Wocial has been living and working in Warsaw since 2012.

== Works ==
=== Look at Me (new Capitoline Wolf) ===
Look at Me (new Capitoline Wolf) by Paweł Wocial at the Kunstenfestival Watou 2011, curator: Jan Moeyaert

Look at Me (new Capitoline Wolf) is a 2011 art installation by Paweł Wocial. The installation is 210 centimetres (6 ft 11 in) tall and made of acrylic, polyester, fabric, jewelry, hair, plastic bottles and rubber teats. The form of the work refers to the Capitoline Wolf sculpture.

The installation by was presented at Paris Fashion Week in France, the Watou Art Festival (Kunstenfestival Watou) in Belgium, and at Unit 24 Gallery in London, UK.

Look at Me (new Capitoline Wolf) was the inspiration for a collection by Polish fashion and interior designer Maciej Zień, who included Wocial’s work in the scenery of his fashion shows and reproduced images of the wolf on dresses and shirts.
