= Senius and Aschius =

Legendary founders of Siena

Senius and Aschius are the two legendary founders of Siena, Italy. They were brothers, sons of Remus, and thus Romulus was their uncle.

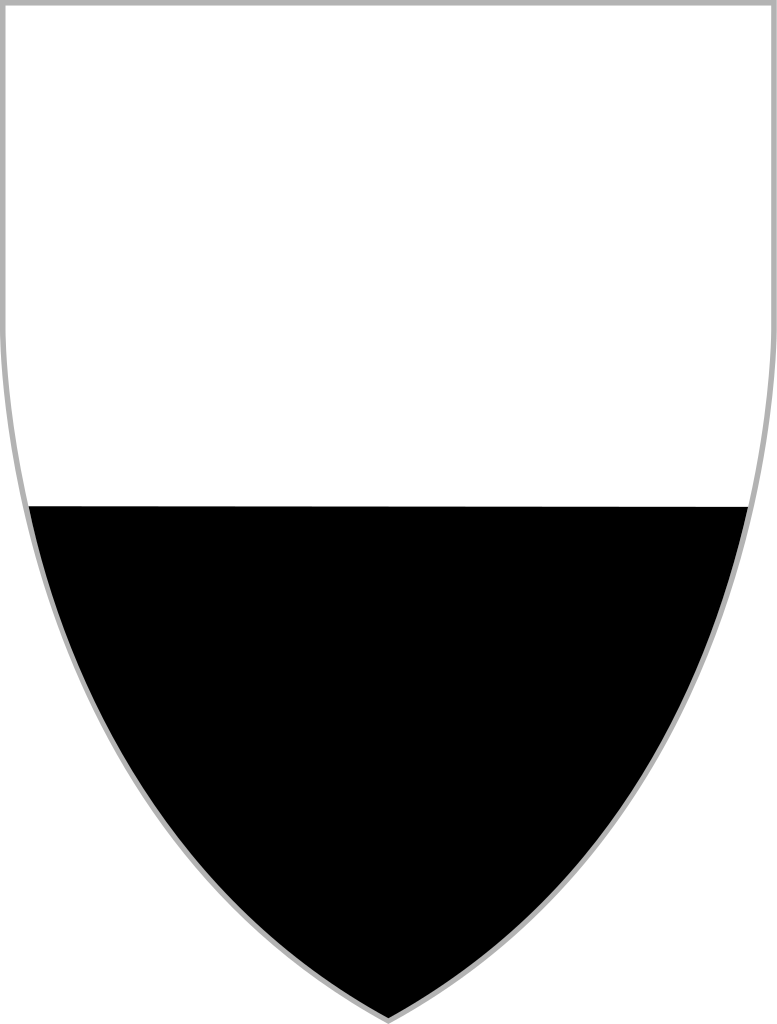
Sienese coat of arms

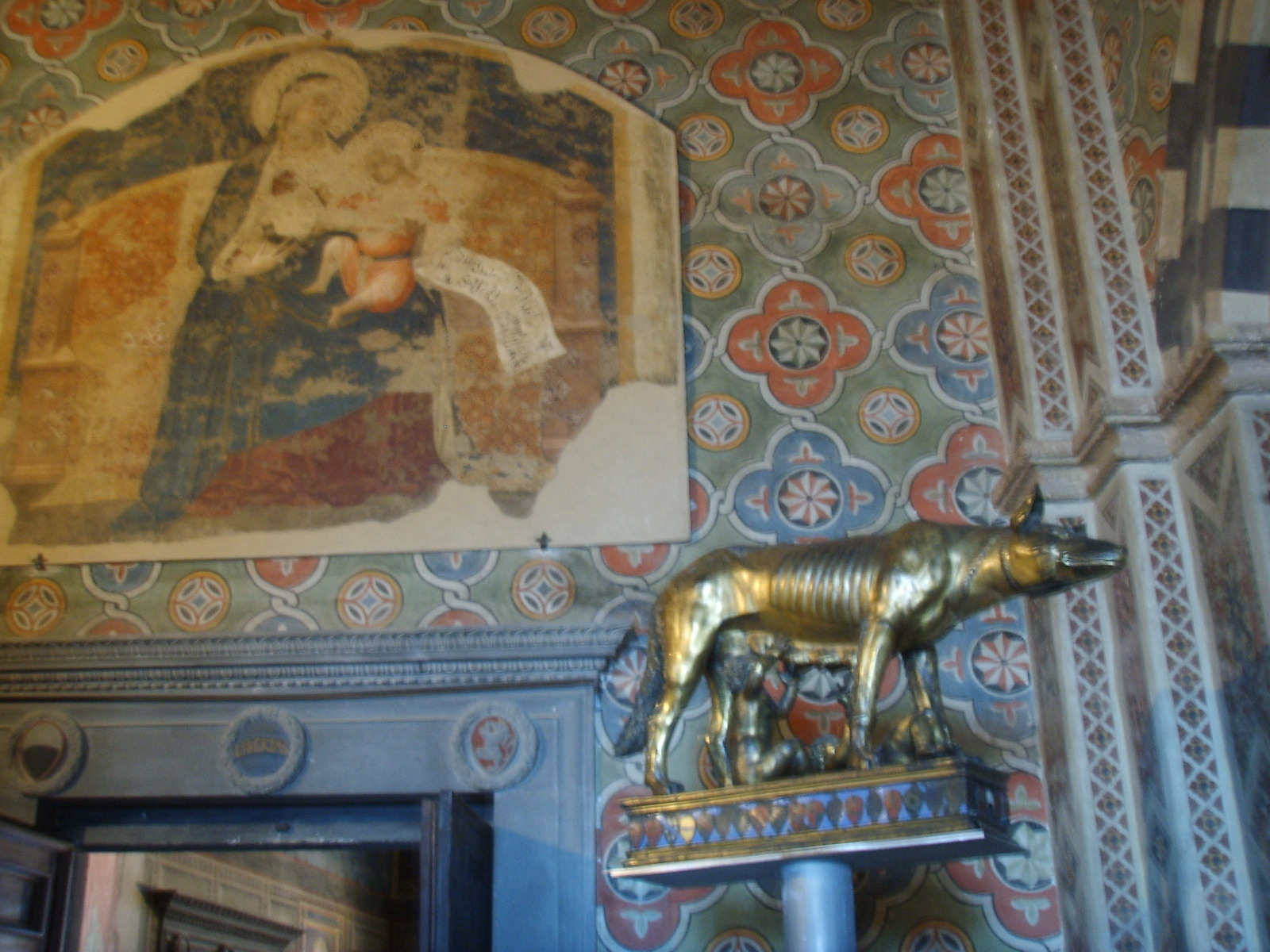
Lupa in Palazzo Pubblico, Siena

Traditions developed in Siena, which can not be documented prior to the 16th century hold that after Romulus murdered their father during the Foundation of Rome, Senius (who gave his name to the city) and his brother Aschius were forced to flee Rome on horseback, riding respectively on a black horse and a white one, giving rise to the colors on the Balzana, the coat of arms of Siena.

Some tellings of the legend hold that the brothers were protected by the Gods with a white cloud during the day and a dark cloud at night. They also claim the brothers stole the statue of the Capitoline Wolf from the Temple of Apollo in Rome. However, since the brothers were descendants of Remus, Siena did have a claim to be descendants of one of the siblings nurtured by the she-wolf (lupa), which serves as a symbol of Rome.

The Porta Camollia, in the Walls of Siena, is putatively named after an emissary or soldier sent to lure the brothers back to Rome, but who elected to stay instead.

One role of the legend is to grant the Sienese a noble and ancient ancestry; Rome itself had sought such a pedigree with the story of the Aeneid of Virgil. Many cities in the Italian peninsula seeking pre-eminence, such as Venice and Florence, also looked for a foundation story to link their city to greatness. It is possible that the black and white colors and history were meant to try to maintain a common bond even among the fractious Sienese, especially when torn by civil strife and factionalism between Guelphs and Ghibellines.
