= Romulus and Remus =

Twin brothers and central characters of Rome's foundation myth

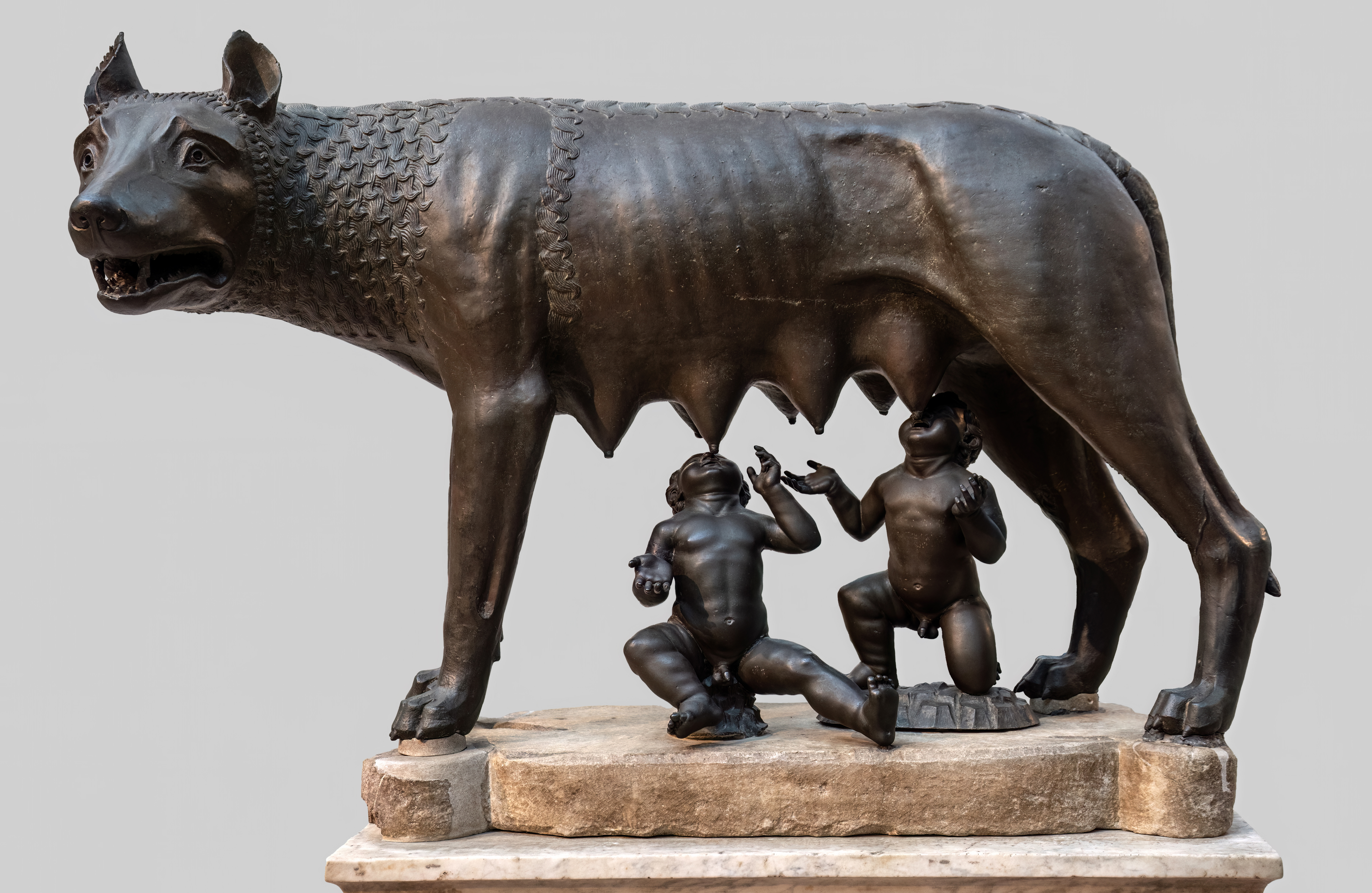
La Lupa Capitolina ("the Capitoline Wolf"). Traditional scholarship says the wolf-figure is Etruscan, 5th century BC. The figures of Romulus and Remus were added in the 15th century AD by Antonio del Pollaiuolo. Some modern research suggests that the she-wolf may be a Romanesque sculpture dating from the 13th century AD.

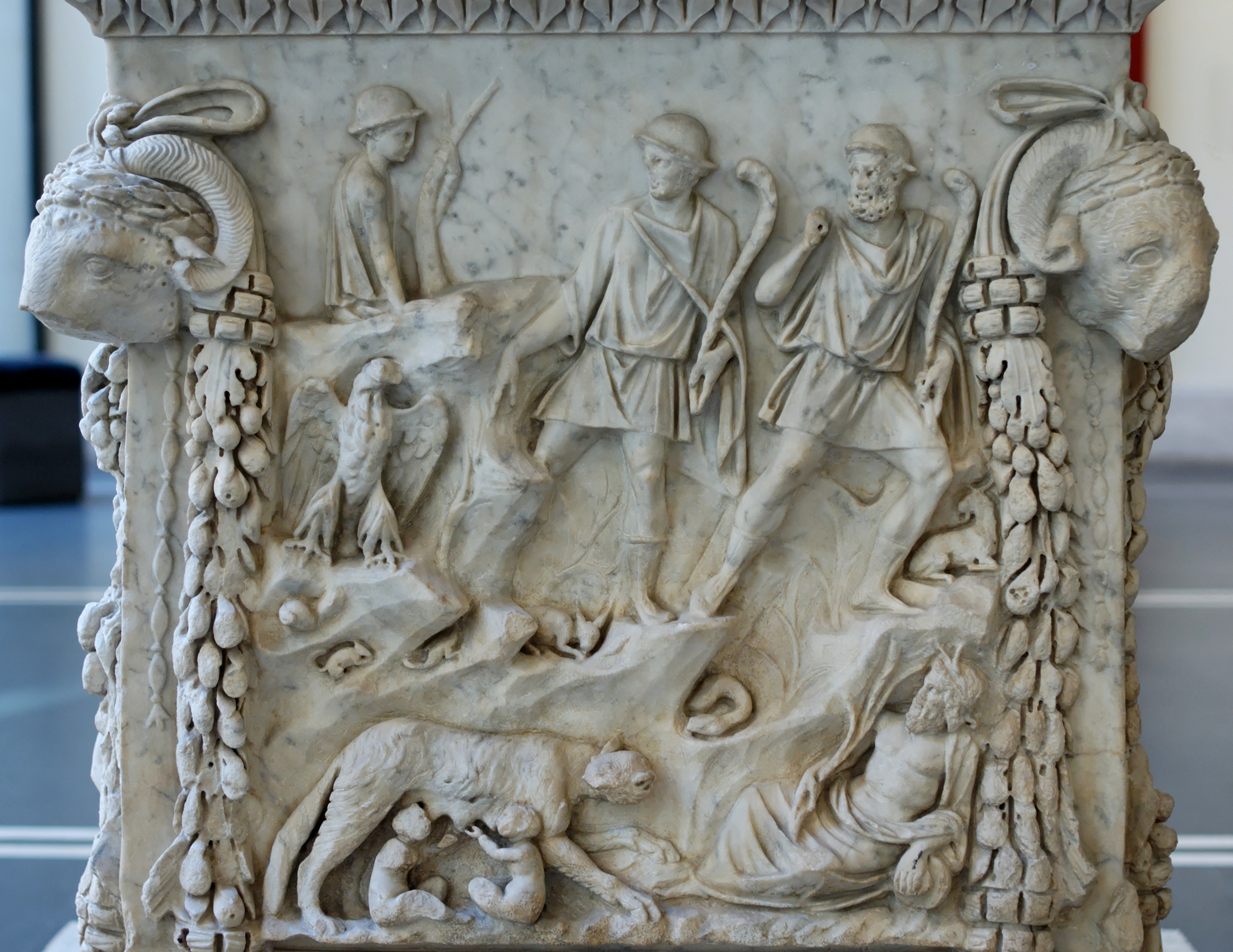
Altar to Mars (divine father of Romulus and Remus) and Venus (their divine ancestress) depicting elements of their legend. The god Tiberinus ("Father Tiber") and the infant twins being suckled by a she-wolf in the Lupercal are below. A vulture from the contest of augury and Palatine Hill are to the left. (From Ostia, now at the Palazzo Massimo alle Terme)

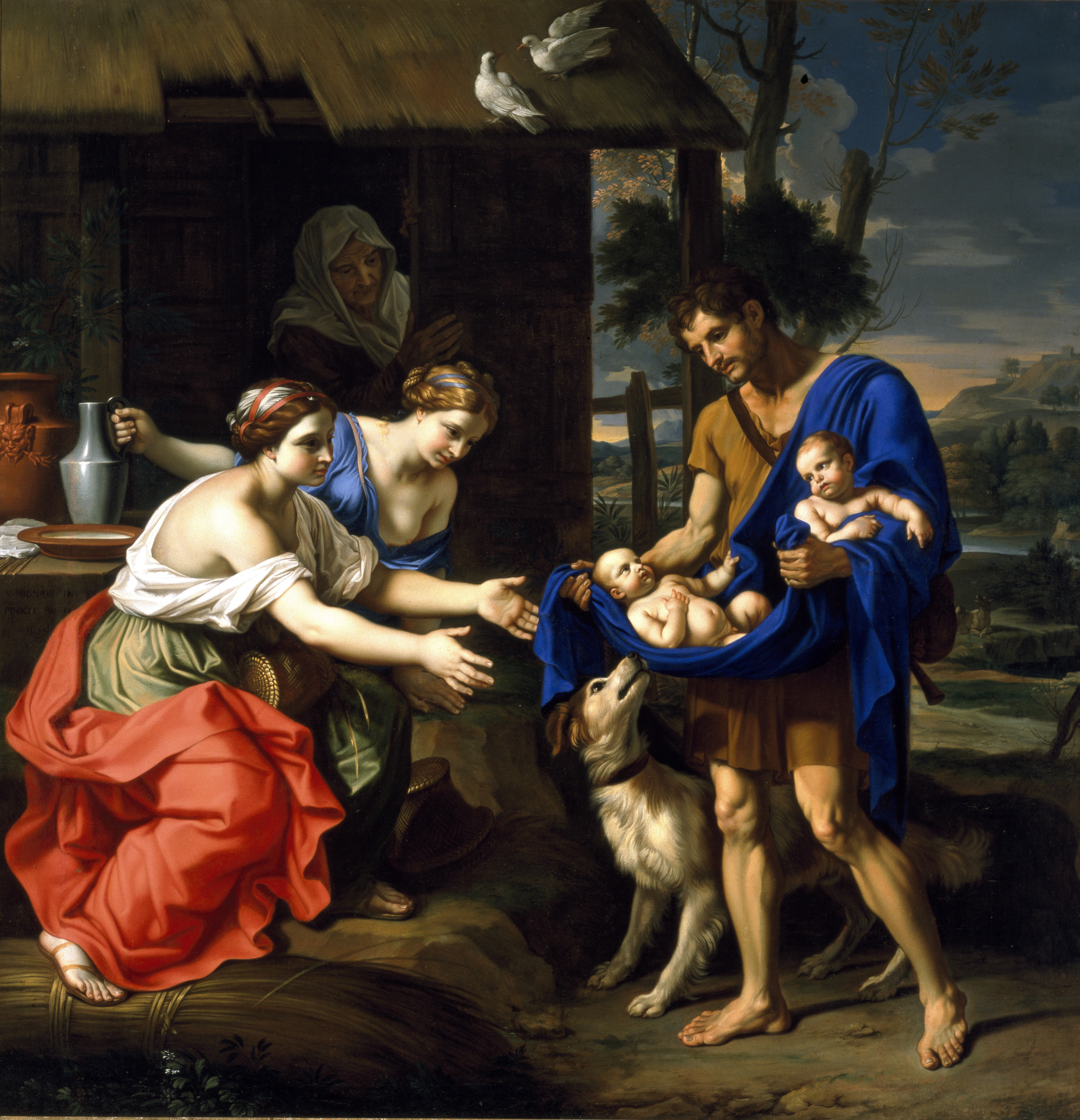
The Shepherd Faustulus Bringing Romulus and Remus to His Wife, Nicolas Mignard (1654)

In Roman mythology, Romulus and Remus (Latin: [ˈroːmʊlʊs], [ˈrɛmʊs]) are twin brothers whose story tells of the events that led to the founding of the city of Rome and the Roman Kingdom by Romulus, following his fratricide of Remus. The image of a she-wolf suckling the twins in their infancy has been a symbol of the city of Rome and the ancient Romans since at least the 3rd century BC. Although the tale takes place before the founding of Rome in 753 BC, the earliest known written account of the myth is from the late 3rd century BC. Possible historical bases for the story, and interpretations of its local variants, are subjects of ongoing debate.

== Overview ==
Romulus and Remus were born in Alba Longa, one of the many ancient Latin cities near the seven hills of Rome. Their mother Rhea Silvia, also known as Ilia, was a Vestal Virgin and the daughter of former king Numitor, who had been displaced by his brother Amulius. In some sources, Rhea Silvia conceived them when the god Mars visited her in a sacred grove dedicated to him.

Seeing them as a possible threat to his rule, King Amulius ordered them to be killed and they were abandoned on the bank of the river Tiber to die. They were saved by the god Tiberinus, Father of the River, and survived with the care of others at the site of future Rome. In the best-known episode, the twins were suckled by a she-wolf in a cave now known as the Lupercal. Eventually, they were adopted by Faustulus, a shepherd. They grew up tending flocks, unaware of their true identities. Over time, they became natural leaders and attracted a company of supporters from the community.

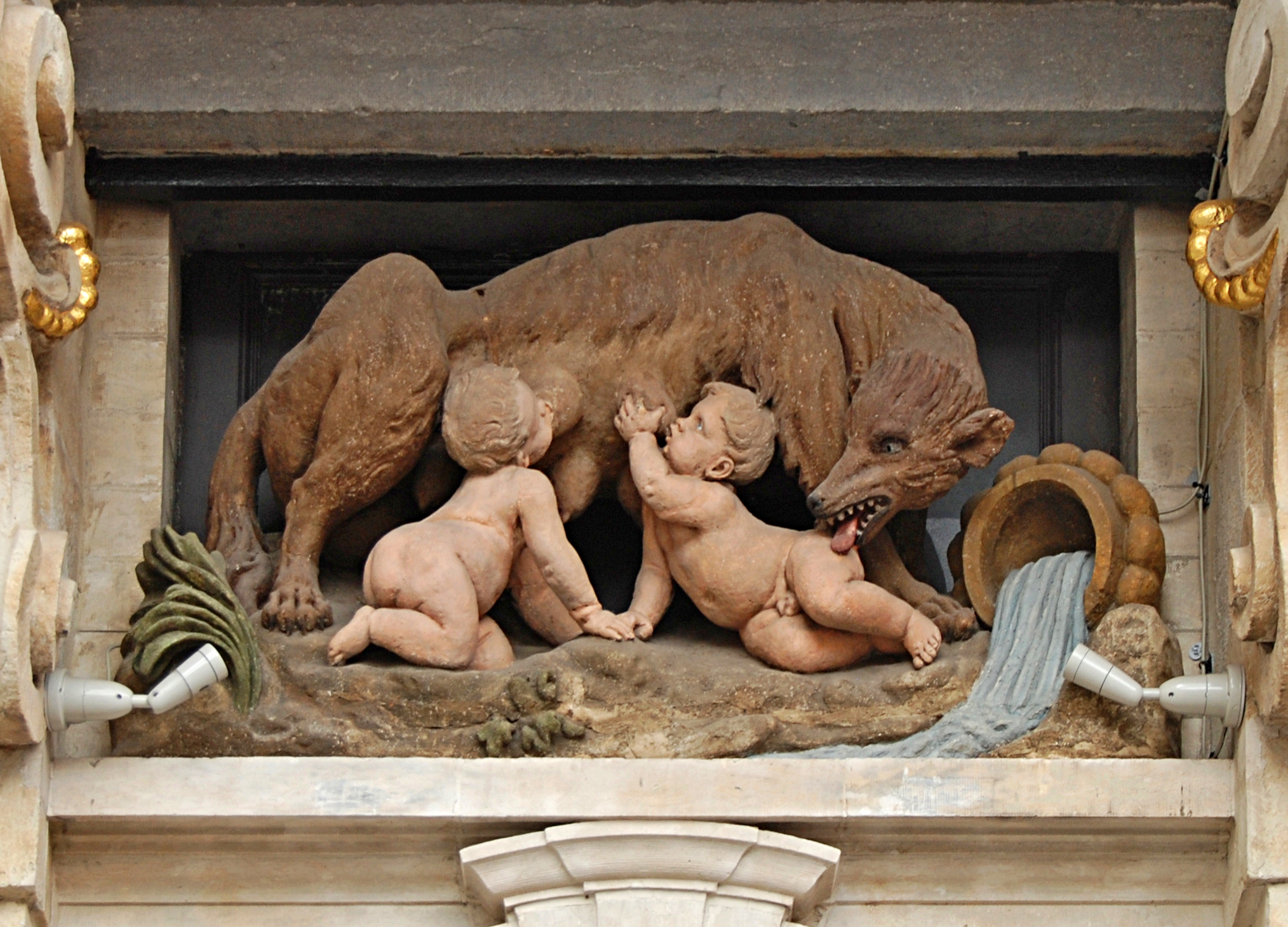
Romulus and Remus on the House of the She-wolf at the Grand-Place of Brussels

When they were young adults, they became involved in a dispute between supporters of Numitor and Amulius. As a result, Remus was taken prisoner and brought to Alba Longa. Both his grandfather and the king suspected his true identity. Romulus, meanwhile, had organized an effort to free his brother and set out with help for the city. During this time, they learned of their past and joined forces with their grandfather to restore him to the throne. Amulius was killed and Numitor was reinstated as king of Alba Longa. The twins set out to build a city of their own.

After arriving back in the area of the seven hills, they disagreed about the hill upon which to build. Romulus preferred the Palatine Hill, above the Lupercal; Remus preferred the Aventine Hill. When they could not resolve the dispute, they agreed to seek the gods' approval through a contest of augury. Remus saw 6 auspicious birds first, but Romulus saw 12 and claimed to have won divine approval. They disputed the result; Remus insulted Romulus's new city and was killed, either by Romulus or by one of his supporters. Romulus then went on to found the city of Rome, its institutions, government, military, and religious traditions. He reigned for many years as its first king.

== Primary sources ==
The origins of the different elements in Rome's foundation myth are a subject of ongoing debate. They may have come from the Romans' own Italic origins, or from Hellenic influences that were included later. Definitively identifying those original elements has so far eluded classicists. Roman historians dated the founding of Rome around 753 BC, but the earliest known written account of the myth is from the late 3rd century BC. There is an ongoing debate about how and when the "complete" fable came together.

Some elements are attested earlier than others, and the storyline and the tone were variously influenced by the circumstances and tastes of the different sources as well as by contemporary Roman politics and concepts of propriety. Whether the twins' myth was an original part of Roman myth or a later development is the subject of an ongoing debate. Sources often contradict one another. They include the histories of Livy, Plutarch, Dionysius of Halicarnassus, and Tacitus as well as the work of Virgil and Ovid. Quintus Fabius Pictor's work became authoritative to the early books of Livy's History of Rome, Dionysius of Halicarnassus's Roman Antiquities, and Plutarch's Life of Romulus.

These three works have been among the most widely read versions of the myth. In all three works, the tales of the lupercal and the fratricide are overshadowed by that of the twins' lineage and connections to Aeneas and the deposing of Amulius. The latter receives the most attention in the accounts. Plutarch dedicates nearly half of his account to the overthrow of their uncle.

=== Roman Antiquities (Dionysius) ===
Dionysius cites, among others, the histories of Pictor, Lucius Calpurnius Piso, Cato the Elder, Lucius Cincius Alimentus.

The first book of Dionysius's twenty-volume history of Rome does not mention Remus until chapter 71. After spending another 8 chapters discussing the background of their birth in Alba, he dedicates a total of 9 chapters to the tale (79–87). Most of that is spent discussing the conflict with Amulius.

He goes on to discuss the various accounts of the city's founding by others, and the lineage and parentage of the twins for another 8 chapters until arriving at the tale of their abandonment by the Tiber River. He spends the better part of the chapter 79 discussing the survival in the wild. Then the end of chapters 79 through 84 focuses on the account of their struggle with Amulius. Chapter 84 is an alternate, non-fantastical account of their survival; the augury and fratricide are discussed in chapters 85 to 88.

=== Ab Urbe Condita (Livy) ===
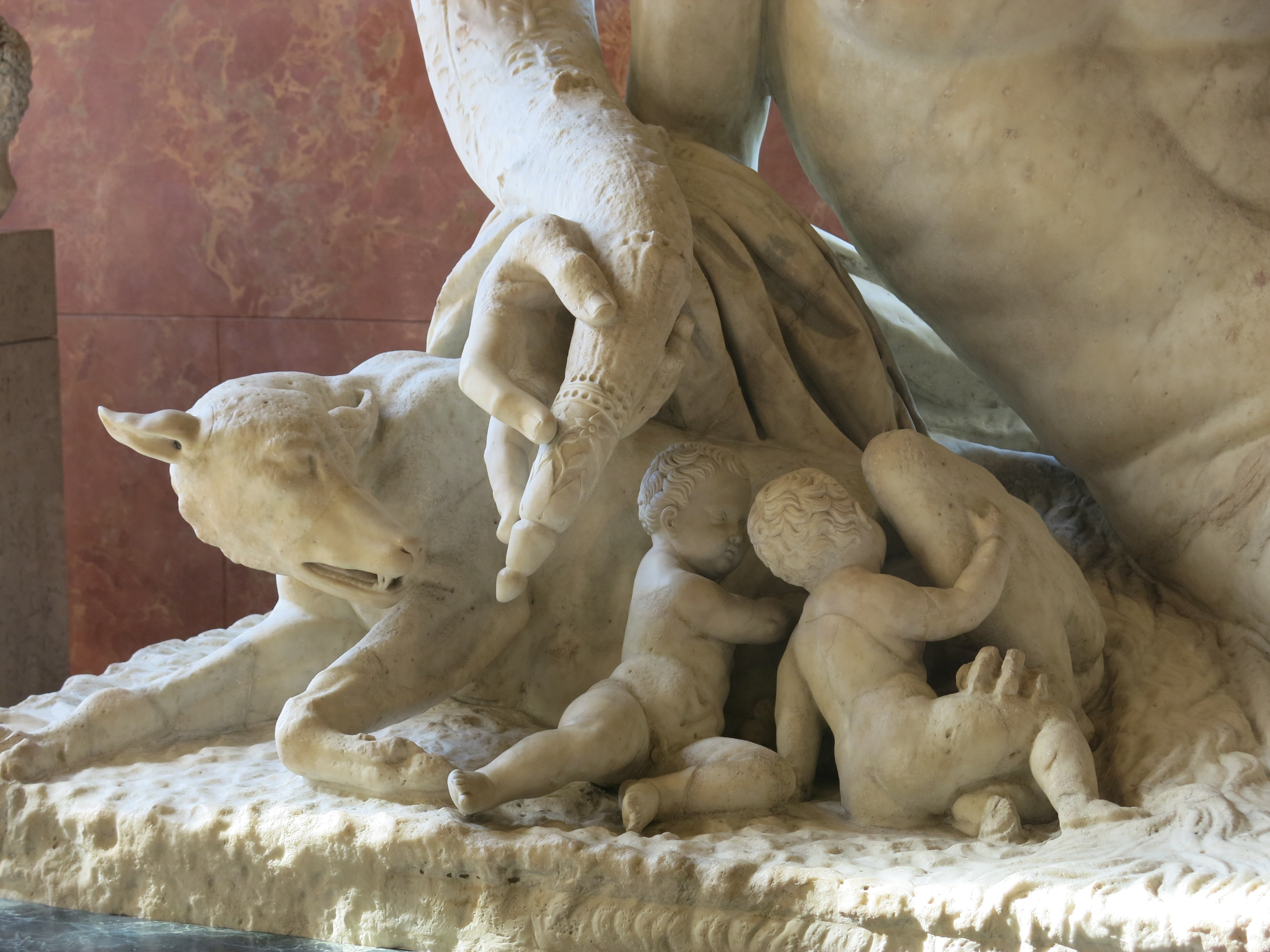
Detail of Romulus and Remus on the allegory of Tiber

Livy discusses the myth in chapters 4, 5, and 6 of his work's first book. p. 7 parentage 4 p. 8 survival. p. 8 the youth. 5 9–10 the struggle with Amulius. 6 p. 11 (the beginning only) the augury and fratricide.

=== Life of Romulus (Plutarch) ===
Plutarch relates the legend in chapters 2–10 of the Life of Romulus. He dedicates the most attention, nearly half the entire account, to conflict with Amulius.

=== Fasti (Ovid) ===
Fasti, the epic Latin poem by Ovid from the early 1st century AD, contains a complete account of the twins' tale. Notably, it relates a tale wherein the ghost of Remus appears to Faustulus and his wife, whom the poet calls "Acca". In the story, Remus appears to them while in bed and expresses his anger at Romulus's worker Celer for killing him on his own and affirms Romulus's fraternal love.

=== Roman History (Dio) ===
Roman History by Cassius Dio survives in fragments from various commentaries. They contain a more-or-less complete account. In them, he mentions an oracle that had predicted Amulius's death by a son of Numitor as the reason the Alban king expelled the boys. There is also a mention of "another Romulus and Remus" and another Rome having been founded long before on the same site.

=== Origo Gentis Romanae (unknown) ===
This work contains a variety of versions of the story. In one, there is a reference to a woodpecker bringing the boys food during the time they were abandoned in the wild. In one account of the conflict with Amulius, the capture of Remus is not mentioned. Instead, Romulus, upon being told of his true identity and the crimes suffered by him and his family at the hands of the Alban king, simply decided to avenge them. He took his supporters directly to the city and killed Amulius, afterwards restoring his grandfather to the throne.

=== Fragments and other sources ===
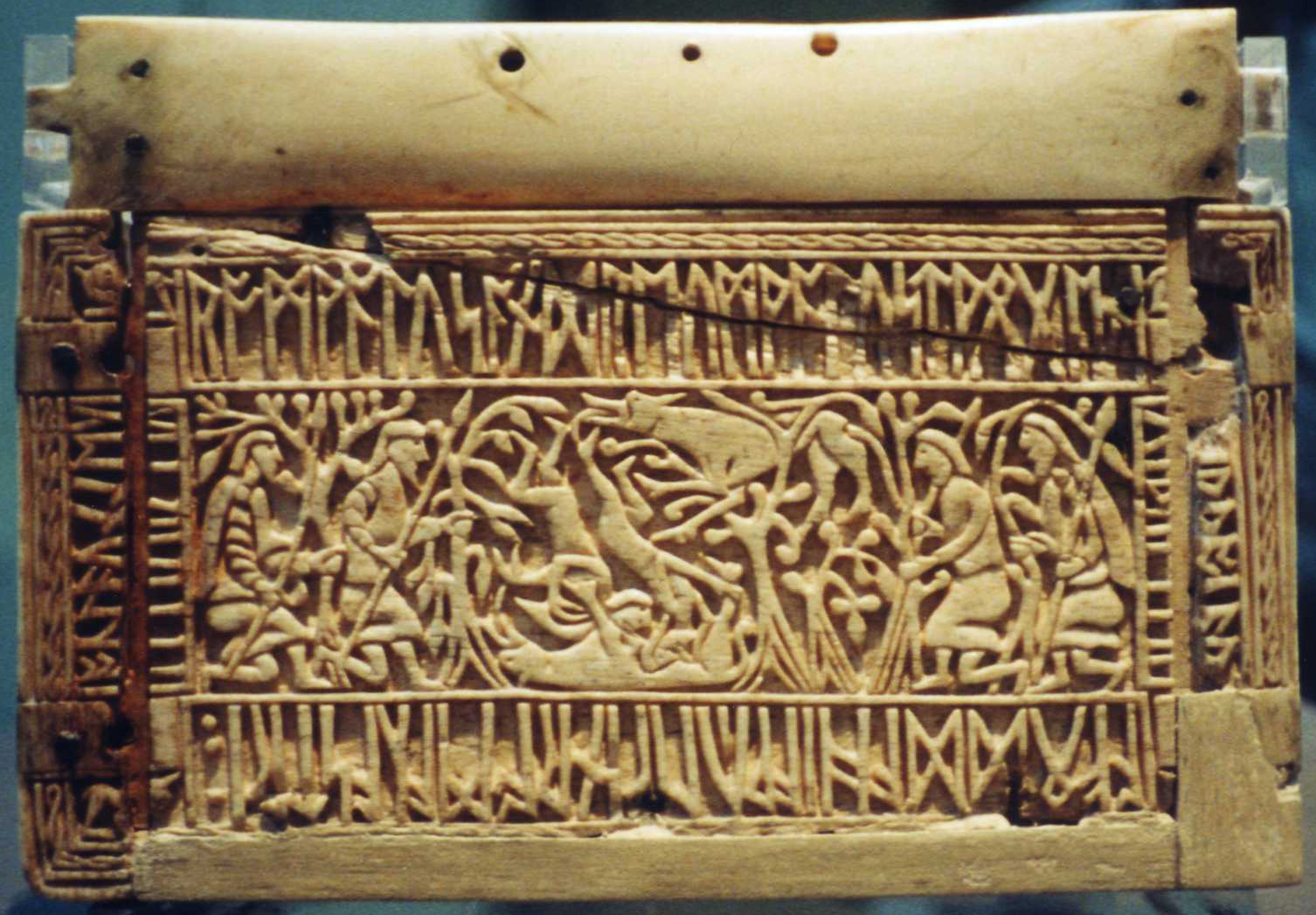
Panel of the 8th-century Anglo-Saxon Franks Casket

- Annals by Ennius is lost, but fragments remain in later histories.
- Roman History by Appian, in Book I "Concerning the Kings", is a fragment containing an account of the twins' parentage and origins.
- The City of God by Saint Augustine claims, in passing, that Remus was alive after the city's founding. Both he and Romulus established the Roman Asylum after the traditional accounts claimed that he had died.
- Bibliotheca historica by Diodorus Siculus, is a universal history, which survives mostly intact in fragments and has a complete recounting of the twins' origins, their youth in the shepherd community, and the contest of the augury and fratricide. In this version, Remus sees no birds at all and he is later killed by Celer, Romulus's worker.
- Origines by Cato the Elder, fragments of which survive in the work of later historians, is cited by Dionysius.
- Roman poet Juvenal calls them geminos Quirinos, an allusion to Quirinus.

=== Lost sources ===
- Quintus Fabius Pictor wrote in the 3rd century BC. His History, written in Greek, is the earliest-known history of Rome. He is cited by all three canonical works.
- Diocles of Peparethus wrote a history of Rome that is cited by Plutarch.
- Lucius Calpurnius Piso wrote a history cited by Dionysius.
- Quintus Aelius Tubero wrote a history cited by Dionysius.
- Marcus Octavius (otherwise unknown) wrote an account cited in the Origo Gentis.
- Licinius Macer (died 66 BC) wrote an account cited in the Origo Gentis.
- Vennonius wrote an account cited in the Origo Gentis.
- Juba II wrote a history cited by Plutarch

== Modern scholarship ==
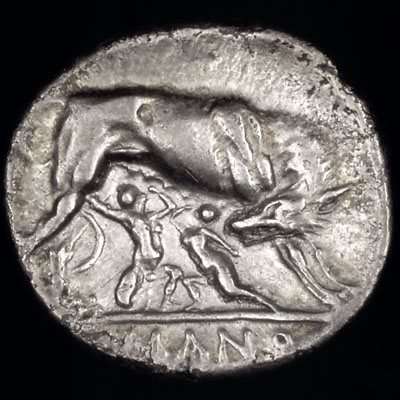
Romulus and Remus. Silver didrachm (6.44 g), c. 269–266 BC

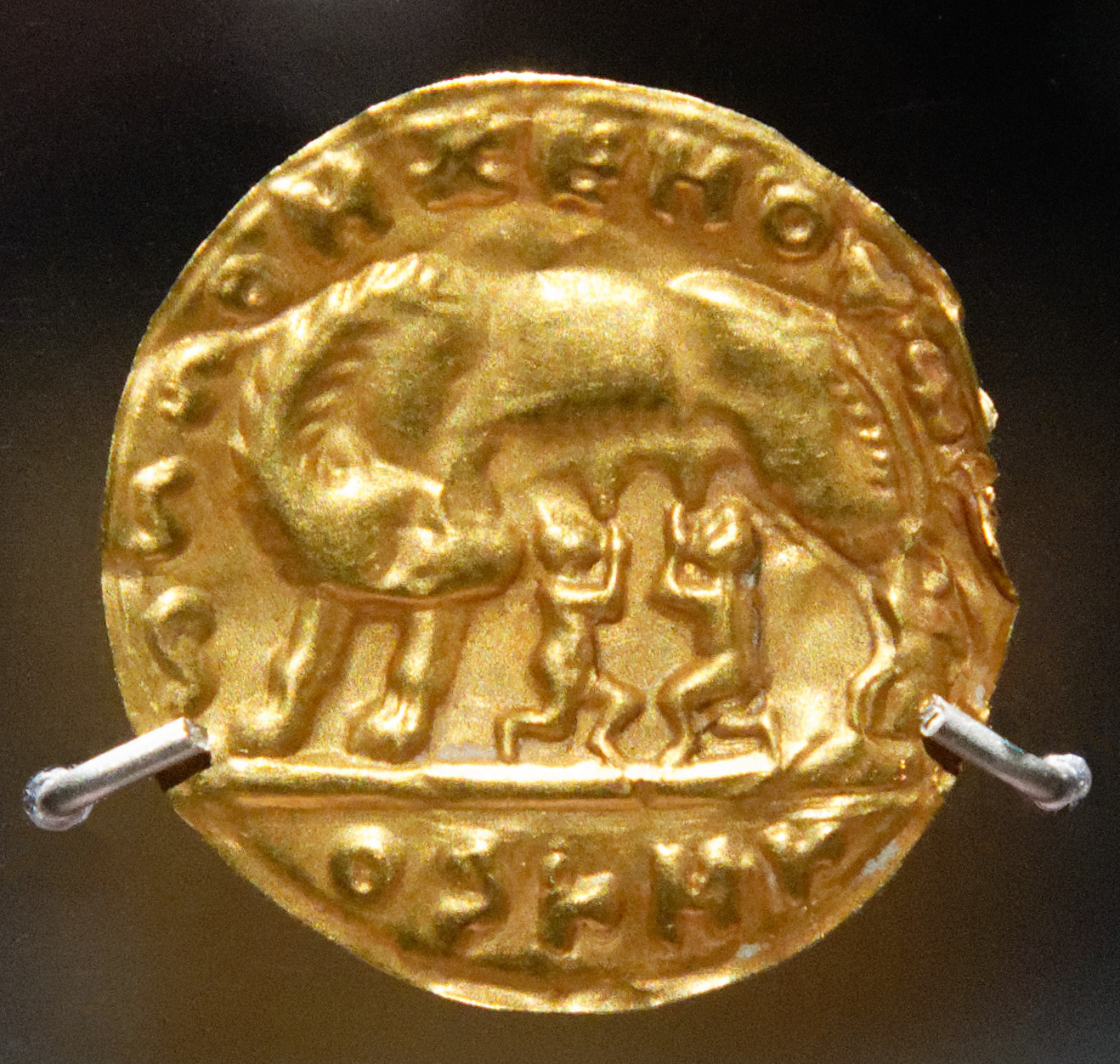
She-wolf suckling two infants ("Romulus and Remus"), with pseudo-Roman characters. Penjikent, 5th century AD, National Museum of Antiquities of Tajikistan (KP 208–243). Motif also known further east, from Ushrusana

Modern scholarship approaches the various known stories of Romulus and Remus as cumulative elaborations and later interpretations of Roman origin myth. Particular versions and collations were presented by Roman historians as an authoritative, official history trimmed of contradictions and untidy variants, to justify contemporary developments, genealogies and actions in relation to Roman morality. Other narratives appear to represent popular or folkloric tradition; some of these remain inscrutable in purpose and meaning. Wiseman sums the whole as the mythography of an unusually problematic foundation and early history.

The three canonical accounts of Livy, Dionysius, and Plutarch provide the broad literary basis for studies of Rome's founding mythography. They have much in common, but each is selective to its purpose. Livy's is a dignified handbook, justifying the purpose and morality of Roman traditions of his own day. Dionysius and Plutarch approach the same subjects as interested outsiders, and include founder-traditions not mentioned by Livy, untraceable to a common source and probably specific to particular regions, social classes or oral traditions. A Roman text of the late Imperial era, Origo gentis Romanae (The origin of the Roman people), is dedicated to the many "more or less bizarre", often contradictory variants of Rome's foundation myth, including versions in which Remus founds a city named Remuria, five miles from Rome, and outlives his brother Romulus.

Roman historians and Roman traditions traced most Roman institutions to Romulus. He was credited with founding Rome's armies, its system of rights and laws, its state religion and government, and the system of patronage that underpinned all social, political and military activity. In reality, such developments would have been spread over a considerable span of time. Some were much older and others much more recent. To most Romans, the evidence for the veracity of the legend and its central characters seemed clear and concrete, an essential part of Rome's sacred topography. One could visit the Lupercal, where the twins were suckled by the she-wolf, or offer worship to the deified Romulus-Quirinus at the "shepherd's hut", or see it acted out on stage, or simply read the Fasti.

The legend as a whole encapsulates Rome's ideas of itself, its origins and moral values. For modern scholarship, it remains one of the most complex and problematic of all foundation myths, particularly in the manner of Remus's death. Ancient historians had no doubt that Romulus gave his name to the city. Most modern historians believe his name a back-formation from the name Rome; the basis for Remus's name and role remain subjects of ancient and modern speculation. The myth was fully developed into something like an "official", chronological version in the Late Republican and early Imperial era; Roman historians dated the city's foundation to between 758 and 728 BC, and Plutarch reckoned the twins' birth year as 771 BC. A tradition that gave Romulus a distant ancestor in the semi-divine Trojan prince Aeneas was further embellished, and Romulus was made the direct ancestor of Rome's first Imperial dynasty. Possible historical bases for the broad mythological narrative remain unclear and disputed. The image of the she-wolf suckling the divinely fathered twins became an iconic representation of the city and its founding legend, making Romulus and Remus pre-eminent among the feral children of ancient mythography.

=== Historicity ===
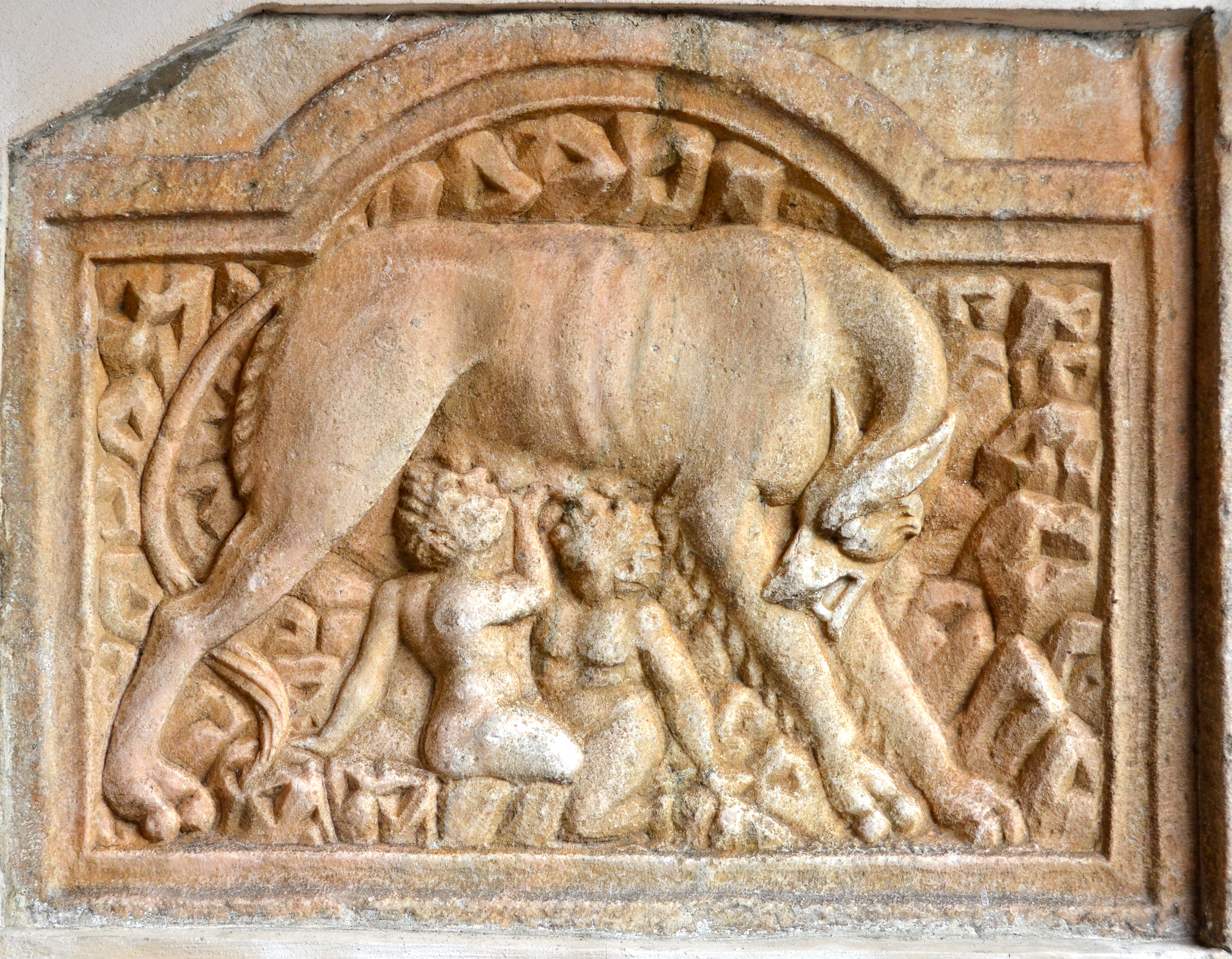
A Roman relief from the Cathedral of Maria Saal showing Romulus and Remus with the she-wolf

Current scholarship offers little evidence to support any particular version of the Roman foundation myth, including a historical Romulus or Remus. Starting with Fabius Pictor, the written accounts must have reflected the commonly held history of the city to some degree. The archaeologist Andrea Carandini is one of very few modern scholars who accept Romulus and Remus as historical figures, and dates an ancient wall on the north slope of the Palatine Hill to the mid-8th century BC and names it the Murus Romuli.

== Iconography ==
Ancient pictures of the Roman twins usually follow certain symbolic traditions, depending on the legend they follow: they either show a shepherd, the she-wolf, the twins under a fig tree, and one or two birds (Livy, Plutarch); or they depict two shepherds, the she-wolf, the twins in a cave, seldom a fig tree, and never any birds (Dionysius of Halicarnassus).

The twins and the she-wolf were featured on what might be the earliest silver coins minted in Rome.

The Franks Casket, an Anglo-Saxon ivory box (early 7th century AD), shows Romulus and Remus in an unusual setting, two wolves instead of one, a grove instead of one tree or a cave, four kneeling warriors instead of one or two gesticulating shepherds. According to one interpretation, and as the runic inscription ("far from home") indicates, the twins are cited here as the Dioscuri, helpers at voyages such as Castor and Polydeuces. Their descent from the Roman god of war predestines them as helpers on the way to war. The carver transferred them into the Germanic holy grove and has Odin's second wolf join them. Thus the picture served—along with five other ones—to influence "wyrd", the fortune and fate of a warrior king.

== In popular culture ==
- Duel of the Titans, (Italian: Romolo e Remo), a 1961 film starring Steve Reeves and Gordon Scott as the two brothers.
- The First King: Birth of an Empire (Il Primo Re), a 2019 Italian historical film by Matteo Rovere depicting the foundation of Rome. The film's script features a reconstructed Old Latin language.
- Romulus, a 2020 Italian TV series by Matteo Rovere about the founding of Rome. It also features a reconstructed Old Latin language.
- Alien: Romulus, a 2024 horror science fiction film drawing on the mythology of Romulus and Remus.

== Depictions in art ==
« Les Sabines » by Jacques-Louis David (musée du Louvre)

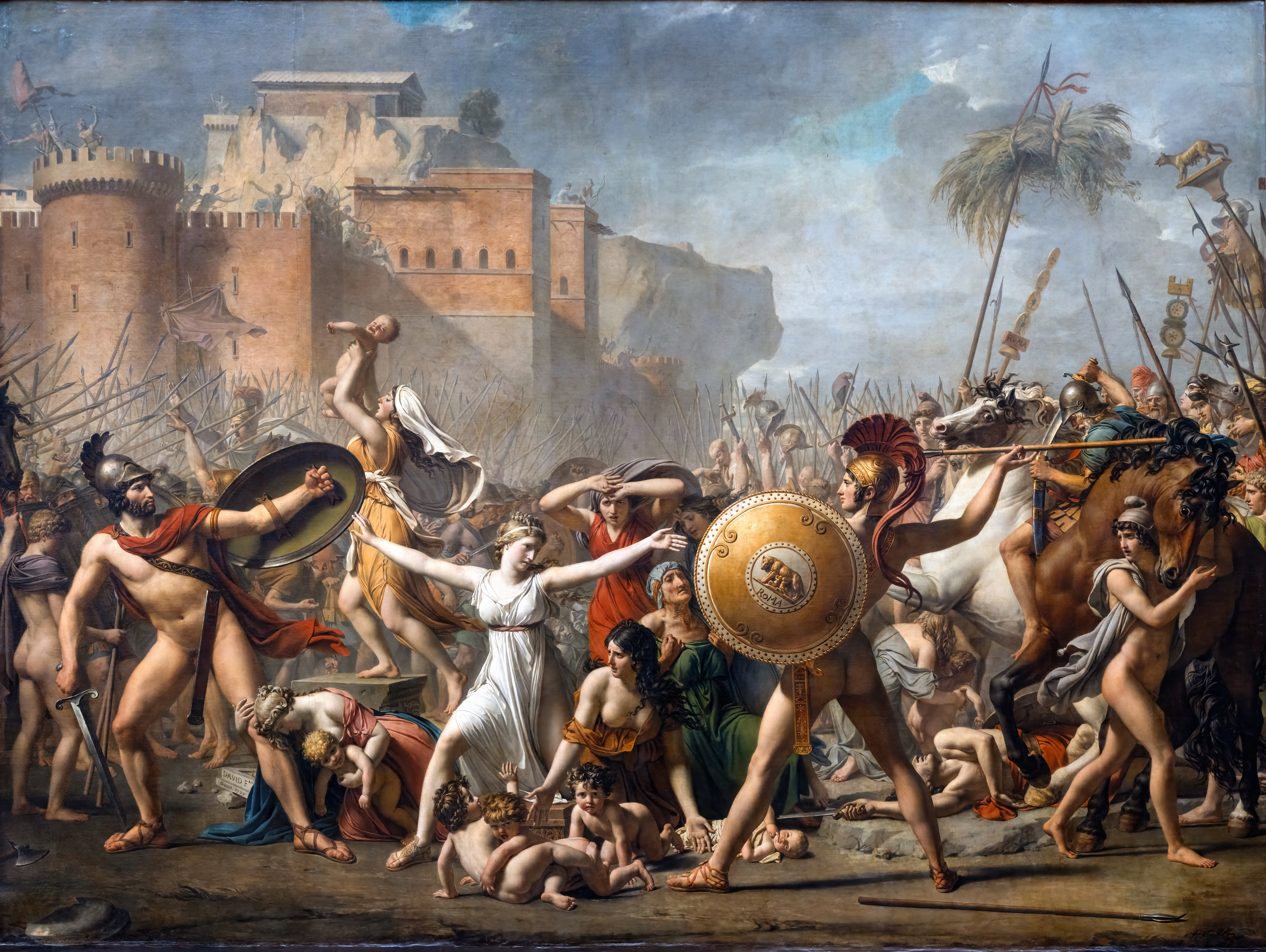

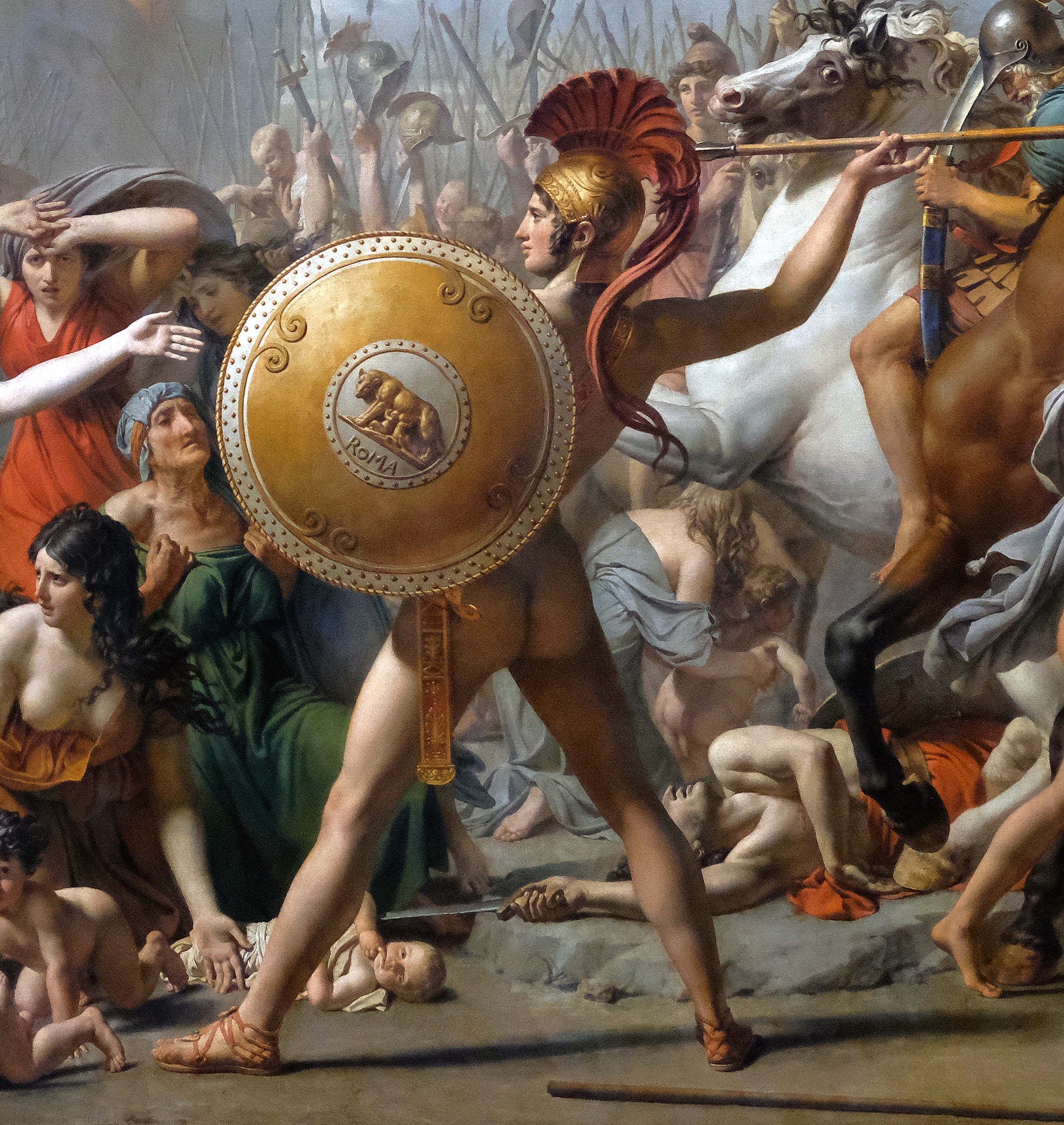
Romulus

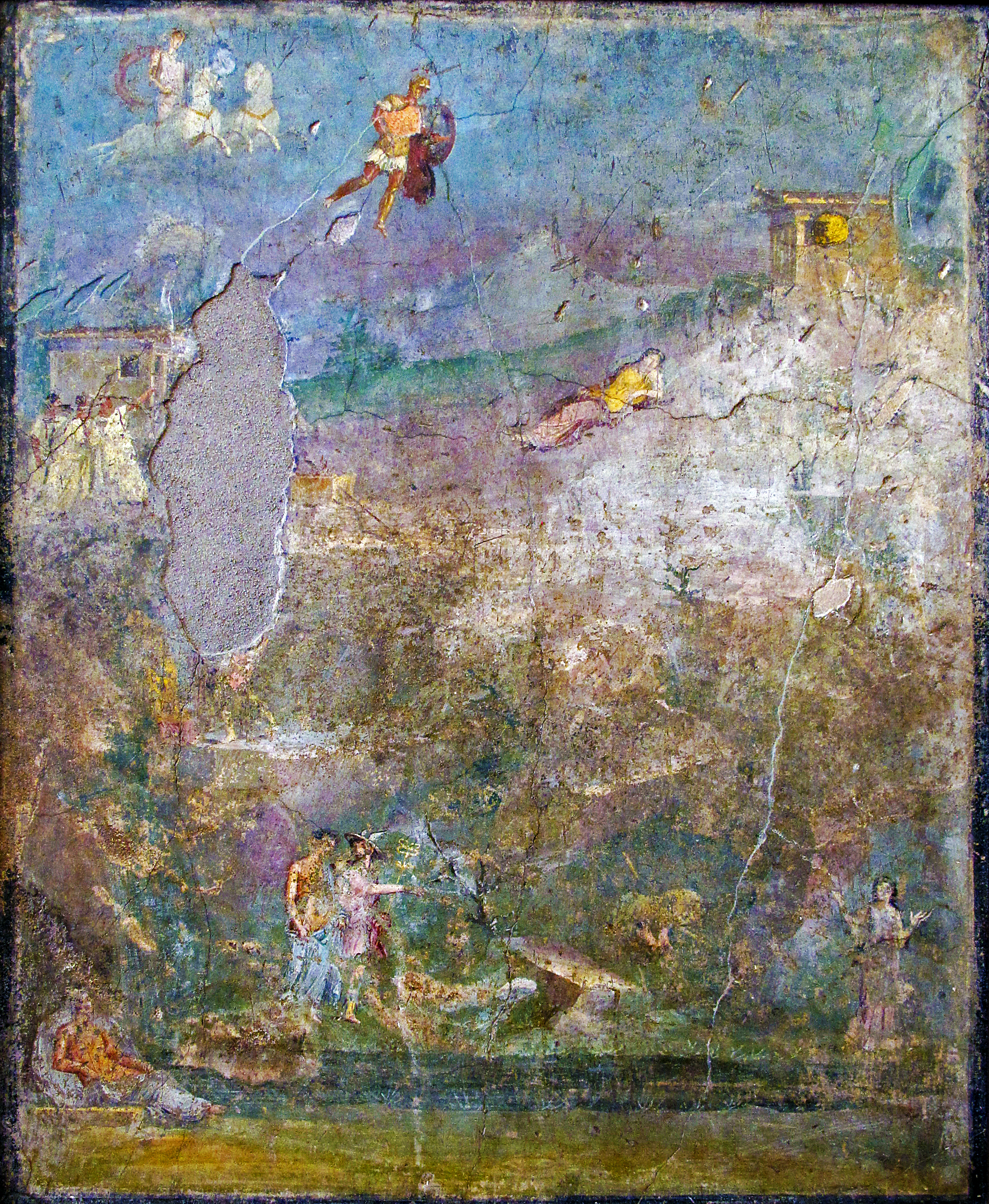
A fresco from Pompeii depicting the foundation of Rome. Sol riding in his chariot; Mars descending from the sky to Rhea Silvia lying in the grass; Mercury shows to Venus the she-wolf suckling the twins; in the lower corners of the picture: river-god Tiberinus and water-goddess Juturna. 35–45 AD

The myth has been an inspiration to artists throughout the ages. Particular focus has been paid to the rape of Ilia by Mars and the suckling of the twins by the she-wolf.

=== Palazzo Magnani ===
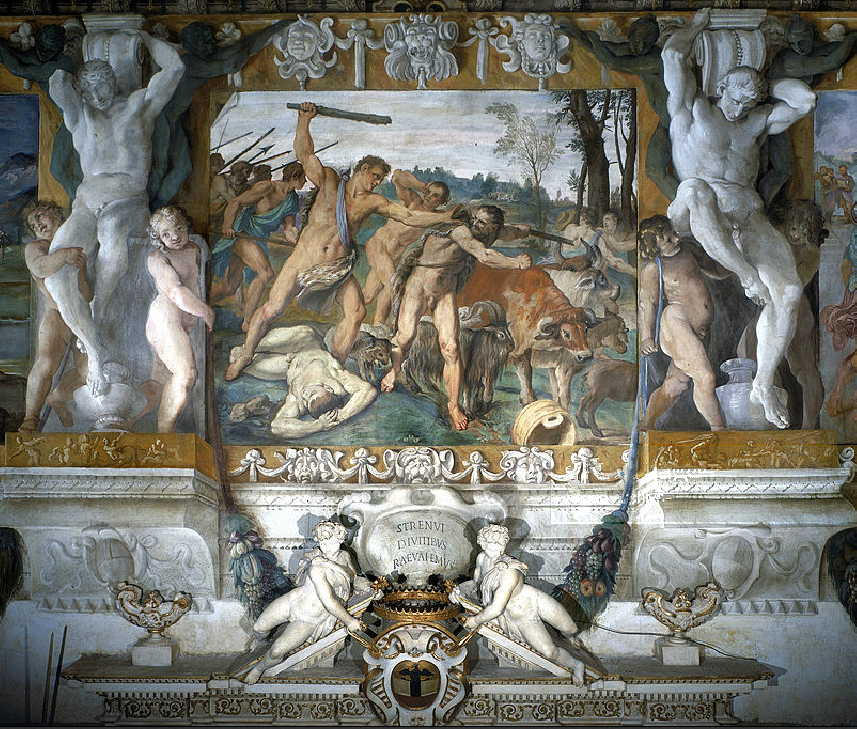
Remus and the Cattle Thieves (attributed to one or more of the Carraccis)

In the late 16th century, the wealthy Magnani family from Bologna commissioned a series of artworks based on the Roman foundation myth. The artists contributing works included a sculpture of Hercules with the infant twins by Gabriele Fiorini, featuring the patron's own face. The most important works were an elaborate series of frescoes collectively known as Histories of the Foundation of Rome by the Brothers Carracci: Ludovico, Annibale, and Agostino Carracci.

=== Fresco of Palazzo Trinci ===
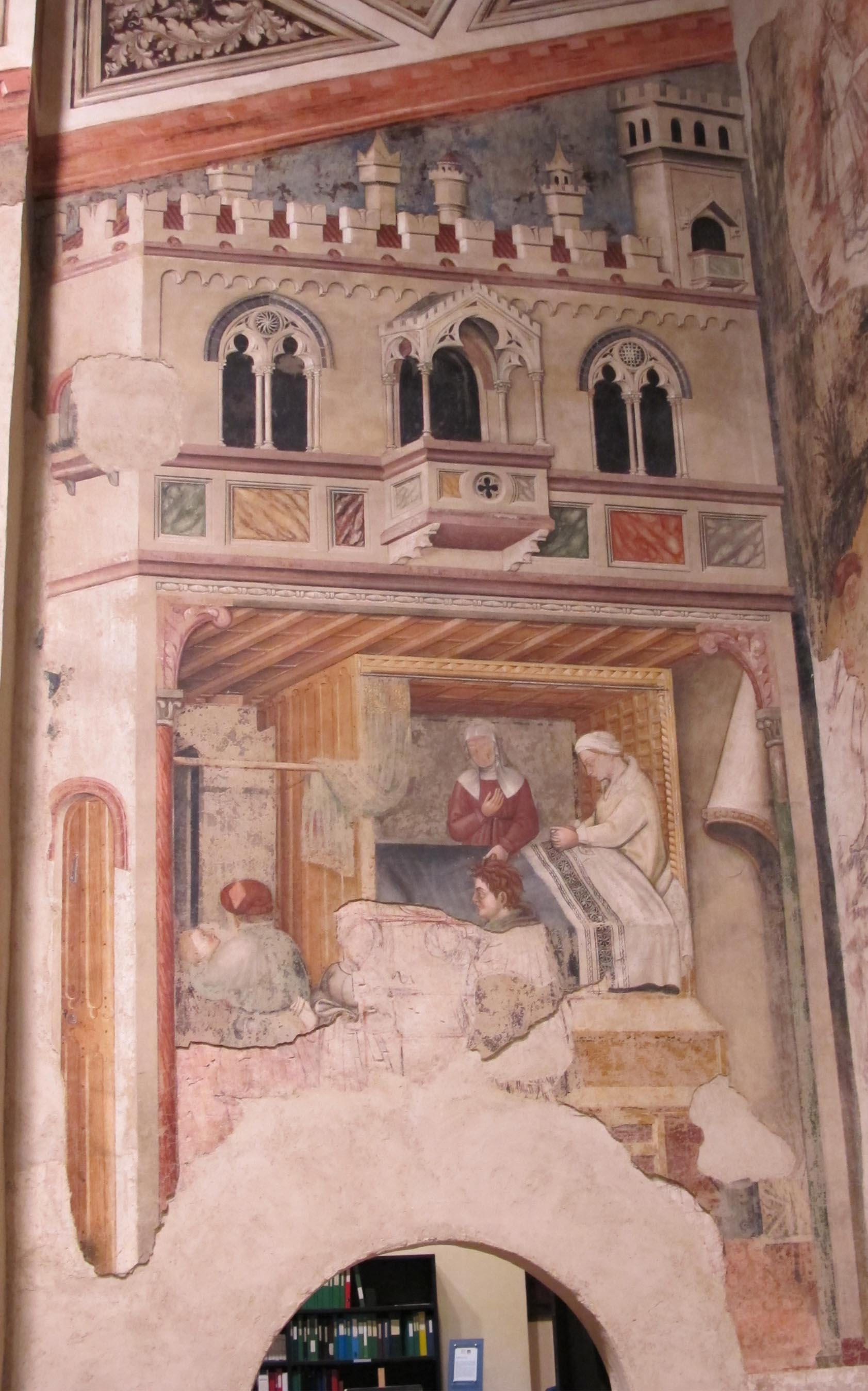
The birth of Romulus and Remus

The Loggia di Romolo e Remo is an unfinished, 15th-century fresco by Gentile da Fabriano depicting episodes from the legend in the Palazzo Trinci.

== See also ==
- Asena, a similar legend concerning the origin of the Turks
- Castor and Pollux
- The Golden Bough, a tale concerning Aeneas and Rome
- Greco-Roman world
- Hengist and Horsa, legendary brothers from the tale of the 5th-century AD Jutish invasion of Britain.
- Lares
- Manu and Yemo, a Proto-Indo-European story believed to be the origin of this myth
- Romulus of Fiesole, a 1st-century saint who was also abandoned in the wild and nursed by a she-wolf.
- Senius and Aschius, the legendary twin founders of Siena
- Cain and Abel, first sons of Adam and Eve

== Bibliography ==
=== Primary sources ===
- Dionysius of Halicarnassus (1937). Roman Antiquities. doi:10.4159/DLCL.dionysius_halicarnassus-roman_antiquities.1937. ISBN 9780674993525. – via digital Loeb Classical Library (subscription required)
- Livy (1919). History of Rome 1. doi:10.4159/DLCL.livy-history_rome_1.1919. ISBN 9780674991262. – via digital Loeb Classical Library (subscription required)
- Plutarch. "The life of Romulus". In Thayer (ed.). The Parallel Lives. Chicago: Loeb..
- Ovid (1931). Goold, G. P (ed.). Fasti. doi:10.4159/DLCL.ovid-fasti.1931. ISBN 9780674992795. – via digital Loeb Classical Library (subscription required)

=== Secondary sources ===
- Crawford, Michael Hewson (1985). Coinage and Money Under the Roman Republic: Italy and the Mediterranean Economy. University of California Press. ISBN 978-0-520-05506-3.
- Rodríguez Mayorgas, Ana (2010). "Romulus, Aeneas and the Cultural Memory of the Roman Republic" (PDF). Athenaeum. 98 (1): 89–109.
- Tennant, PMW (1988). "The Lupercalia and the Romulus and Remus Legend" (PDF). Acta Classical. XXXI: 81–93. ISSN 0065-1141. Archived from the original (PDF) on 10 May 2017.
- Wiseman, Timothy Peter (25 August 1995). Remus: A Roman Myth. Cambridge; New York, NY, USA: Cambridge University Press. ISBN 978-0-521-48366-7.
