= Isotope analysis in archaeology =

Isotope analysis has many applications in archaeology, from dating sites and artefacts, determination of past diets and migration patterns and for environmental reconstruction.

Information is determined by assessing the ratio of different isotopes of a particular element in a sample. The most widely studied and used isotopes in archaeology are carbon, oxygen, nitrogen, strontium and calcium.

An isotope is an atom of an element with an abnormal number of neutrons, changing their atomic mass. Isotopes can be subdivided into stable and unstable or radioactive. Unstable isotopes decay at a predictable rate over time. The first stable isotope was discovered in 1913, and most were identified by the 1930s. Archaeology was relatively slow to adopt the study of isotopes. Whereas chemistry, biology and physics, saw a rapid uptake in applications of isotope analysis in the 1950s and 1960s, following the commercialisation of the mass spectrometer. It wasn't until the 1970s, with the publication of works by Vogel and Van Der Merwe (1977) and DeNiro and Epstein (1978; 1981) that isotopic analysis became a mainstay of archaeological study.

== Isotopes ==
=== Carbon ===
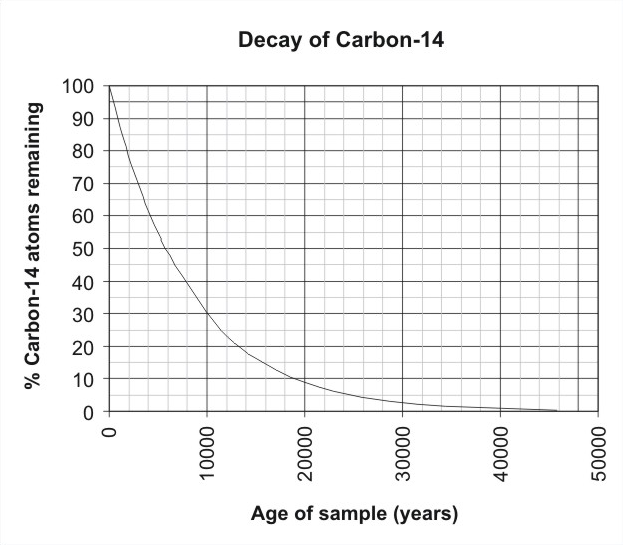
The decay rate of the radioactive ^{14}C isotope, used in radiocarbon dating artefacts (public domain image).

Carbon is present in all biological material including skeletal remains, charcoal and food residues and plays an integral role in the dating of materials, through radiocarbon dating. The ratio of different carbon isotopes naturally fluctuates over time, and, by analysing the composition of carbon dioxide (CO_{2}) in ancient air bubbles trapped in ice cores, a chronological record of these fluctuations can be constructed. Primary producers (such as grasses) absorb and sequester CO_{2} during photosynthesis, these plants are then eaten by consumers (such as cows, and later humans) which inherit this same CO_{2} signature. Therefore, by matching the carbon isotope ratios from a sample to ratios from the ice core record, the sample can be assigned to a broad period. After death, an organism no longer absorbs CO_{2}, ^{14}C's instability causes its concentration to decrease over time The predictable rate at which this occurs is known as an element's decay rate.

=== Oxygen and nitrogen ===
Oxygen and nitrogen occur in the form of different isotopes which vary in their proportions geospatially and climatically. Oxygen is absorbed into the body in the form of H_{2}O and is used in the growth of tissues. As with carbon, oxygen isotopic ratio variances can be attributed to specific locations and the proportion of O isotopes can therefore contribute to the reconstruction of past climates, understanding of diets and water consumption, seasonality, mobility patterns, life history and elements of culture.

=== Strontium ===
Strontium is naturally deposited in hydroxyapatite, the mineral component of bones and teeth, following its consumption in food and water. Each locale has a unique Sr isotope ratio and, therefore, the ratio found in a bone or enamel sample can be cross referenced against a record of environmental Sr ratios and assigned to a region. Dental enamel forms in childhood, therefore, Sr extracted from dental enamel reflects the environment in which an individual lived during infancy and childhood. Bone, however, is constantly being renewed and can therefore be used to infer the adult diet and location of the individual. As such, if the Sr ratios are the analogous in the bones and teeth, it can be inferred that an individual remained in the same general region throughout their life. If the ratios differ, the individual's birthplace and death place can be mapped, allowing inference of their movements. This has been applied to determine the functionality and significance of Stonehenge, finding that both the visitors and cattle used in feasting travelled great distances, with Sr ratios attributed to both Scotland and Wales.

=== Calcium ===
Alongside strontium, dietary calcium is deposited in bones and teeth, however Ca is more readily deposited than Sr in humans and animals who consume primarily or exclusively plants. Therefore, the greater the Ca:Sr ratio in sample, the more herbivorous the animal was likely to be.

== Methodology ==
=== Isolation ===
Before the isotopes can be separated and a ratio can be determined, the desired component of the tissue must be isolated. Such components include collagen, carbonate and apatite. Each component requires different means of isolation, and methods must be further specialised to account for the varied levels of decay and contamination which may occur as a result of taphonomy.

In the case of collagen, there are three main modes of isolation:

- Decalcification of small bone chunks in a 1-5% hydrochloric acid solution. If further decayed organic matter remains, a soak in 0.1 molar sodium hydroxide may be required. The isolated collagen is then freeze dried.
- Demineralisation of small bone chunks in sodium salt to separate collagen, which is then freeze-dried
- Demineralisation of powdered bone in 8% hydrochloric acid, slow hydrolysis in pH 3. If required, a further soak in 0.1 molar sodium hydroxide.

The latter is most effective in the instance of very poorly preserved bone, although it also faces an increased risk of contamination by other organic matter. Consequently, the supposedly isolated sample should be analysed and only tested if the readings fall within an acceptable range; most mass spectrometers now include a gas analyser as well as a combustion chamber to streamline this process.

=== Mass spectrometry ===
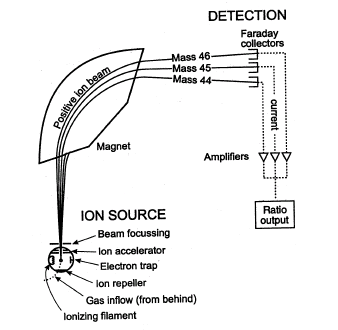
Mass spectrometer, used to separate and measure elemental ions (public domain image).

Mass spectrometry is used to separate and measure distinct isotopes present in a sample. Archaeologists typically employ isotope ratio mass spectrometers or IRMSs, consisting of an inlet system, ion source, mass analyser and multiple ion detectors.

The sample is usually introduced into the mass spectrometer as a gas, with oxygen and carbon being introduced as carbon dioxide.

Strontium is too unstable to be easily handled in gas form, instead, it is evaporated and ionised in a vacuum. This use of a solid source is referred to as thermal ionisation mass spectrometry or TIMS. More recently, strontium isotopes have been at the centre of discussion and investigation into the use of laser ablation inductively coupled mass spectrometry (ICP-MS), which is also of interest due to its less invasive nature.

Electron bombardment ionises the gas, allowing the molecules to be focused into a beam which is then split by mass into smaller beams - forming a "mass spectrum". The relative intensities of the different beams is then measured in the ion collector and relayed as isotope ratios.

== Application and examples ==
=== Paranthropus dietary reconstruction ===
Plants can be characterised by the ratio of carbon isotopes they sequester, due to alterations in the evolution of photosynthetic biochemical pathways. So-called C3 plants fix CO_{2} into a 3-carbon molecule and have a greater proportion of ^{12}C, whereas C4 plants fix it into a 4-carbon molecule, and have a carbon isotope signature with higher ^{13}C. This signature translates across trophic levels and can be used to determine the diets of people and animals. Isotopic analysis has been used to illuminate the diets of the different species of the Paranthropus genus. It was determined that P. boisei had a reduced ratio of C3:C4, meaning they likely consumed a greater proportion of grasses and sedges than trees, shrubs and temperature grasses. P. aethiopicus showed a similar trend, whereas P. robustus was a generalist, with a broader dietary niche. Furthermore, carbon isotope analysis shows that around 2.37 million years ago, hominins displayed a widespread shift to favour C4 plants.

=== "Ötzi the Iceman" and reconstructing Neolithic lifeways ===
Ötzi is a Neolithic man who, in 1991, was found in an Alpine glacier between Austria and Italy. Ötzi is exceptionally well preserved since his body was dehydrated and encapsulated in glacial ice. Radiocarbon dating gave an age of approximately 5,200 years old. TIMS, ICP-MS and gas mass spectrometry have all been applied to the strontium, lead, and oxygen isotopes in Ötzi's bones and teeth. His teeth indicated a likely birth and early childhood near to where the Eisack and Rienz rivers confluence. In his adulthood, however, Ötzi's bones suggest that he moved to the lower Vinschgau and Etsch valley. More recent isotopic data, gathered from his gut contents, provides yet another timescale and hint that Ötzi's movement could be attributable to seasonal migration.

=== White Sands trackway and peopling of North America ===
The earliest compelling evidence for human habitation of the Americas comes from the Clovis complex, between 11,050 and 10,800 ^{14}C yr B.P. However, a series of human tracks were identified at White Sands National Park, New Mexico, which have been dated contentiously dated to between 23,000 and 21,000 years ago - during the Last Glacial Maximum. Alongside anatomically modern humans, the trackway shows impressions created by a Columbian mammoth and a giant ground sloth. The upper biostratigraphic limit for when the impressions were made could therefore be determined by consideration of the extinction dates of mammoths and ground sloths. More precise dates were able to be gained via radiocarbon dating of ditch grass (ruppia cirrhosa) embedded in the prints. These seeds produced a date of 23,000-21,000 years ago.

However, ^{14}C dates are not infallible, and this remains a topic of debate. A recent counterproposal posits that the trackways were, in fact, created by the Clovis culture and the pre-existing proposed dates of first habitation should not be moved. False dates may have been produced as older strata containing the seeds could have been eroded and displaced onto the damp clay, before being impressed in by footsteps. Alternatively, aquatic plants like ditch grass reflect the ^{14}C levels in their environment when living, if ^{14}C was deficient in the habitat, this could imply a false date.
