= Lellia Cracco Ruggini =

Italian historian (1931–2021)

- Born: 20 September 1931; Milan
- Died: 27 June 2021 (aged 89)
- Education: University of Pavia; University of Turin (PhD)
- Occupations: Historian, professor

Lellia Cracco Ruggini (20 September 1931 – 27 June 2021) was an Italian historian of Late Antiquity and professor emerita of the University of Turin. Her particular interests were in economic and social history, the history of ideas, and modern and ancient historiography. She specialized in the period from the second to seventh centuries AD.

== Early life and education ==
Ruggini was born in Milan on 20 September 1931. In 1954 she graduated from the University of Pavia with a degree in literature and was awarded a PhD in 1963 by the University of Turin.

== Career ==
From 1957 to 1968 Ruggini taught Greek and Roman history at the University of Pavia, becoming Libera Docente of Roman history and Latin epigraphy in 1963. She was Professor of Latin epigraphy at Pavia from 1965 to 1967.

She was director of the Institute of Ancient History at Turin University from 1968 to 1975, where she taught Roman history, Greek history and Latin epigraphy within the faculty of literature and philosophy. In 1989 she was elected as a member of the Academy of Europe. In 1995 she became professor emerita at Turin University. She was elected a foreign correspondent of the Académie des Inscriptions et Belles Lettres, France, in 2004, and advanced to become a foreign associate in 2010.

She held fellowships of the Italian Institute of Historical Study “Benedetto Croce” at Naples, the School for Advanced Studies at Paris, at the American Academy in Rome and twice made fellow of the Institute for Advanced Study at Princeton New Jersey.

She was co-director of the New History Magazine, of the Italian History Magazine, and from 1962 to 1967 she was secretary of Athenaeum review.

She was a member of the Turin Academy of Science, the Lincean Academy, the National Society of Antiquaries of France (since 1991), the Institute of France, the European Academy at London, the Association for Late Antiquity at Paris and the Association for Late Antique Studies at Naples.

== Prizes ==
- 1962 "Alessandro Bonavera" prize awarded by Accademia delle Scienze of Turin
- 1966 "Stefano Iacini" prize for the best history book, awarded by the Cassa di Risparmio delle Province Lombarde, Milan

== Publications ==
She published over 300 journal articles and books. Some of the most notable are:

- 1961, 2001: Economia e società nell’ Italia Annonaria. Rapporti fra agricoltura e commercio dal IV al VI secolo d. C.
- 1966: Un riflesso del mito di Alessandro nell’Historia Augusta » (in Beiträge zur Historia Augusta Forschung, 3).
- 1972: Simboli di battaglia ideologica nel tardo Ellenismo (Roma, Atene, Costantinopoli; Numa, Empedocle, Cristo) » (in Studi Storici in onore di Ottorino Bertolini, I).
- 1974: Leggenda e realtà degli Etiopi nella cultura tardoimperiale » (in Atti del IV Congresso Int. di St. Etiopici).
- 1987: Storia totale di una piccola città : Vicenza romana » (in Storia di Vicenza, I).
- 1989: Arnaldo Momigliano e il Tardoantico » (in Omaggio ad Arnaldo Momigliano : Storia e storiografia sul mondo antico).
- 1989: La città imperiale » (in Storia di Roma, IV).
- 1992: Acque e lagune da periferia del mondo a fulcro di una nuova civilitas » (in Storia di Venezia, I).
- 1993: Il Tardoantico : per una tipologia dei punti critici » (in Storia di Roma, Einaudi, III, 1).
- 1996, 1997, 2000: Introduzione : La Storia Antica oggi » (in Storia Antica : come leggere le fonti).
- 2003: Iatrosofistica pagana, “filosofia” cristiana e medicina (IV-VI secolo) » (in Consuetudinis amor. Fragments d’histoire culturelle (IIe-VIe siècle) : Mélanges en l’honneur de Jean-Pierre Callu).
- 2006: La sessualità nell’etica pagano-cristiana tardoantica » (in LIII Settimana del CISAM, I)
- 2008: Roma e i Barbari in età tardoantica » (in Roma e i Barbari. La nascita di un nuovo mondo, catalogue de l’exposition).
- 2008: Gli studi storici sul Tardoantico in Italia nell’età di Riegl » (in Alois Riegl (1858-1905) un secolo dopo).
- 2008: Terre e acque : città e campagne fra antichità e medioevo » (in LV Settimana del CISAM, I).
- 2008: Le amicizie “europee” di Gregorio Magno e la sua “politica delle reliquie” » (in Gregorio Magno e la Sardegna. Convegno Int.).
- 2009: Alimentare i cittadini, i rustici e i milites fra Tardoantico e Alto Medioevo » (in LVI Settimana di studio del CISAM, I).
- 2009: Il Codice Teodosiano e le eresie » (in Droit, religion et société dans le Code Théodosien).
- 2010: Tra fine IV e inizî V secolo in due dittici : qualche problema » (in Il secolo dei dittici, Seminario Int.).
- 2011: Pontifices : un caso di osmosi linguistica » (in Pagans and Christians in the Roman Empire : The Breaking of a Dialogue (IVth-VIth Century A.D.). Proceedings of the International Conference at the Monastery of Bose).
- 2011: Gli Ebrei in età tardoantica. Presenze, intolleranze, incontri.
