= Vincenzo Caprile =

Italian painter

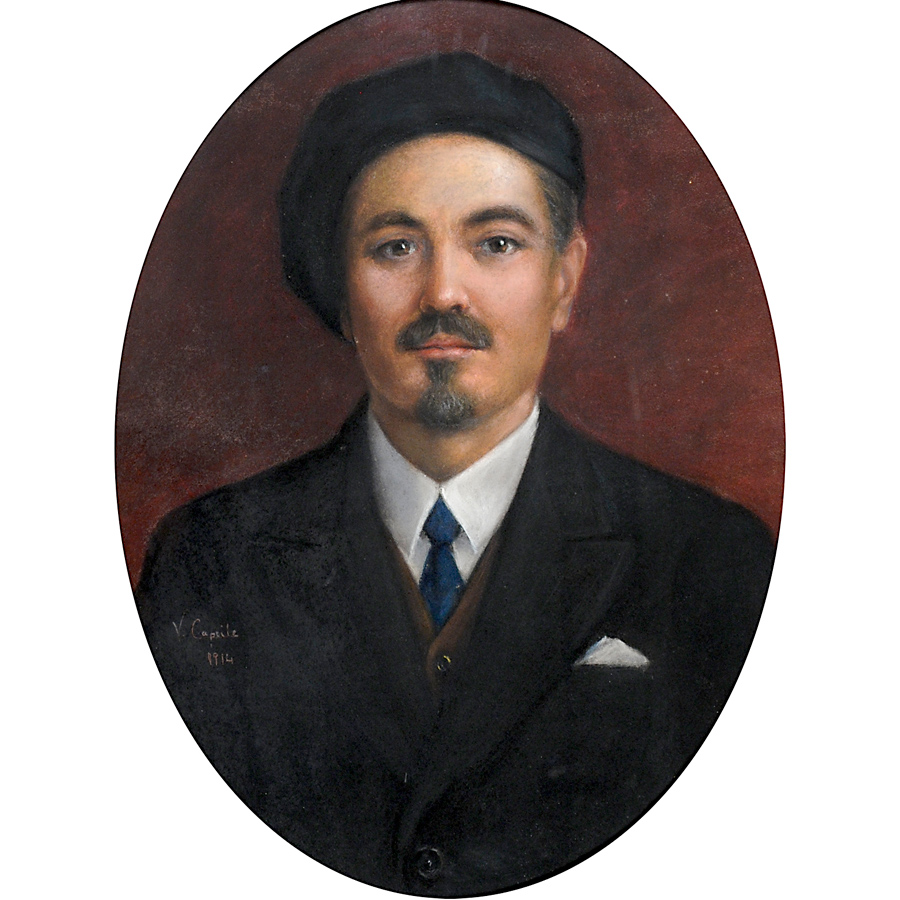
- Self-Portrait (1914)
- Born: 24 June 1856; Naples, Italy
- Died: 23 June 1936 (aged 79); Naples, Italy
- Known for: Painter

Vincenzo Caprile (1856 – 1936) was an Italian painter, mainly of genre scenes and landscapes depicting the coast of Amalfi.

== Biography ==
He studied at the Academy of Fine Arts of Naples, with Domenico Morelli and Gabriele Smargiassi. As an Impressionist painter, he was associated with the School of Resina, which included Federico Rossano, Marco de Gregorio and Giuseppe De Nittis. He made his debut in 1873, at the "Society for the Promotion of the Fine Arts". From 1874 to 1888, he was an active participant in exhibitions at home and abroad. In 1888, he was named an Honorary Professor at the Academy. For the last third of his life, he lived in Venice, alternating between paintings of lagoons and Neapolitan landscapes.

His seascape scenes depict the daily life of the area, and the rocks and beaches of Positano, Amalfi, Ravello and the Gulf of Salerno. Among his works are La Fanciulla di Positano and the portrait of the owner of the hotel Covo dei Saraceni. Along with other Neapolitan Impressionist painters, such as Luca Postiglione, Pietro Scoppetta, Vincenzo Volpe, Edoardo Matania, Attilio Pratella, Giuseppe Casciaro, Giuseppe Chiarolanza, Gaetano Esposito, Vincenzo Migliaro, Vincenzo Irolli, he helped decorate the rooms of the Caffè Gambrinus in Naples.

Most of his works are in private collections, but some may be seen in museums, including the Galleria Nazionale d'Arte Moderna and the civic museum at Castel Nuovo.

== Gallery ==
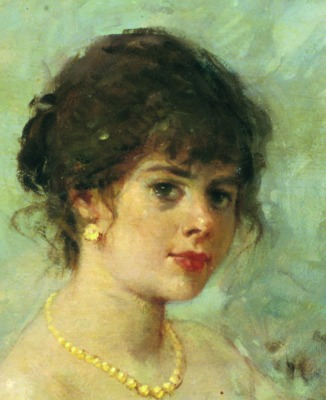
Portrait of a Woman

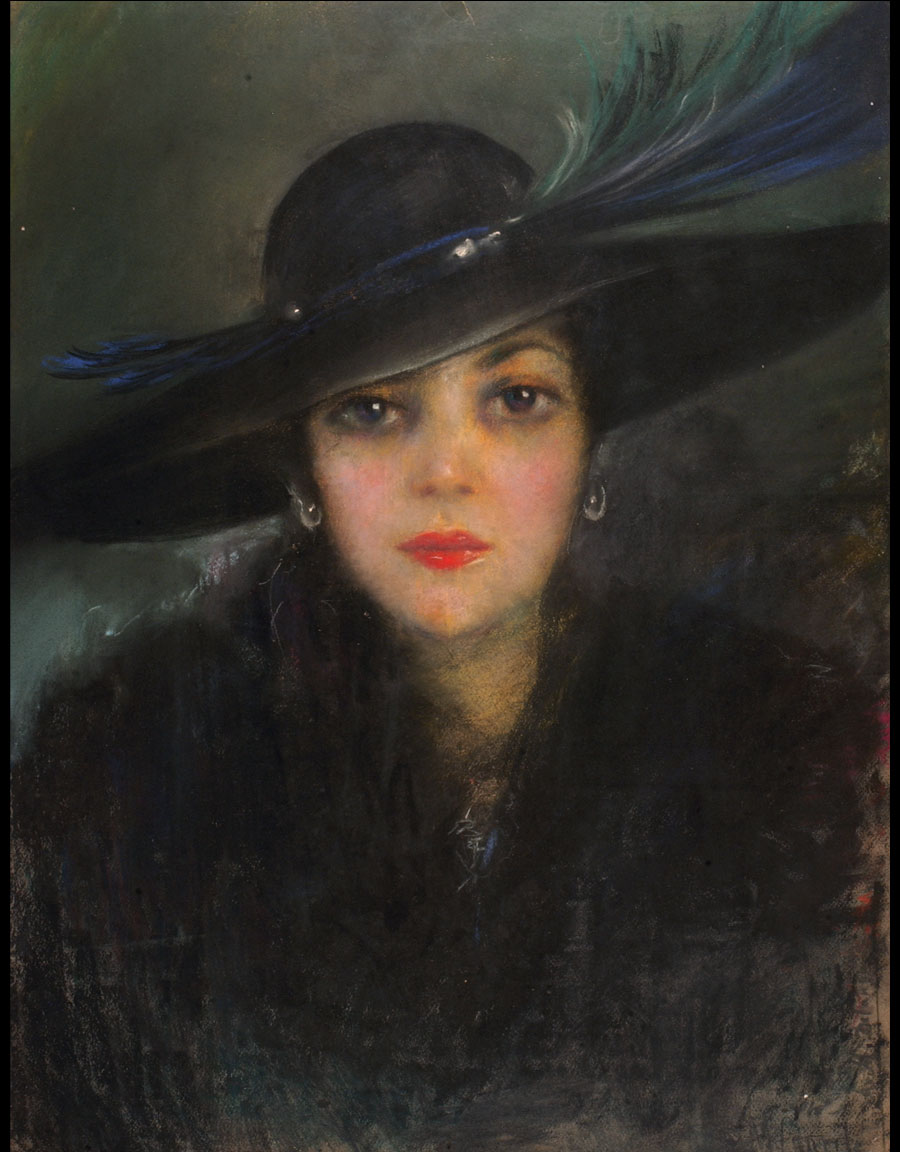
Portrait of a Woman

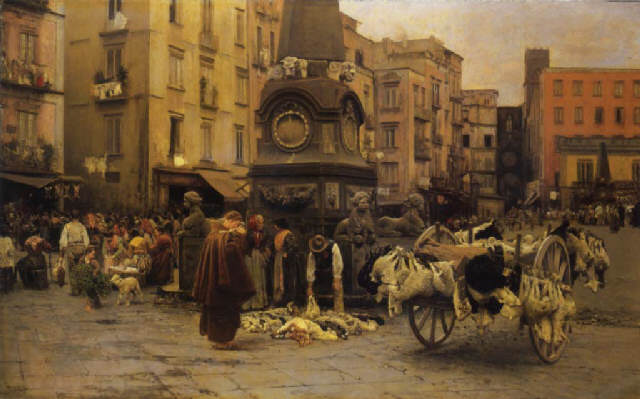
Easter Market in Naples

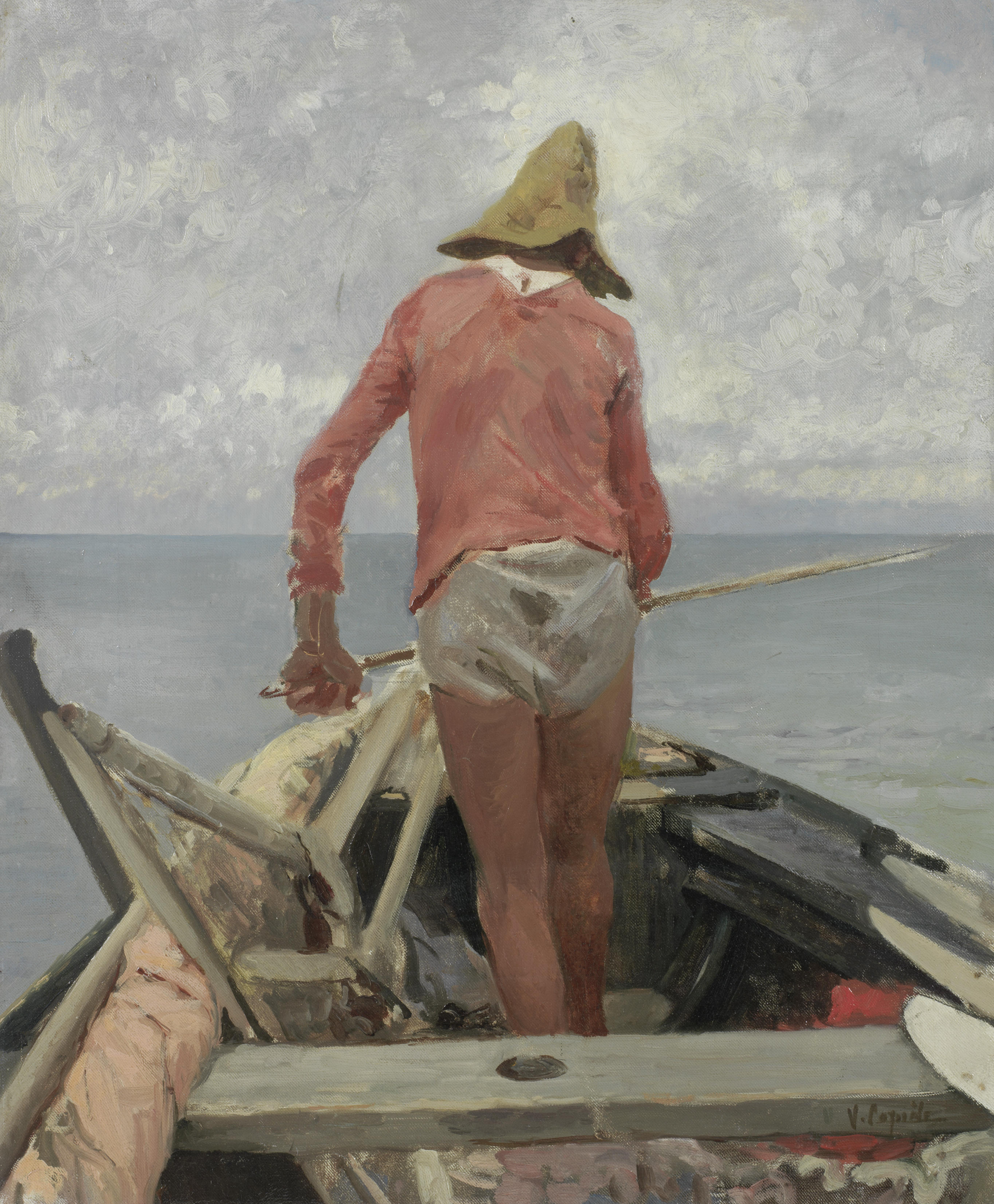
Study of a Fisherman

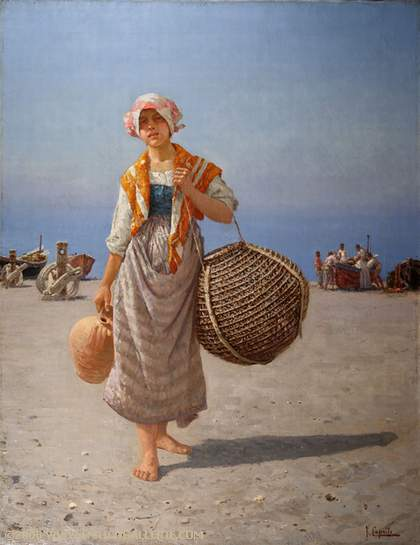
Water seller

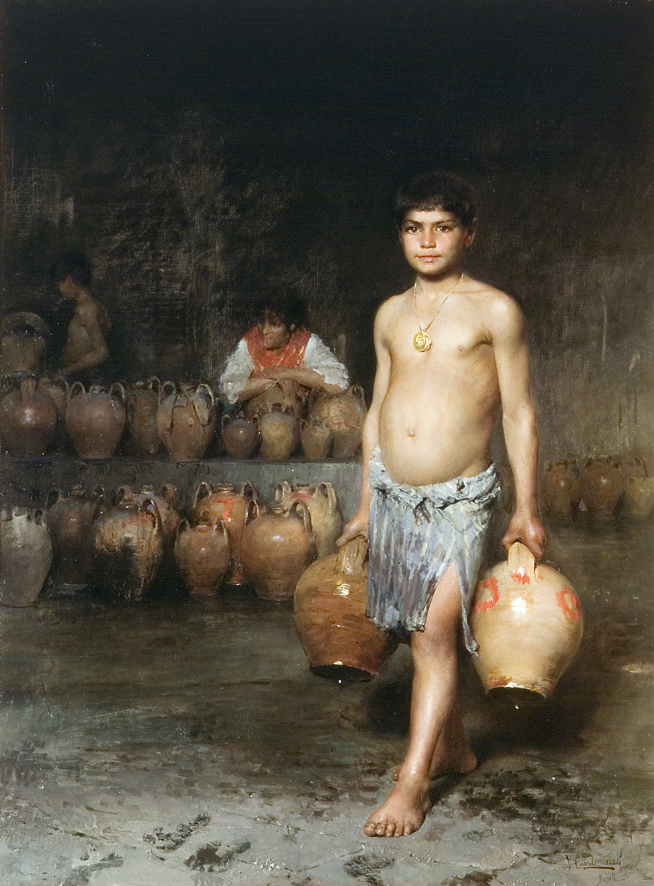
The "Surf" Water of Borgo Santa Lucia
