= Caffè Gambrinus =

Cafè in Naples

Coordinates: 40°50′12.5″N 14°14′54.7″E

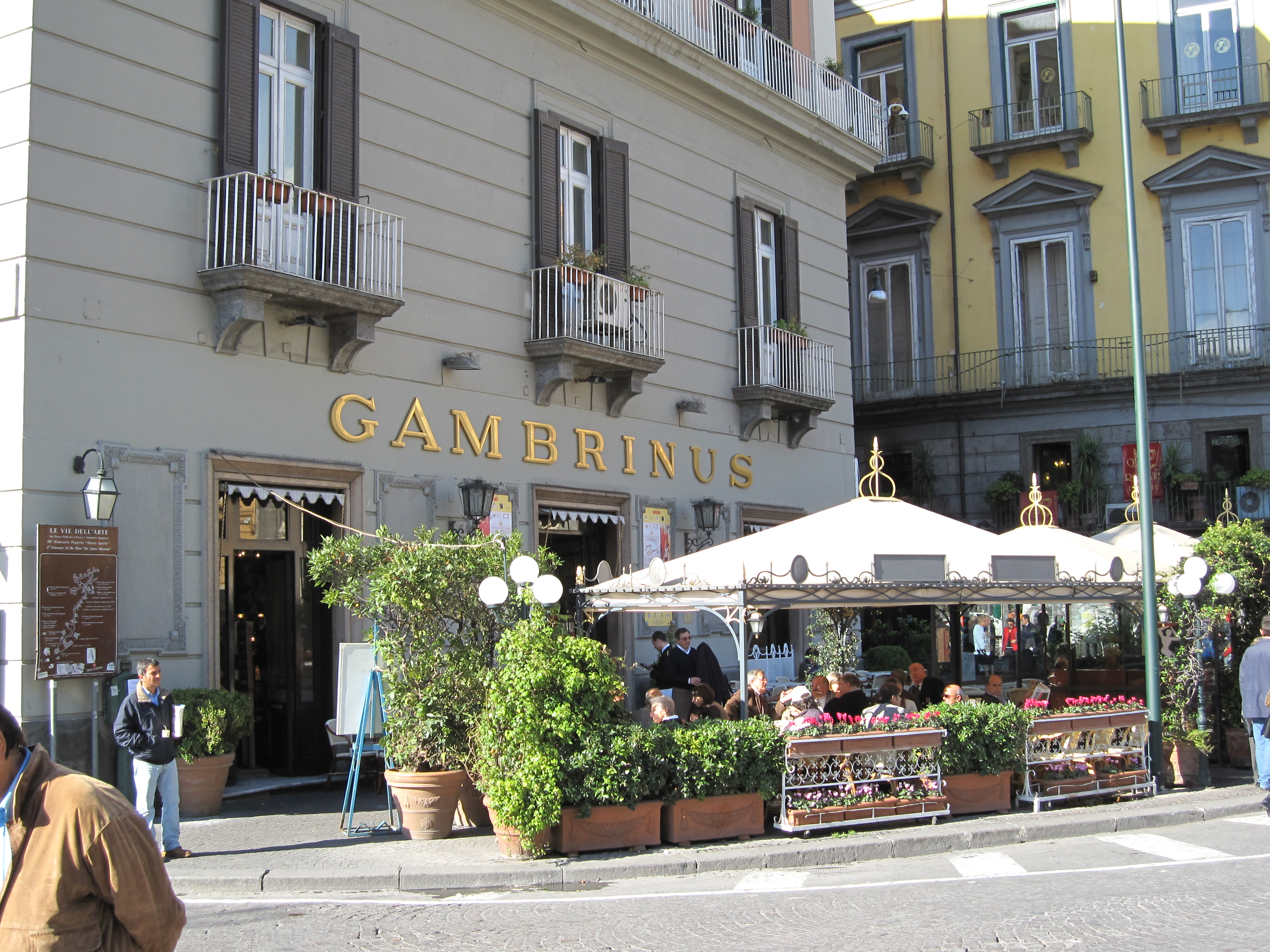
- Facade on via Chiaia
- Type: Coffeehouse
- Founded: 1860
- Headquarters: Via Chiaia, Naples
- Website: grancaffegambrinus.com

The Caffè Gambrinus is a historic private coffeehouse in Central Naples, Italy on via Chiaia. It is located in the rear of the Palazzo della Prefettura, which lies in front and to side of the Royal Palace of Naples, both of which face the Piazza del Plebiscito. The name Gambrinus is a legendary somewhat tipsy figure of joviality, and his name is used for various brands and many establishments.

== History ==
The coffeehouse was founded in 1860 by Vincenzo Apuzzo, whose dream was to make his club the most important of the newborn Italy and he succeeded because he became the official supplier of the Real Casa. The next owner, Mario Vacca, beginning in 1889–1890, commissioned refurbishment and reconstruction using the architect Antonio Curri, and commissioned painted decoration from numerous contemporary artists including Luca Postiglione, Pietro Scoppetta, Vincenzo Volpe, Attilio Pratella, Giuseppe De Sanctis, Giuseppe Casciaro, Gaetano Esposito, Vincenzo Migliaro, Vincenzo Irolli, Eduardo De Filippo and Vincenzo Caprile. Their artwork still graces the elegant Art Nouveau interiors, which evoke the spirit of the Belle Epoque.

The cafe was also known for being a meeting site for intellectuals and artists, including Gabriele D'Annunzio and Filippo Tommaso Marinetti. It was the meeting point of Oscar Wilde, Gabriele D'Annunzio, Ernest Hemingway, Matilde Serao, Princess Sissi, Jean Paul Sartre, Guy de Maupassant, Émile Zola, and Benedetto Croce.

Located near the Teatro di San Carlo, the cafe used to host musicians and orchestra directors before their performances in the main theatre of Naples. On January 1, 2002, the Italian president Carlo Azeglio Ciampi, who was linked to the city by a special empathy, paid his first caffè in euro at the Gambrinus in Naples.

== See also ==
- Coffee
- Coffea
- Neapolitan cuisine
