= Postiglione (surname) =

Postiglione is a surname. Notable people with the surname include:

- Corey Postiglione (born 1942), American artist, art critic and educator
- Francesco Postiglione (born 1972), Italian swimmer and water polo player
- Luca Postiglione (1876–1936), Italian painter
- Raffaele Postiglione (1818-1897), Italian painter
- Salvatore Postiglione (1861–1906), Italian painter
