= Pagliara Art Museum =

Museum in Naples, Italy

- Museo d'arte della fondazione Pagliara
- Location of the art museum in Italy
- Established: 1952
- Location: C.so Vittorio Emanuele, Naples, Italy
- Coordinates: 40°50′27″N 14°14′33″E
- Type: Art museum
- Key holdings: 16th–19th century paintings
- Owner: Suor Orsola Benincasa Institute
- Website: unisob.na.it/ente/b003_b.htm

The Pagliara Art Museum (Italian: Museo d'arte della fondazione Pagliara), also known as the Art Museum of the Pagliara Foundation, is an art museum in Naples, Italy (open by appointment), attached to the Suor Orsola Benincasa Institute, a primary cultural institution in the city.

== History ==
The institution acquired the art collection in 1947, thanks to a donation from the sisters of the late Rocco Pagliara, a Neapolitan writer. In 1952, the museum layout was completed with a series of rooms, furnished with pieces and artworks from the 16th to the 19th century.

== Exhibition ==
The art collection consists of collections of paintings (mostly small-sized) by Italian and foreign painters, sculptures in marble, plaster, and terracotta, furniture, local and European ceramics, engravings, and textiles.

Among the numerous paintings from the 16th, 17th, and 18th centuries, some notable pieces include: The Stigmata of Saint Francis by El Greco, Tobias and the Angel by Claude Lorrain, the Peasant at Rest attributed to Michael Sweerts (a promoter of the bambocciante movement), Madonna of the Rosary and Dominican Saints by Luca Giordano (sketch for the large altarpiece of the Church of the Rosary at the Pigne), Esther and Ahasuerus by Bernardo Cavallino, The Holy Family with Saint John the Baptist attributed to Cesare Fracanzano, Landscape with Figures by French artist Jean-Baptiste Camille Corot, Portrait of Maria Carolina by Angelica Kauffman, George IV and His Admirals by Joshua Reynolds, Portrait of a Lady by Orazio Solimena, Self-Portrait by Paolo De Majo, Bacchanal by Giacomo del Pò, King David by Sebastiano Conca, and Saint Joseph and the Infant Jesus by Giuseppe Bonito.

The presence of works by important Neapolitan and southern Italian artists of the 19th century is also notable, including Domenico Morelli, Paolo Vetri, Eduardo Dalbono, Giuseppe Casciaro, Federico Rossano, Vincenzo Caprile, Edoardo Monteforte, Gaetano Esposito, Giacinto Gigante, Consalvo Carelli (painters), Vincenzo Gemito, Francesco Jerace, Achille D'Orsi, Nicola Renda, and Tommaso Solari (sculptors).

== Bibliography ==
- Caputi, A.; Penta, M. T. (1985). La raccolta d'Arte della Fondazione Pagliara dell'Istituto Suor Orsola Benincasa (in Italian). (a cura di). Napoli.
- Penta, M.T. (1996). Napoli in prospettiva. Vedute della città dal XV al XIX secolo nelle stampe della Raccolta d'Arte Pagliara (in Italian). (a cura di). Napoli.
- L'Europa a Napoli. Rocco Pagliara 1856/1914, mostra e catalogo a cura di M.T. Penta (in Italian). Napoli. 2003.
- Ragione, A. della (2006). La pinacoteca della collezione Pagliara (in Italian). Napoli.
