= Enrico Risi =

Italian painter

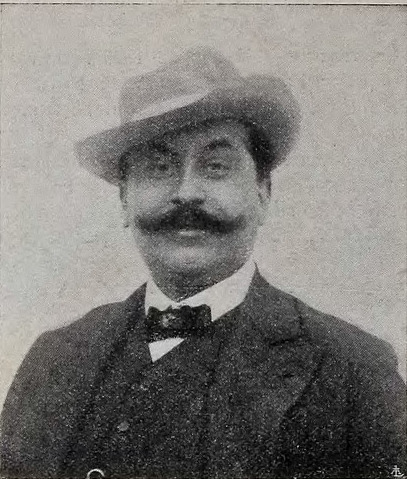
- Born: 23 September 1855; Sant'Elia Fiumerapido
- Died: 3 May 1916 (aged 60)
- Occupation: Painter

Enrico Risi (15 September 1856 – 3 May 1916) was an Italian painter and decorator, active in an Impressionist style.

He was born and died in Sant'Elia Fiumerapido. He painted mainly in Naples, where he restored frescoes for the teatro Mercadante; and decorated the Library of San Pietro a Maiella, the ceilings of Galleria Umberto I, and frescoes for the Palazzo della Borsa, and the waiting room of the Stazione Centrale. He also painted for the churches of Casalucense and Santa Maria la Nova in Sant'Elia.
