= Palazzo della Prefettura, Naples =

Coordinates: 40.8366°N 14.2482°E

Palazzo della Prefettura
- Palazzo della Prefettura
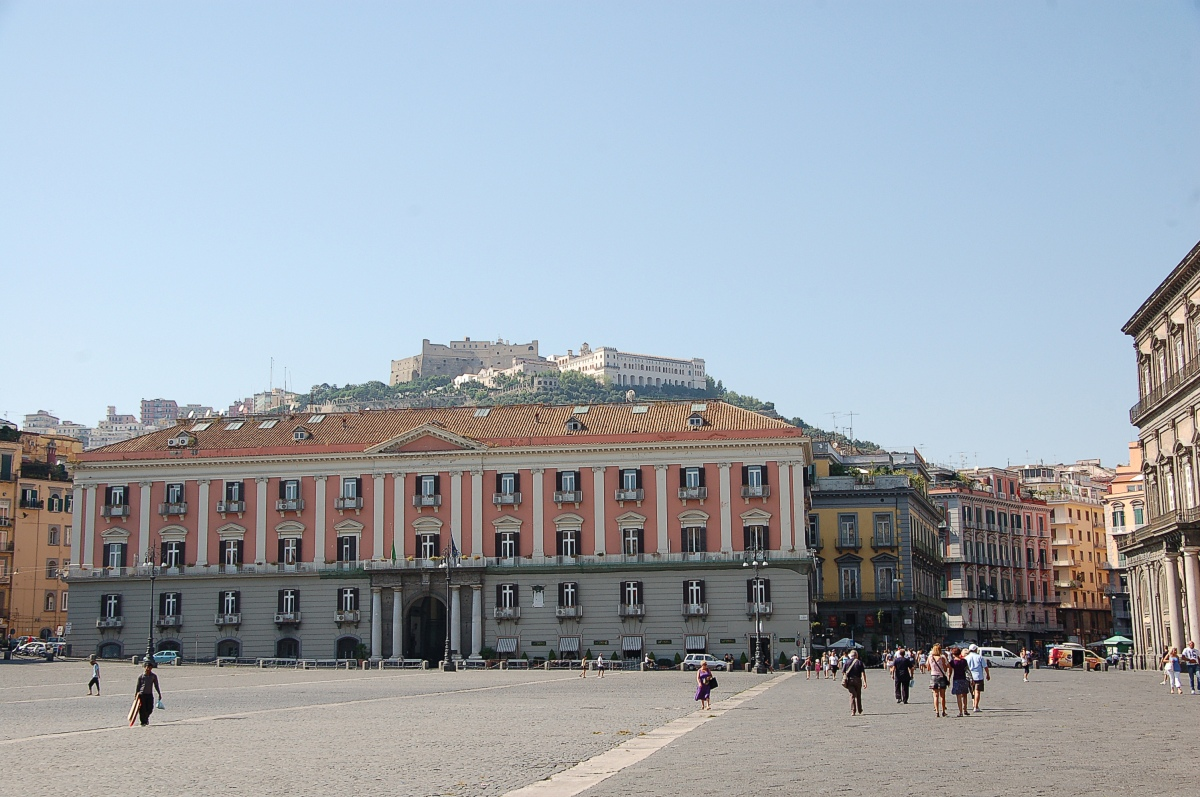
- Palazzo della Prefettura from Piazza del Plebiscito, above in the far hill, the Certosa di San Martino.
- Interactive map of the Palazzo della Prefettura area
- Former names: Palazzo della Foresteria

General information
- Type: Palace
- Architectural style: Neo-Classical
- Location: Naples, Italy, Piazza del Plebiscito 1, 80132 Naples NA, Italy
- Construction started: 1815
- Client: Ferdinand I of the Two Sicilies
- Owner: Kingdom of the Two Sicilies

The Palazzo della Prefettura or Palace of the Prefecture is a monumental palace located in the central Piazza del Plebiscito in Naples, Italy. It stands in front and to the north of the Royal Palace.

== History ==
The palace previously called Palazzo della Foresteria, was commissioned by Ferdinand I of the Two Sicilies as a guest house in the gardens of his royal palace. It had previously housed a 14th-century convent of Basilian Monks. The present Neoclassical building and its twin across the piazza were designed by the 19th century architects Leopoldo Laperuta and Antonio De Simone. In 1890 Antonio Curri decorated the first floor Caffè Gambrinus, noted in the 19th century for attracting artists.
