= Piazza del Plebiscito =

Public square in Naples, Italy

- Public Square
- {{{other_names}}}
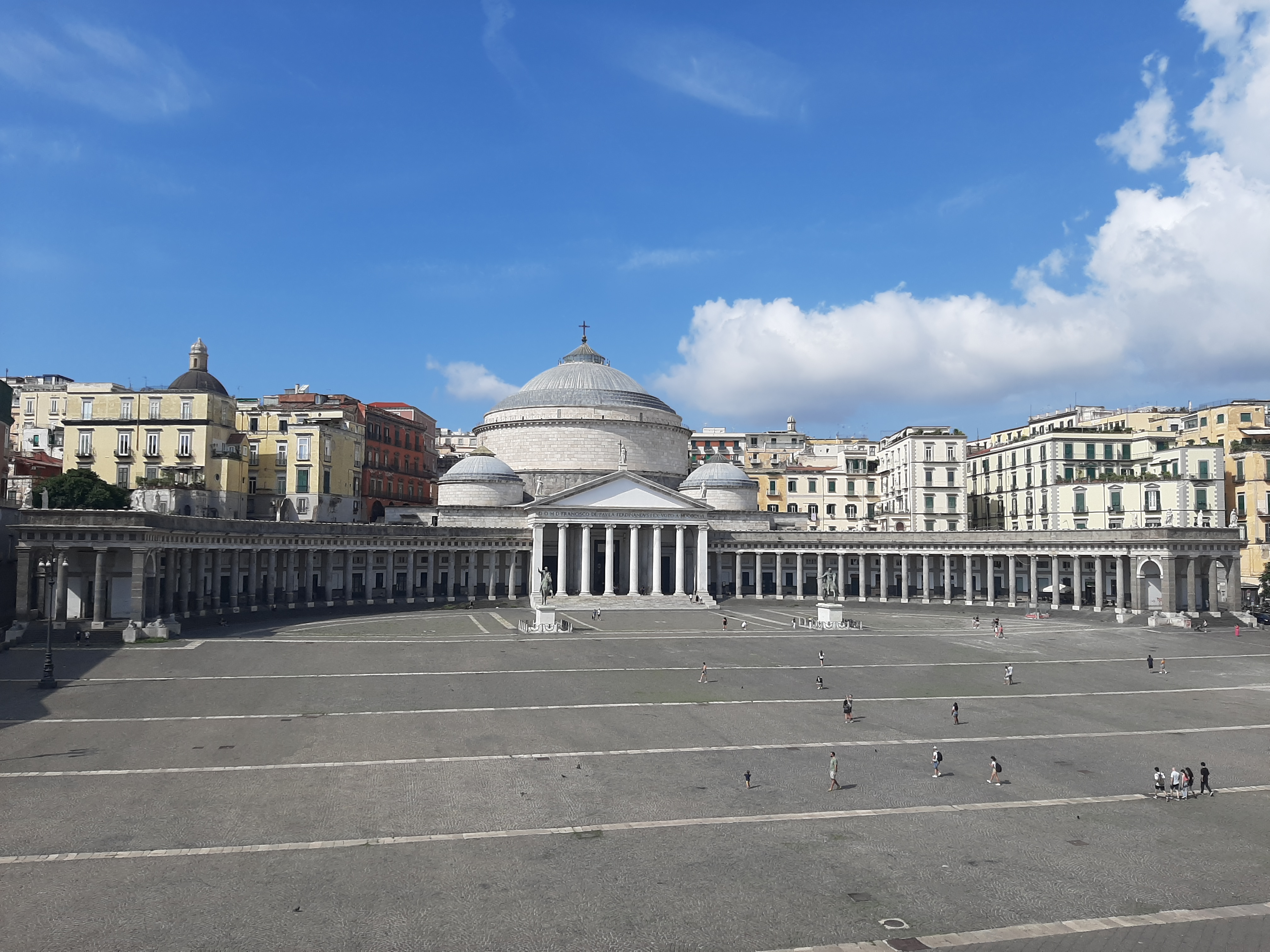
- View of Piazza del Plebiscito
- Design: Leopoldo Laperuta, Antonio de Simone
- Constructed: 1809–1846
- Opened: 1846
- Area: 25.000 m^{2} (269.10 sq ft)
- Surface: Vesuvian Volcanic Rock
- Dedicated to: Plebiscite of 21 October 1860
- Location: Naples, Italy
- Interactive map of Piazza del Plebiscito
- Coordinates: 40°50′11″N 14°14′53″E

Piazza del Plebiscito (Italian pronunciation: [ˈpjattsa del plebiʃˈʃiːto]; Neapolitan: Chiazza d''o Plebbiscito) is a large public square in central Naples, Italy.

== History ==
Named after the plebiscite taken on October 21, 1860, that brought Naples into the unified Kingdom of Italy under the House of Savoy, the piazza is very close to the gulf of Naples and bounded by the Royal Palace (east) and the church of San Francesco di Paola (west) with its hallmark twin colonnades extending to each side. Other noted adjacent buildings include the Palazzo Salerno and, its mirror, the Prefecture Palace (on the left arm of the church).

In the first years of the 19th century, the King of Naples, Murat (Napoleon's brother-in-law), planned the square and building as a tribute to the emperor. Soon after Napoleon was finally dispatched to St Helena, the Bourbons were restored to the throne, and Ferdinand I continued the construction but converted the finished product into the church one sees today. He dedicated it to Saint Francis of Paola, who had stayed in a monastery on this site in the 15th century. The church is reminiscent of the Pantheon in Rome. The façade is fronted by a portico resting on six columns and two Ionic pillars. Inside, the church is circular with two side chapels. The dome is 53 metres high.

In 1963, a municipal ordinance transformed the square into a public parking lot to cope with the uncontrolled increase of cars in the city. The square was thus disfigured (among other things, in addition to the car park there was also an extensive parking area for public transport buses close to the roadway, and even welcomed a large yard for the construction of the Rapid Tramway towards the end of the eighties) until in 1994, on the occasion of the G7 summit, the square was renovated, first replacing the asphalt of the roadway behind the Royal Palace with the more traditional paving stones, and then pedestrianizing it in its entirety.

Occasionally, the square is used for open-air concerts. Artists who have performed here include popular Italian and Neapolitan artists, such as Franco Battiato and Pino Daniele, as well as international stars including Elton John, Maroon 5 and Muse. In May 2013, Bruce Springsteen & The E-Street Band gave a concert at the venue.

== Gallery ==
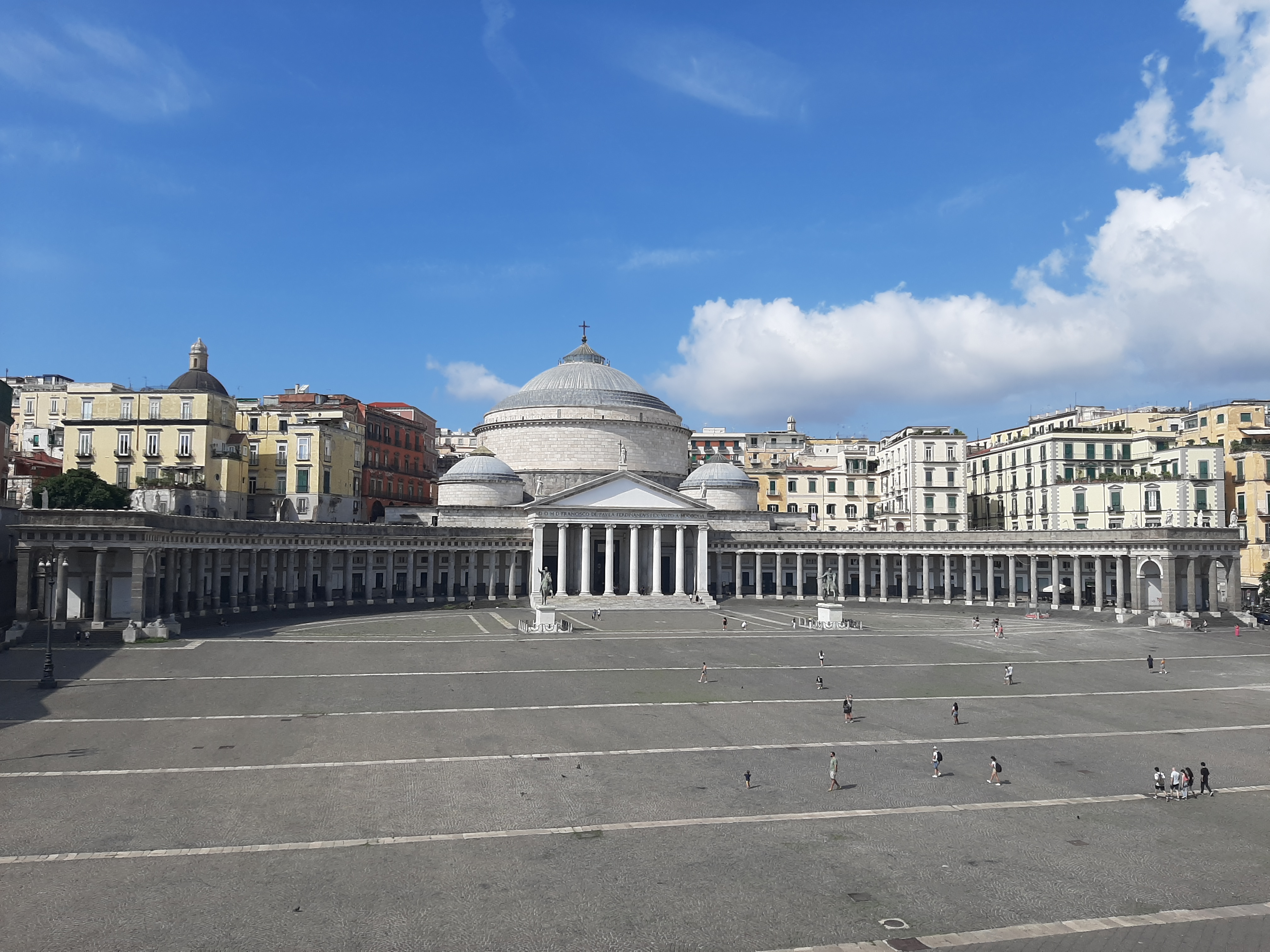
Piazza del Plebiscito seen from Royal Palace of Naples

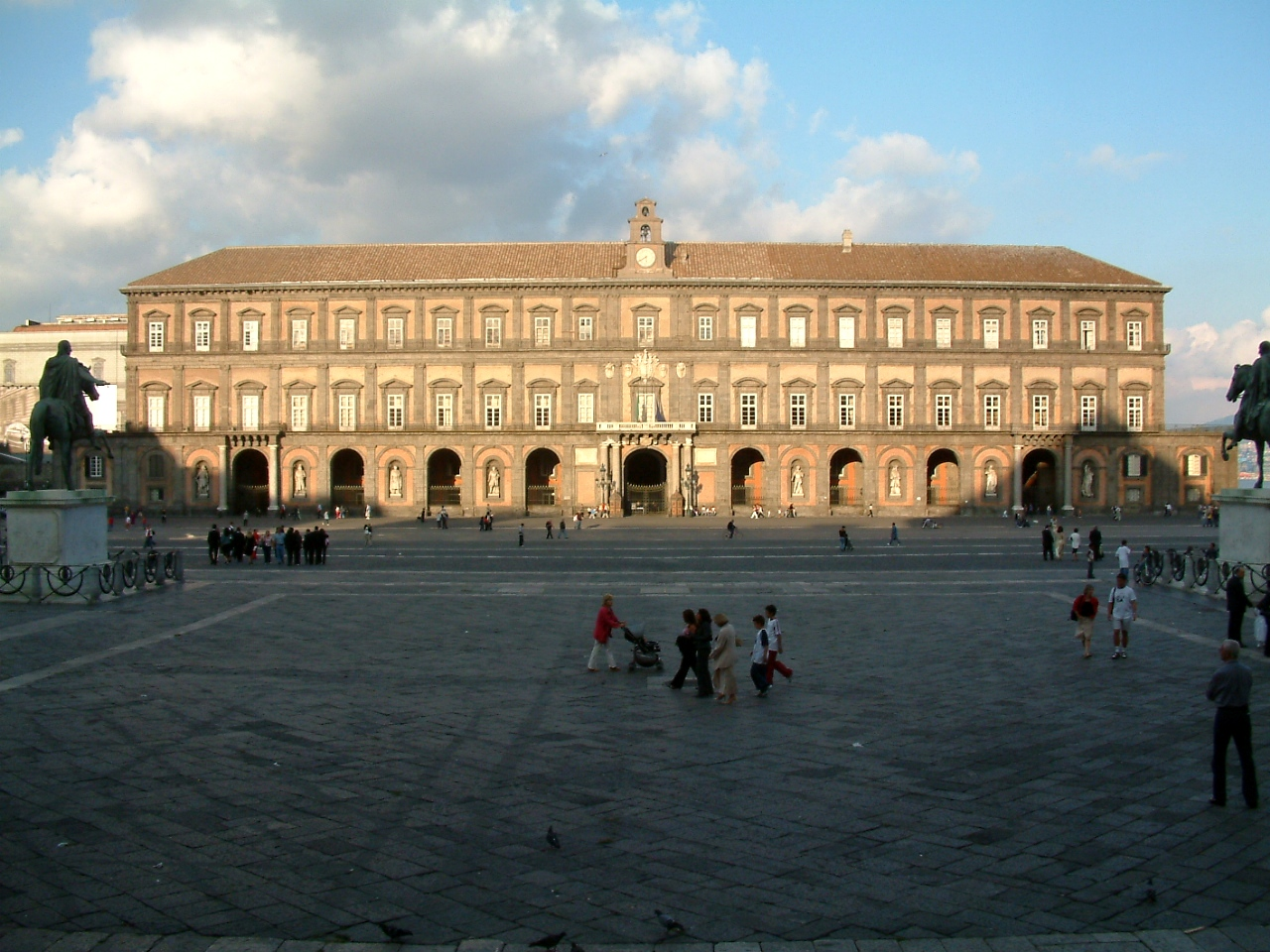
Piazza del Plebiscito with Royal Palace

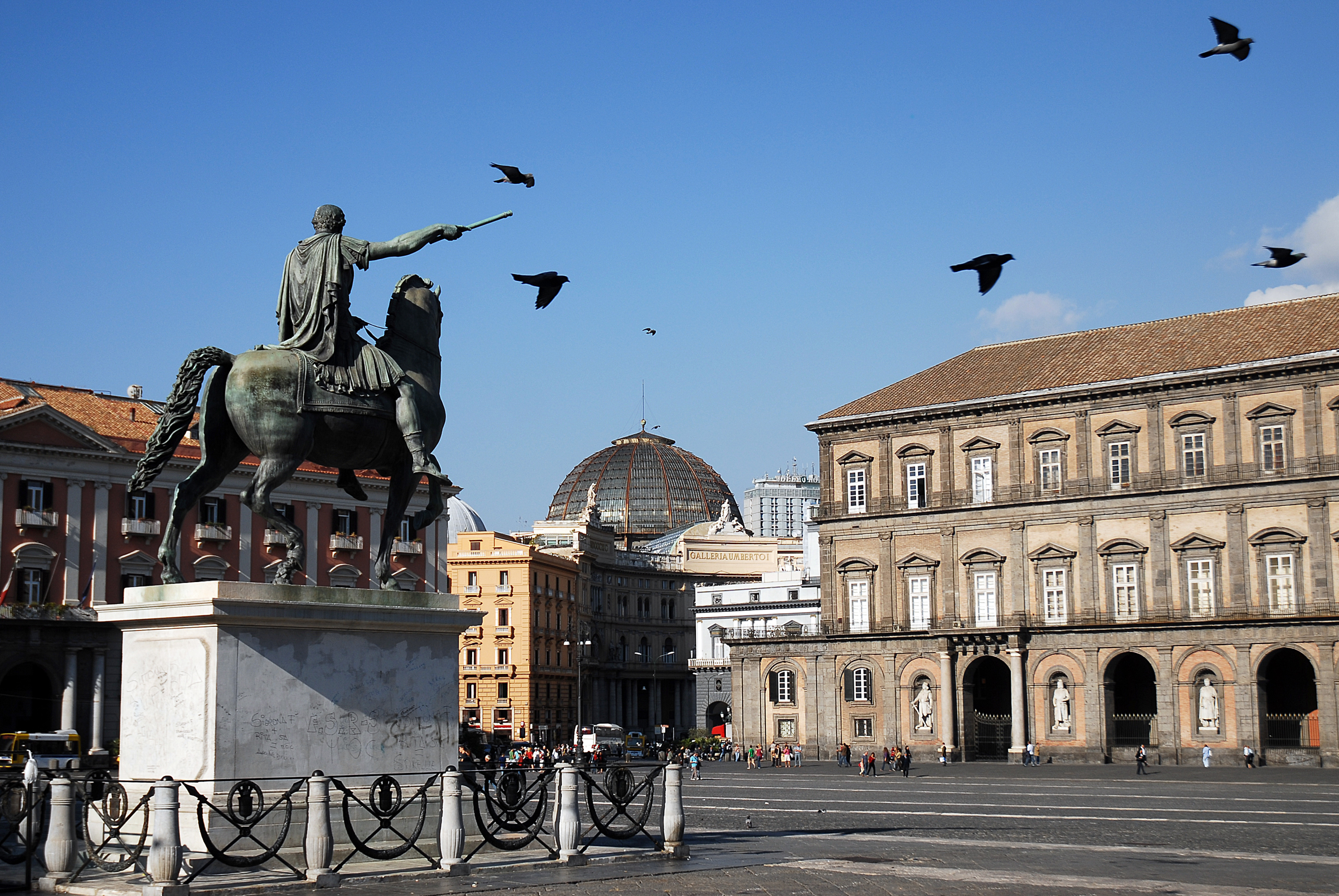
Piazza del Plebiscito, monument to Charles VII of Naples (later Charles III of Spain) in foreground and the cupola of the Galleria Umberto I in background. Naples, Italy.
