= Gustavo Mancinelli =

Italian painter

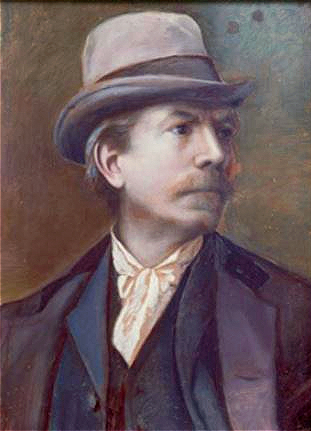
Self-portrait (date unknown)

Gustavo Mancinelli (1842 – 12 April 1906) was an Italian painter in several genres; including landscapes, historical scenes, and portraits.

== Biography ==
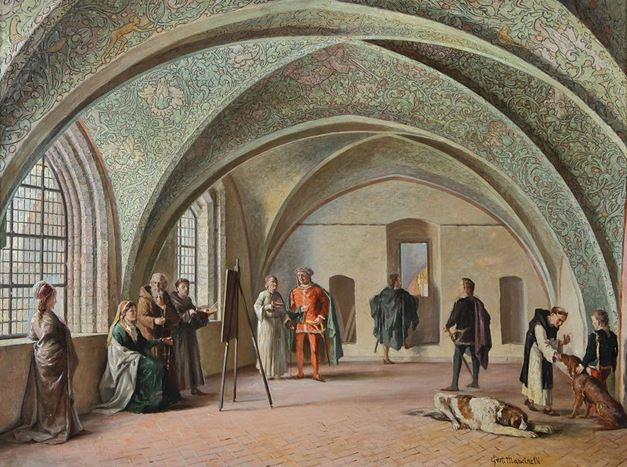
Life at the Court

Mancinelli was born in Rome, Italy. He was the eldest of seven children born to the painter, Giuseppe Mancinelli, and his wife, Maddalena née Arnoldi. His father began teaching him to paint when he was still very young. His first showing was at the Bourbon Exhibition of 1855, in Naples, when he was only thirteen years old, and he was awarded a silver medal. In 1859, he was awarded a gold medal for his depiction of a communion in the catacombs.

His first exhibition at the Society for the Promotion of Fine Arts was held in 1864. He would continue to exhibit with them regularly until 1884. During those years, he created several works in the Orientalist genre, most of which were judged very harshly. Some historical scenes were purchased by the province of Naples. In the late seventies, he began to exhibit more widely; in Rome, Milan and Turin, including Rome's International Art Exhibition of 1883, where he presented a portrait of Queen Margherita of Savoy.

In 1891, in addition to his paintings, he did work at the Teatro Politeama, Palermo. This included a curtain, depicting Aeschylus at the court of ancient Syracuse, and decorations with scenes from the Eleutheria. Four years later, he worked at the Teatro Comunale in Syracuse, decorating the vault of the dome with Daphne, in a forest populated by Nymphs. From 1897 to 1898, he was one of the artists who created frescoes for the trading hall at the new Naples Stock Exchange building.

He also painted a few altarpieces, including one for the chapel of Saint Augustine in the church of Santa Maria di Piedigrotta.

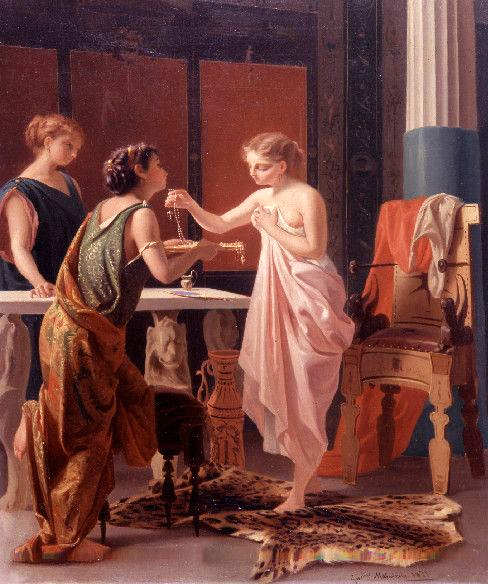
A Pompeiian Girl
