= Giacomo Di Chirico =

Italian painter (1844–1883)

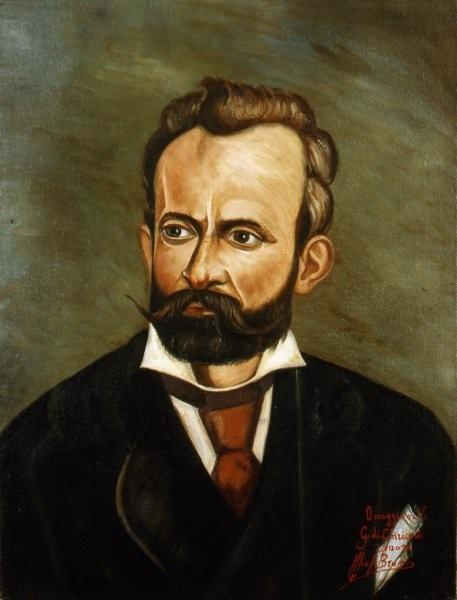
- self portrait
- Born: 27 January 1844; Venosa, Basilicata
- Died: 26 December 1883 (aged 39); Naples, Campania
- Known for: painting

Giacomo Ernesto Eduardo Di Chirico (27 January 1844 – 26 December 1883) was an Italian painter. Together with Domenico Morelli and Filippo Palizzi, he was one of the most elite Neapolitan artists of the 19th century.

== Biography ==
Giacomo Di Chirico was born in Venosa into a carpenter's family, the younger son of Luigi and Caterina Savino. In 1847, when Di Chirico was barely 3 years old, his father Luigi died, leaving the family impoverished. He attended a private school for boys from deprived families under the supervision of priest Giuseppe Gianturco, the brother of politician Emanuele Gianturco. He began working at a barbershop to support his family economically but had become passionate about his painting hobby, after learning basic art techniques from his older brother, Nicola, a sculptor.

Di Chirico had begun to create portraits of his customers, who expressed admiration for his work, and local citizens who saw his portraits began to request them. Feeling stimulated from such interest and their appreciation, Di Chirico decided to become a professional painter. He obtained a subsidy salary from the municipality of Venosa, was enrolled in the Academy of Fine Arts of Naples and graduated after he had demonstrated optimal results from the studies.

In 1865, Di Chirico became a disciple of Francesco de Sanctis, who taught him lessons in literature for two years.

Between 1868 and 1871, Di Chirico refined his artistic technique while living in Rome, further strengthening his friendship with Domenico Morelli and Filippo Palizzi. He returned to Naples to open an art studio.

During his career, Di Chirico created masterpieces such as Buoso da Duera, Quinto Orazio Flacco, Corteggiamento and Donna lucana. Sposalizio in Basilicata, one of his best known paintings, was exhibited in Paris (1877), Vienna (1879) and Munich (1882). It was purchased by the French merchant Adolphe Goupil. Di Chirico's works were exposed at the Goupil & Cie in Paris. He received the title Knight of the Order of the Crown of Italy from Victor Emmanuel II.

Between 1877 and 1878, Di Chirico was made an honorary professor at the Academy of Art in Naples. He spent August (Ferragosto) in Maiori, where he met his wife Emilia D’Amato. He remained with her for the rest of his life and they had a daughter named Maria. One of his pupils was Pietro Scoppetta.

As his artistic career continued to reach new heights, so did the rise of his activity until 1882, when Di Chirico began to exhibit symptoms of mania, sleep deprivation and cachexia, a pattern of ailments that overlapped with the Dutch painter Vincent van Gogh's illness. Di Chirico was confined to the Provincial lunatic asylum for his mental illness. In the asylum, his physical health continued to deteriorate, and he died during treatment in Naples in 1883 at age 39.

== Artworks ==
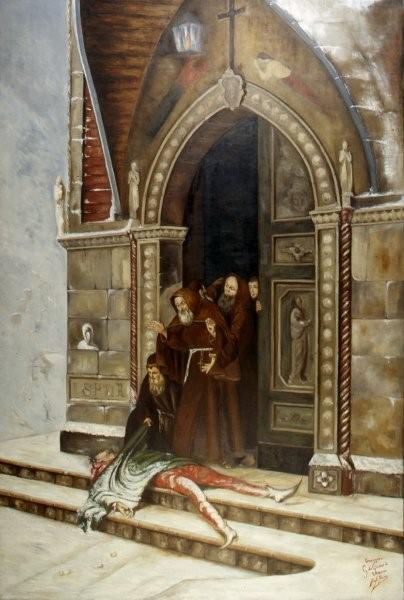
Buoso da Duera

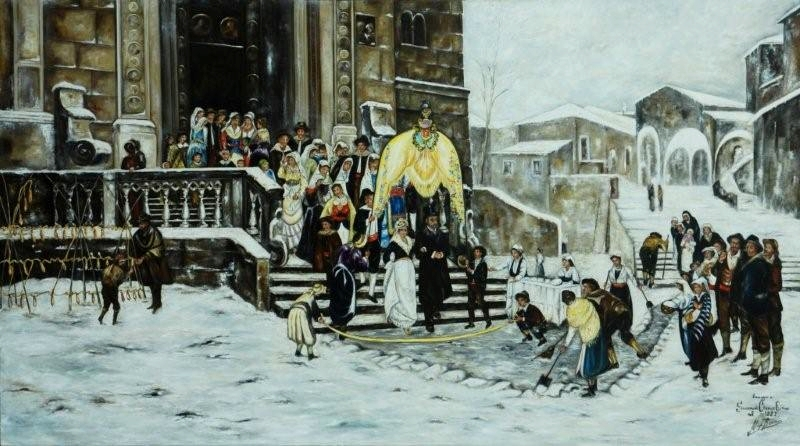
Sposalizio in Basilicata

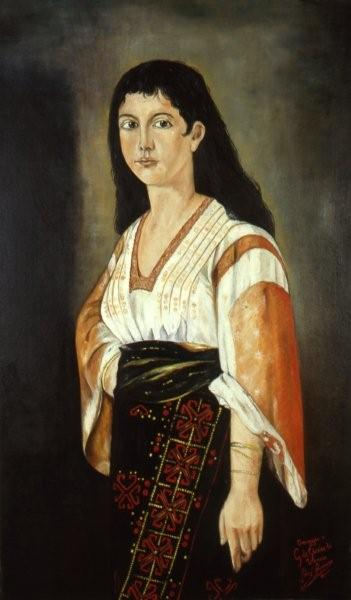
Donna lucana

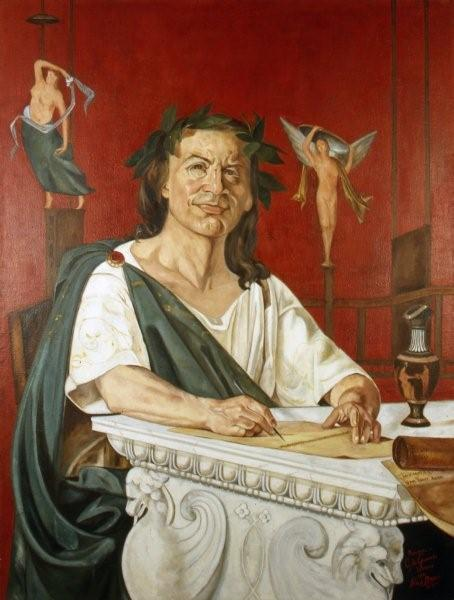
Horace

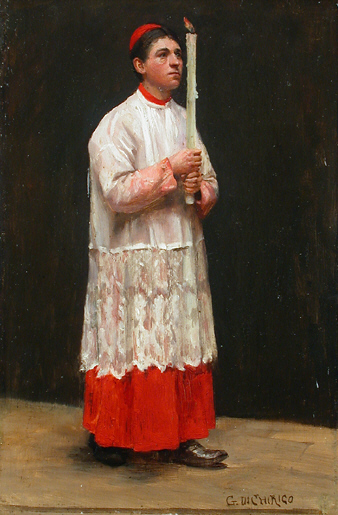
Il ministrante

== Honor ==
- • Knight of the Order of the Crown of Italy, Kingdom of Italy

== Bibliography ==
- Richard Muther, The history of modern painting, Volume 3, J.M. Dent & Co., 1907.
- Enrico Castelnuovo, La Pittura in Italia: l'Ottocento, Volume 2, Electa, 1991.
