= Vincenzo Migliaro =

Italian painter (1858–1938)

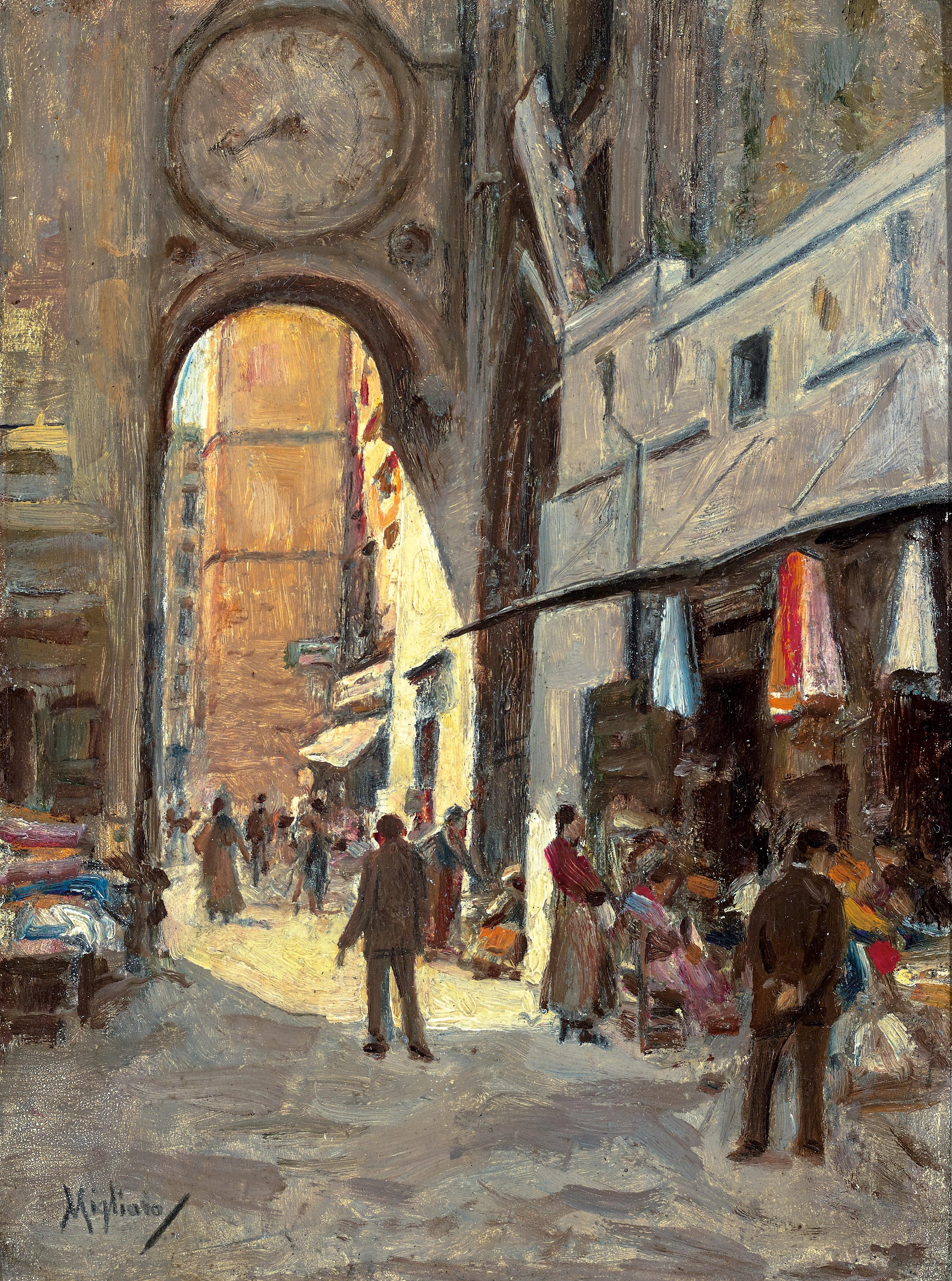
Arch of Sant'Eligio

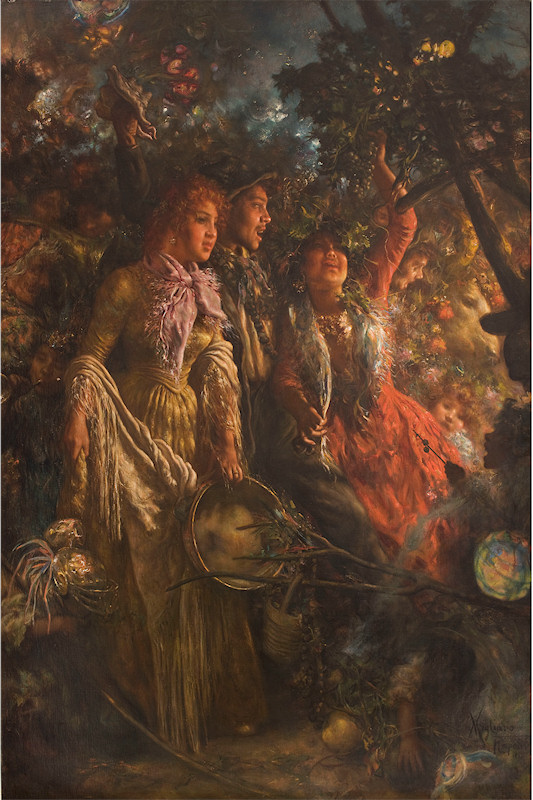
Episodio di genere o La vendemmia (Fondazione Cariplo)

Vincenzo Migliaro (1858–1938) was an Italian painter born in Naples.

== Biography ==
After learning the art of wood carving at courses held by the Società Centrale Operaia Napoletana and working in the studio of Stanislao Lista, Migliaro enrolled in 1875 at the Naples Institute of Fine Arts, where his masters included Domenico Morelli. While a short trip to Paris in 1877 afforded him the opportunity to study the works exhibited in the Louvre, the artist's main source of inspiration was Naples and its highly animated everyday life. The works he presented in exhibitions at the national and international level – including Turin (1880, 1884, and 1898) and Barcelona (1911), where he won a silver medal – gained him a reputation as a keen observer of Neapolitan life. Involved in the decoration of the Caffè Gambrinus in the following decade together with Vincenzo Irolli and other painters, he took part in the Venice Biennale from 1901 to 1928 and exhibited alongside Vincenzo Caprile and Vincenzo Gemito, both Neapolitans, at the Galleria Pesaro, Milan, in 1927.

== Other projects ==
- Portrait of Migliaro by Gaetano Esposito

Media related to Vincenzo Migliaro at Wikimedia Commons
