= Palazzo della Borsa, Naples =

Palace in Italy

Coordinates: 40.8442°N 14.2554°E

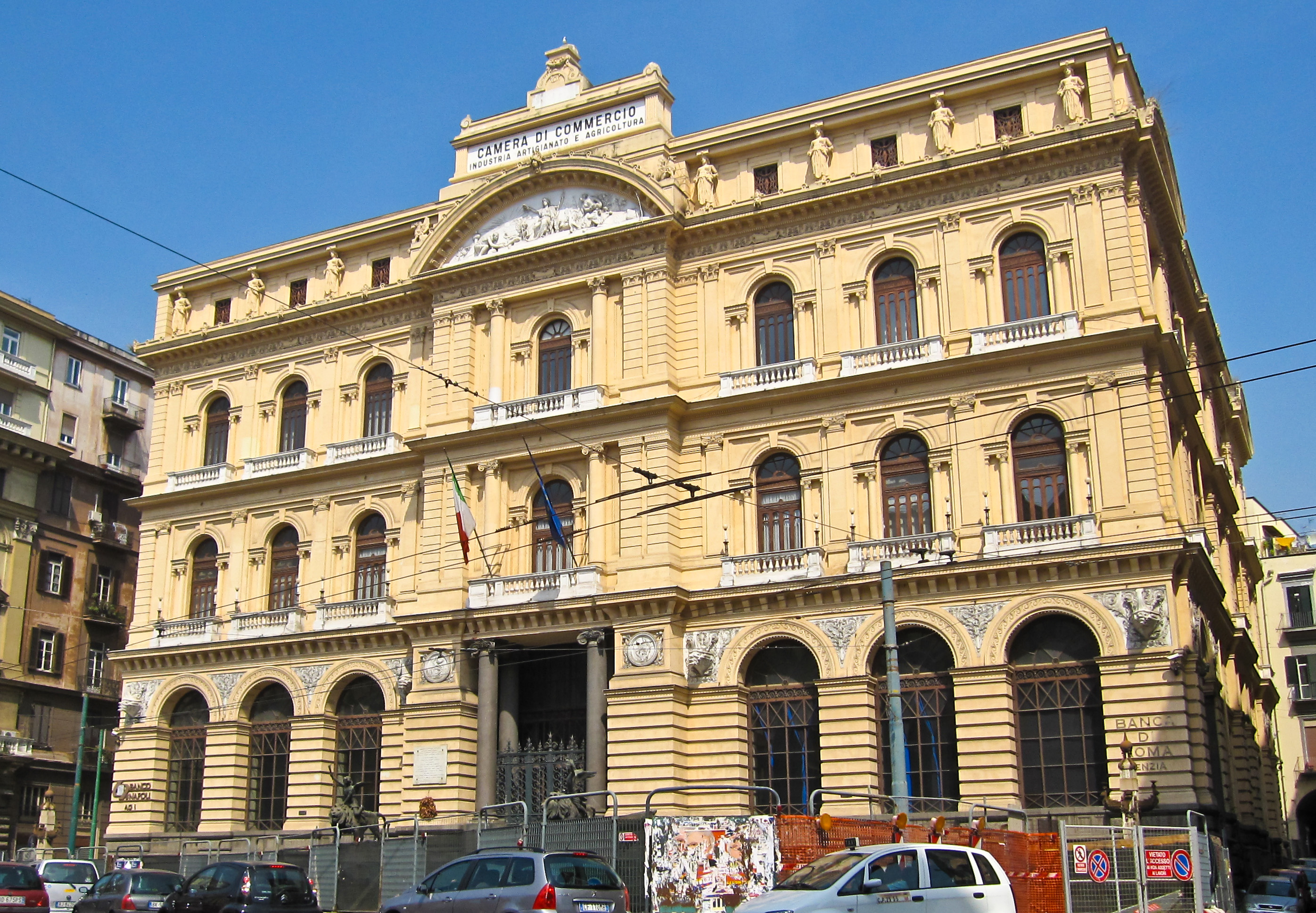
Palace front

The Palazzo della Borsa is a monumental 19th-century palace located in the Piazza of the same name in Naples, region of Campania, Italy. The building, built in an academic and elaborate Neo-renaissance style formerly housed the local stock exchange (Bourse), but now home to the Neapolitan Chamber of Commerce.

== History ==
The palace was designed in 1895 by Alfonso Guerra and Luigi Ferrara. Flanking the front steps are two winged genii carrying torches and riding bronze lions. This sculpture by Luigi De Luca was meant as an allegory of the light of reason taming wild force. The main salon has frescoed lunettes by Gustavo Mancinelli, Gaetano Esposito, Vincenzo Migliaro, Alceste Campriani, Salvatore Postiglione, Salvatore Cozzolino, Gaetano d’Agostino, and Giovanni Diana. This salon has stuccoes by Ciro Sannino and Vincenzo Belligiono. In the first floor is a statue by Giuseppe del Fico.

The piazza in front, once known as the Piazza della Borsa is now known as Piazza Giovanni Bovio. In the center of the Piazza is now an equestrian statue of Vittorio Emmanuele II. The Piazza for most of the 20th century housed the 16th century Fountain of Neptune. During the Mussolini period, the two stunted flanking obelisks with ancient ship hulls (rostra) were added. A plaque in the entrance recalls four who died resisting against the German occupiers during the Four days of Naples in 1943

== Gallery ==
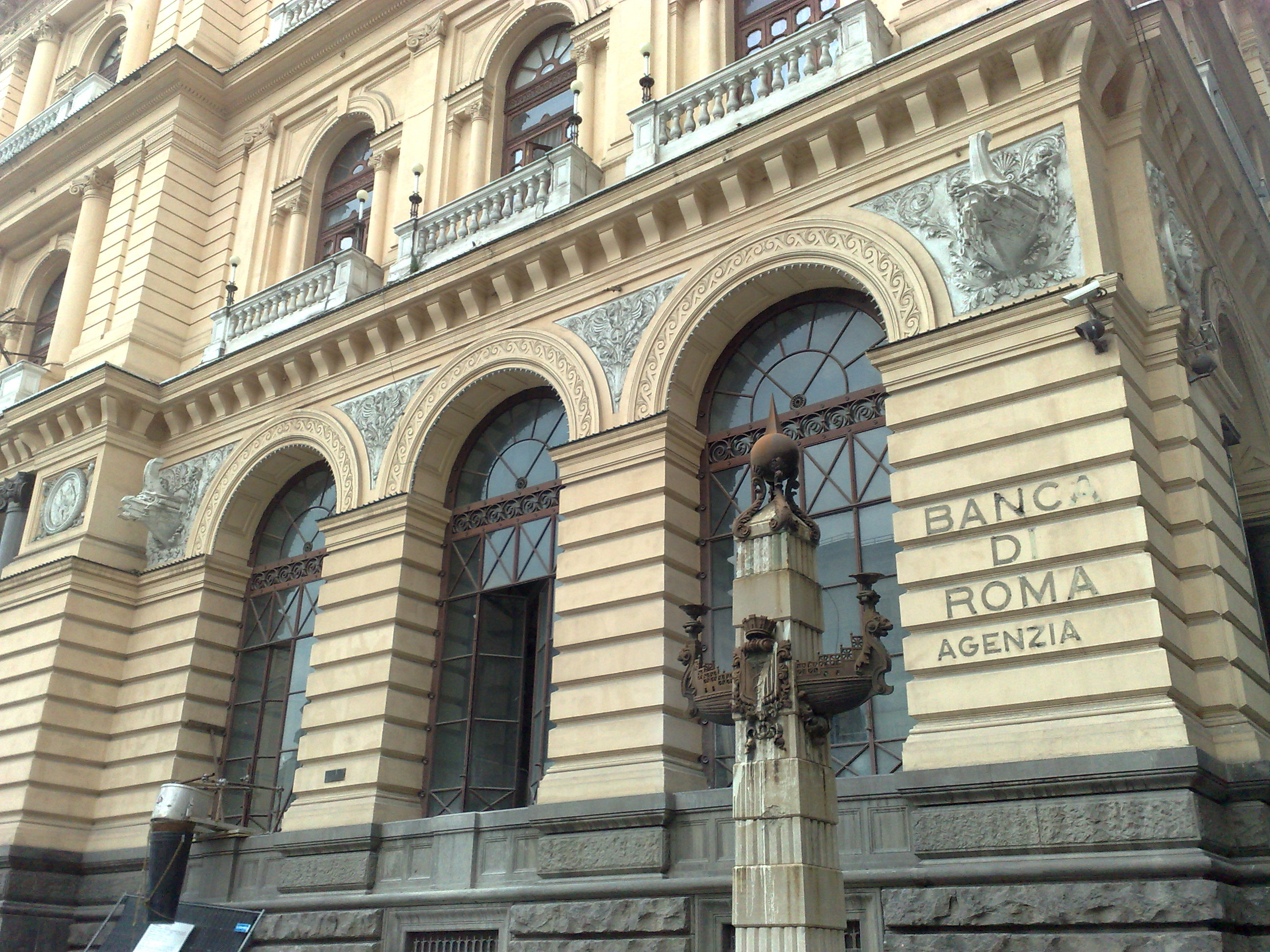
Obelisks in front of palace

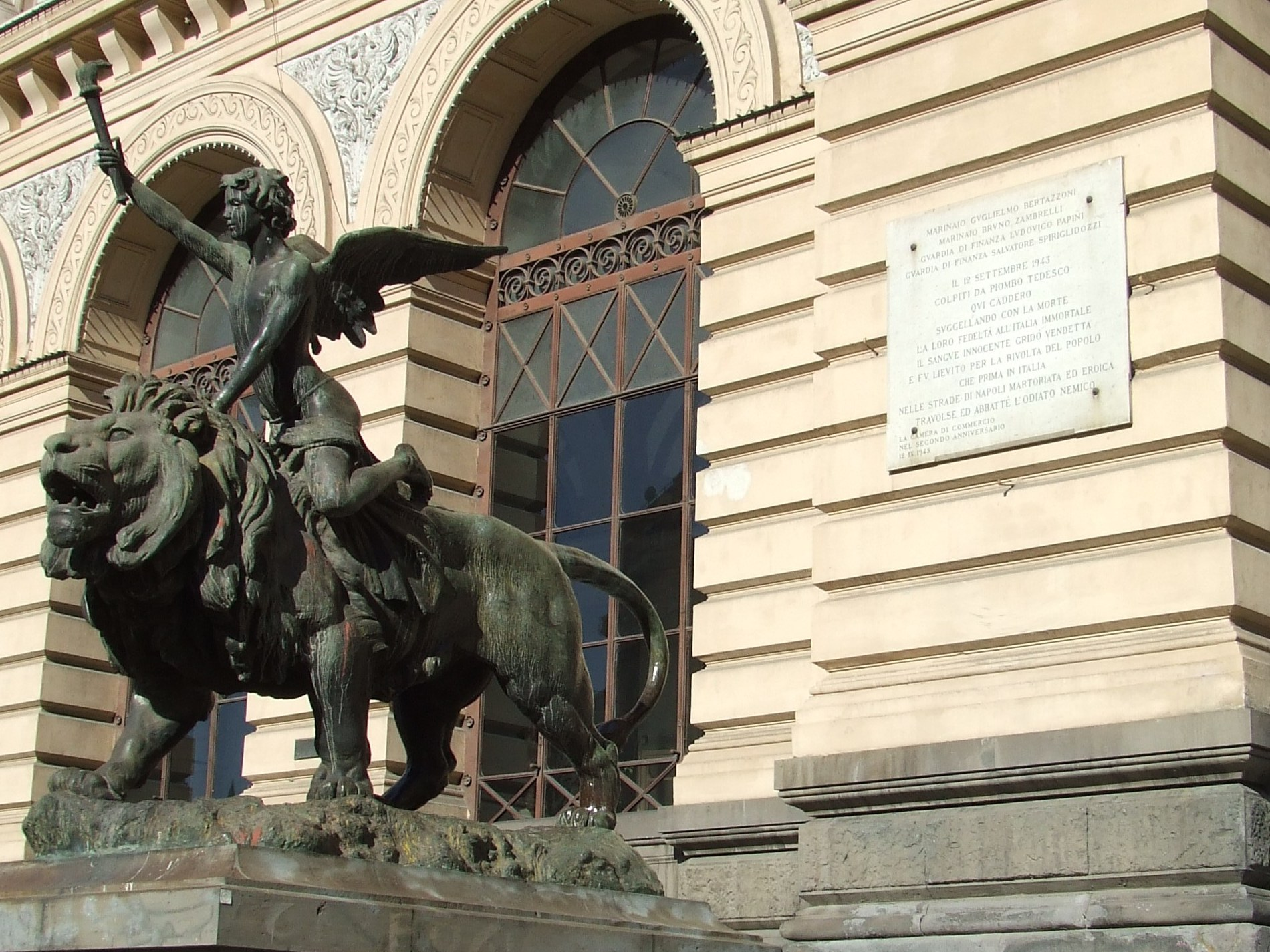
Entrance Lion and Genii statues

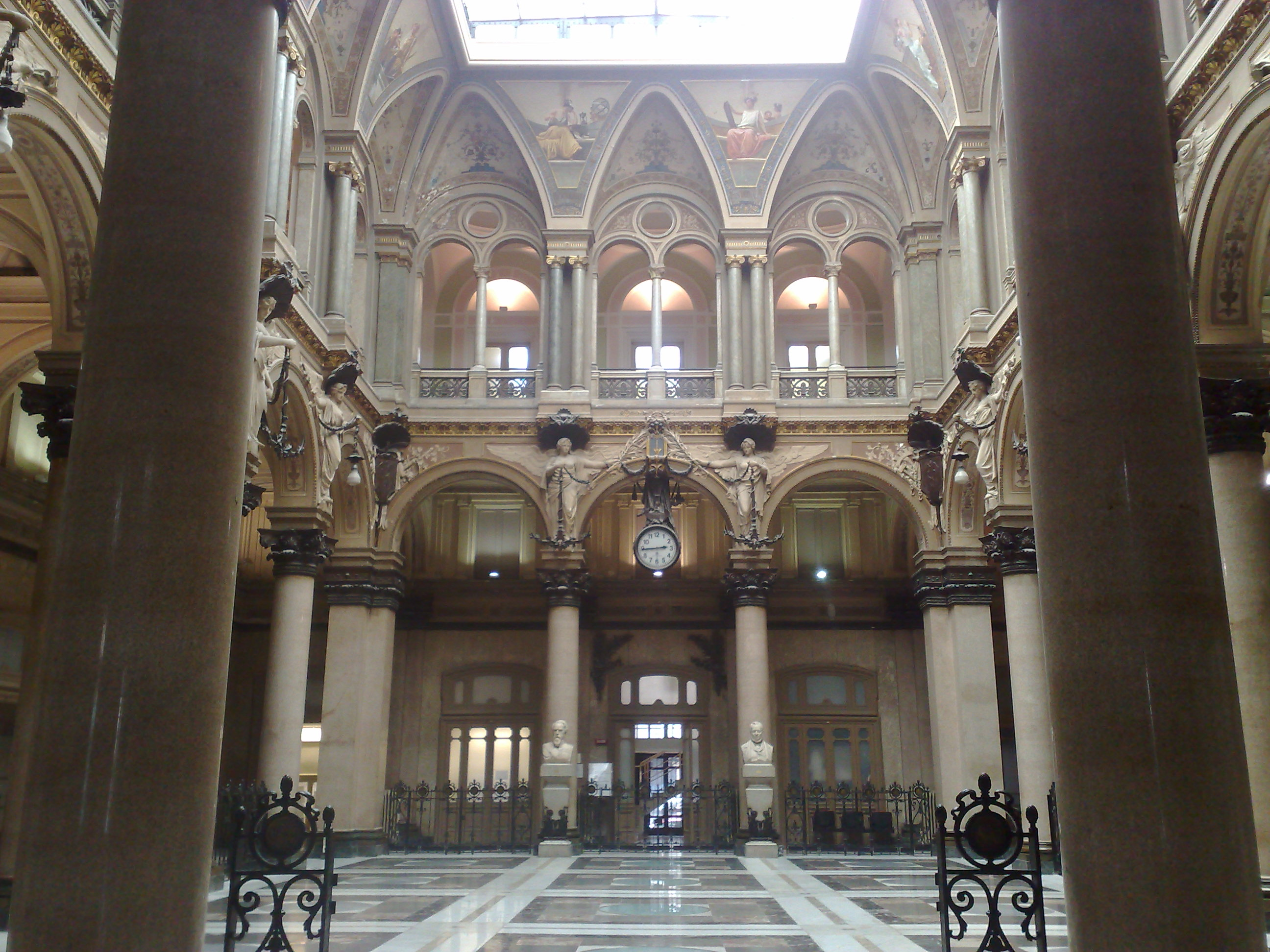
Interior atrium or sala delle Grida
