= Vincenzo Irolli =

Italian painter (1860–1949)

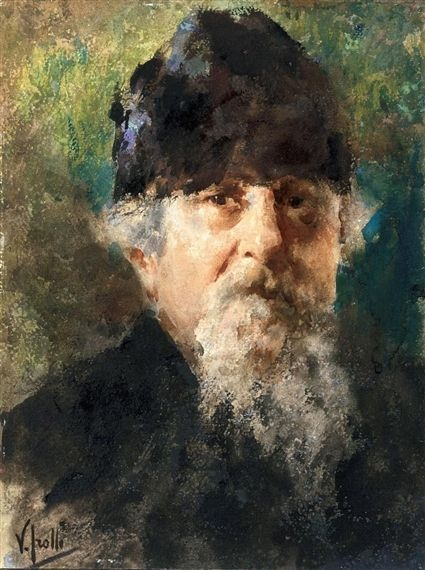
- Self portrait
- Born: September 30, 1860; Naples, Italy
- Died: November 27, 1949 (aged 89)

Vincenzo Irolli (30 September 1860 – 27 November 1949) was an Italian painter.

== Biography ==
Vincenzo Irolli was born in Naples, then in the Kingdom of the Two Sicilies. He enrolled in the Naples Institute of Fine Arts, where his masters included Gioacchino Toma, in 1877 and graduated three years later. The work he presented regularly at the exhibitions of the Naples Società Promotrice di Belle Arti as from 1879 comprised portraits and genre scenes. In 1884 in Turin, he exhibited Amore e dovere and Le Maddalene d' oggi; in 1880 in Milan and in 1887 in Venice, he exhibited numerous drawings from reality.

He became a member of the Circolo Artistico Napoletano in 1890 and worked with Vincenzo Migliaro and other local artists on decorations for the Caffè Gambrinus at the end of the decade. A regular participant in major national events, he also presented work at the Salon in Paris, where he won great success, and at international exhibitions, including London (1904), Munich (1909) and Barcelona (1911), where he was awarded a bronze medal. Alongside intense maternal figures, portraits of children and colorful scenes of everyday life, he also depicted religious subjects, as in the ten works presented at the Mostra di Arte Sacra of 1936 in Naples.

== Gallery ==
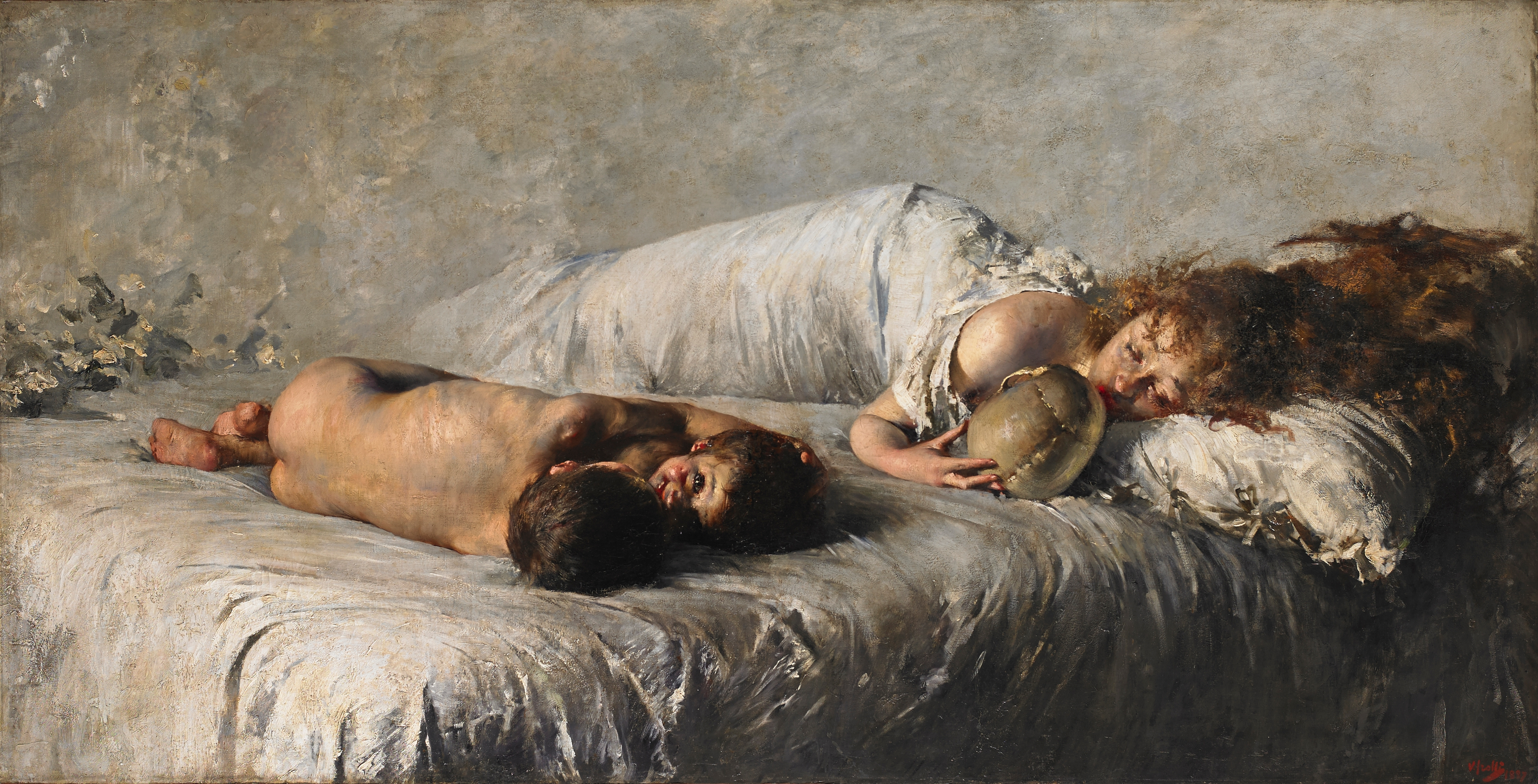
Afternoon (c. 1887)

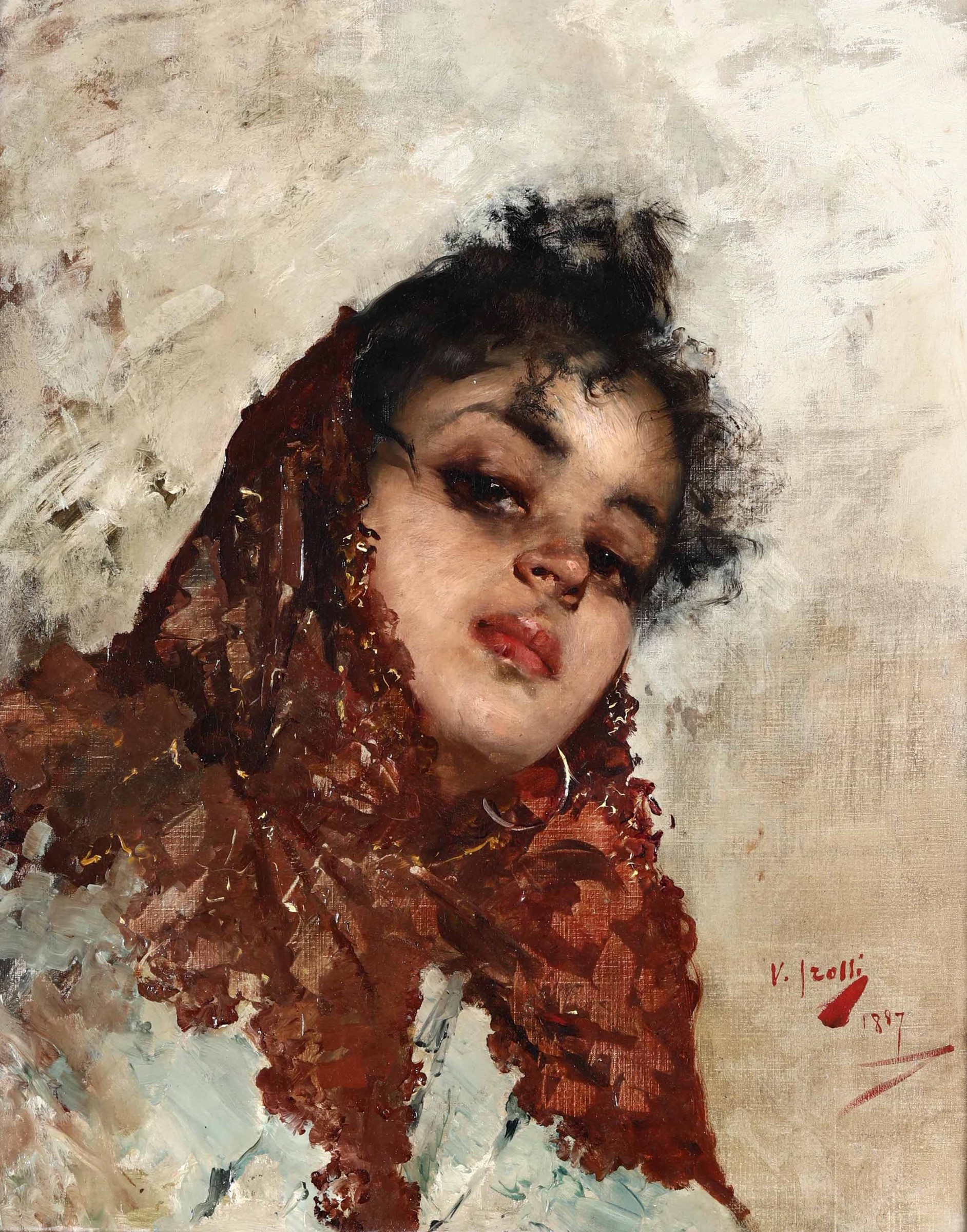
Portrait of a Young Girl (c. 1887)

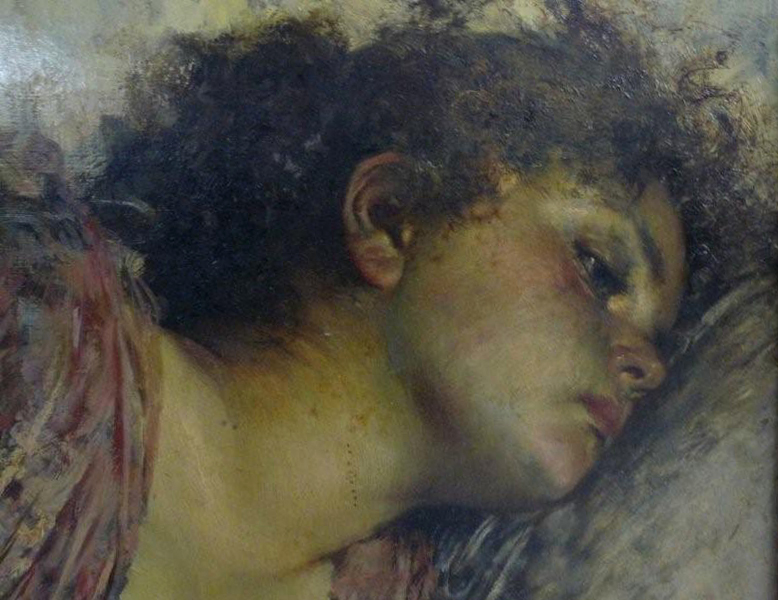

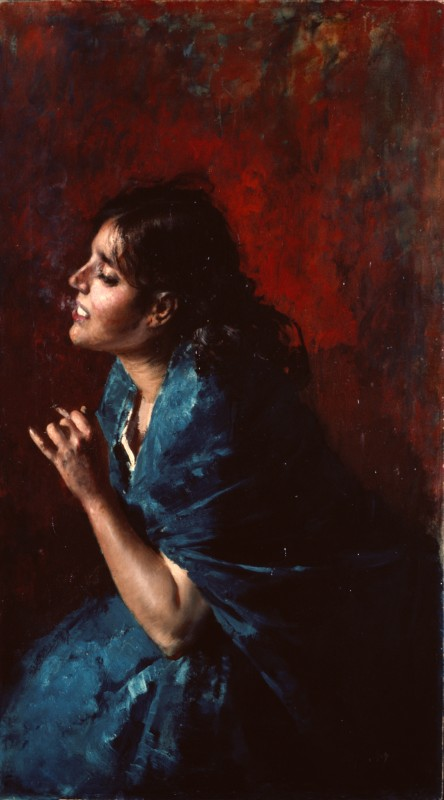
Voluttà (c. 1900; Fondazione Cariplo)

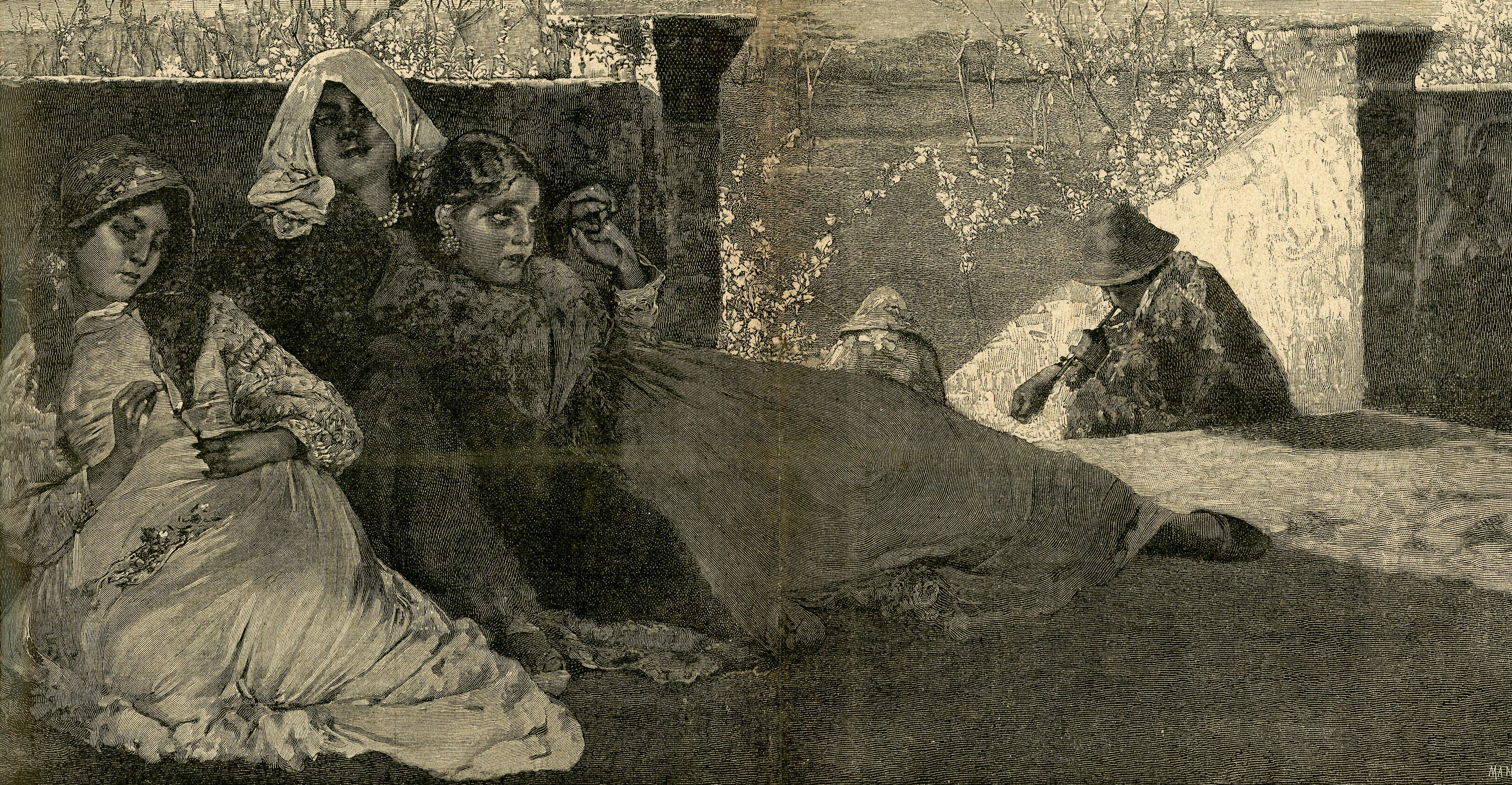
Spring

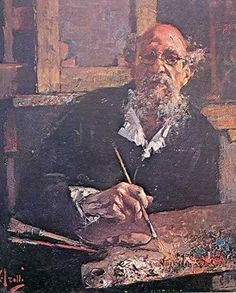
Self portrait

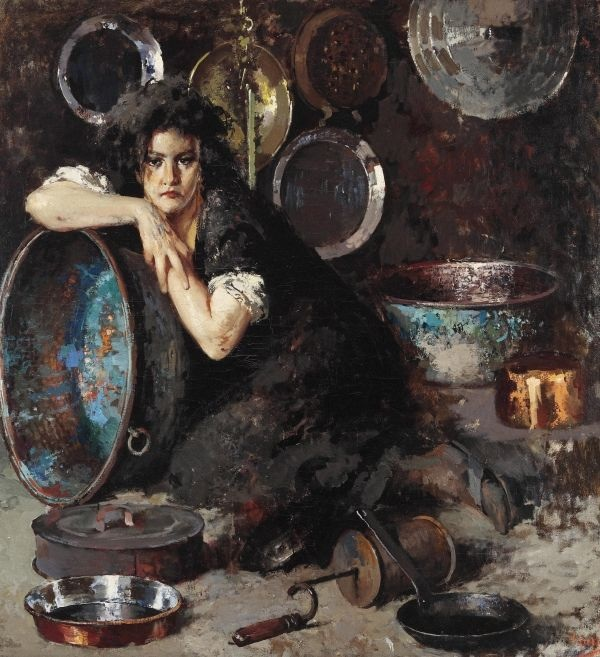
Kitchen Woman

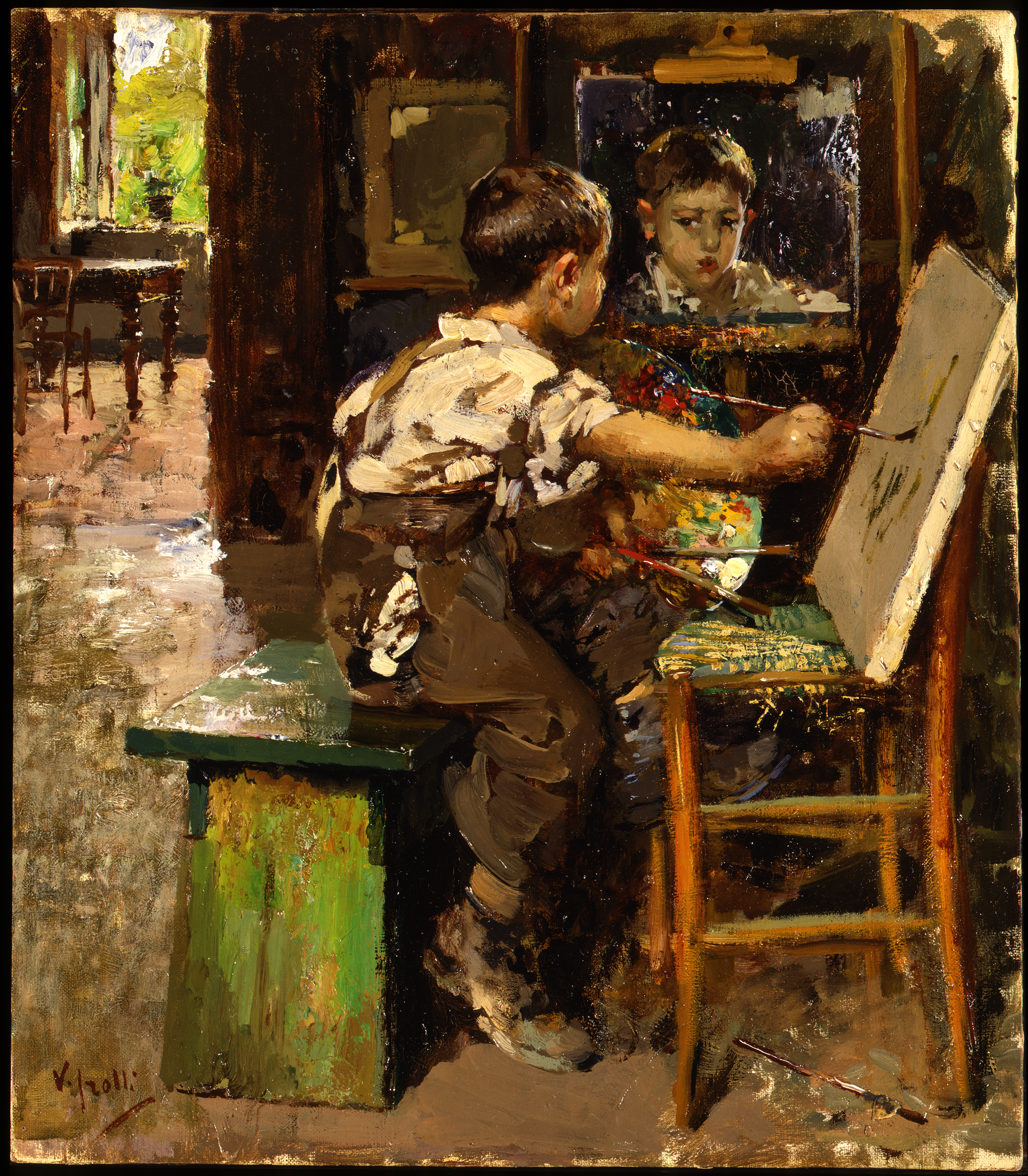
Little Painter

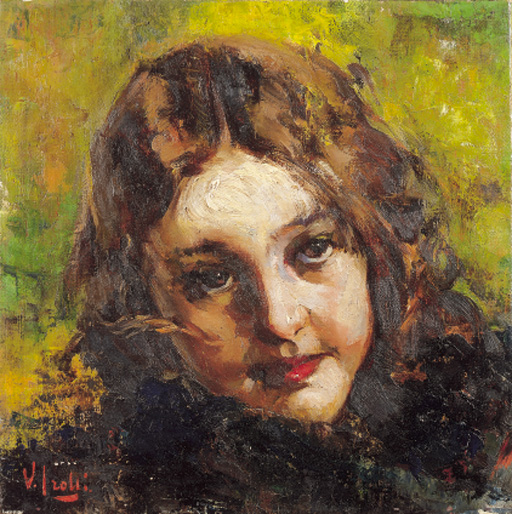
Girl

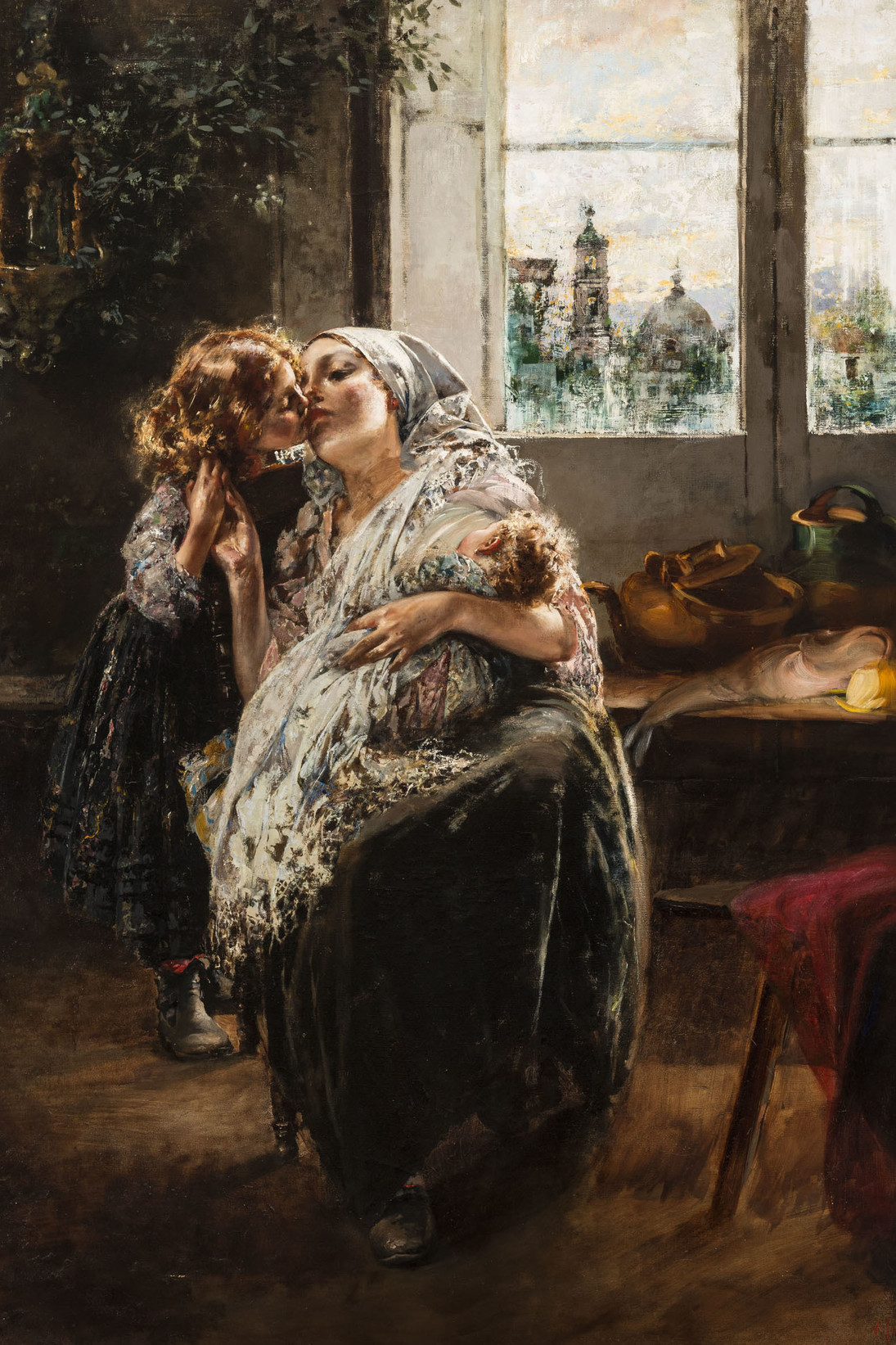
Maternal Joys (c. 1890)

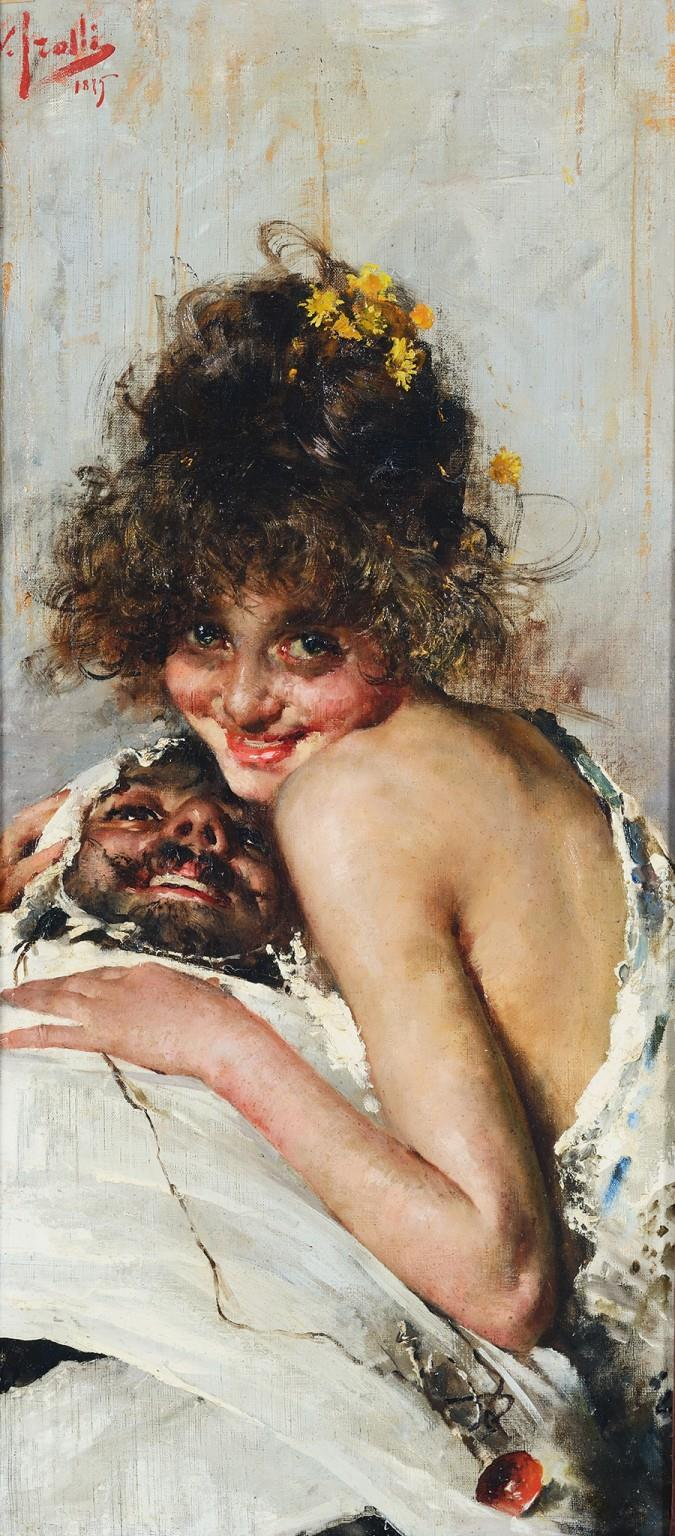
We become like this (1885)

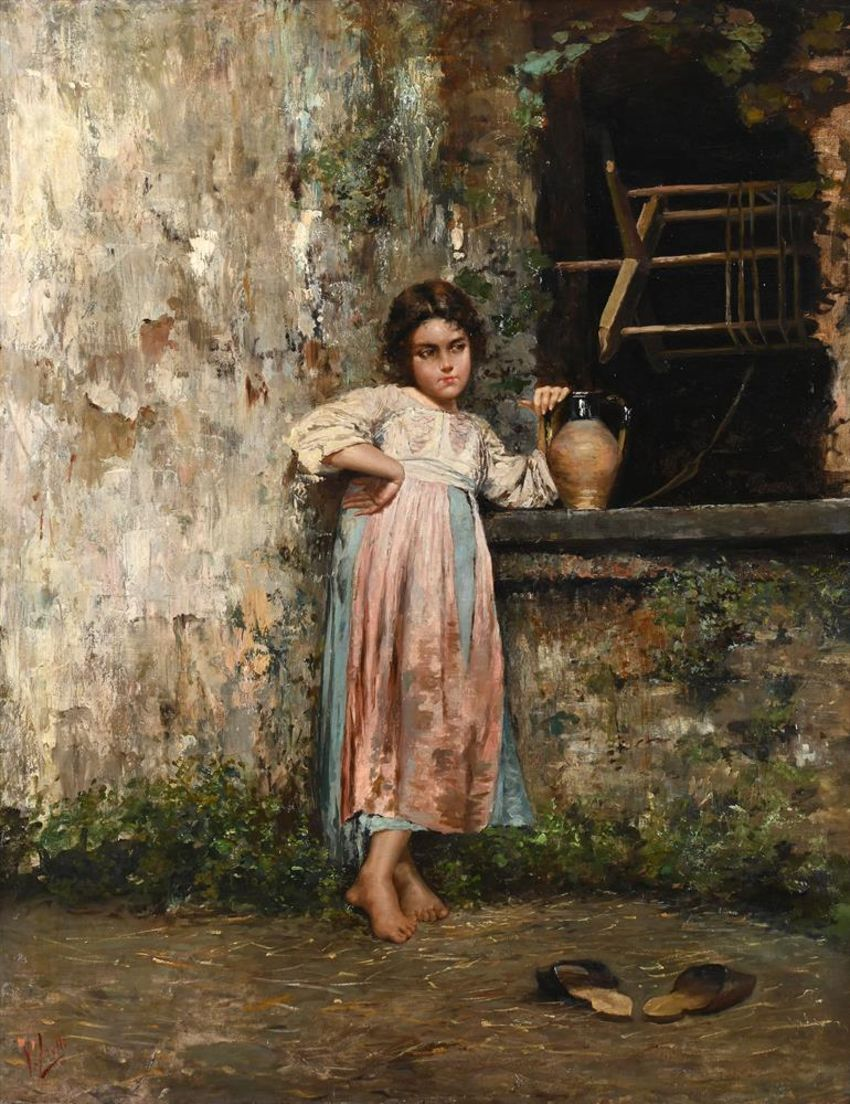
Young Girl at the Fountain

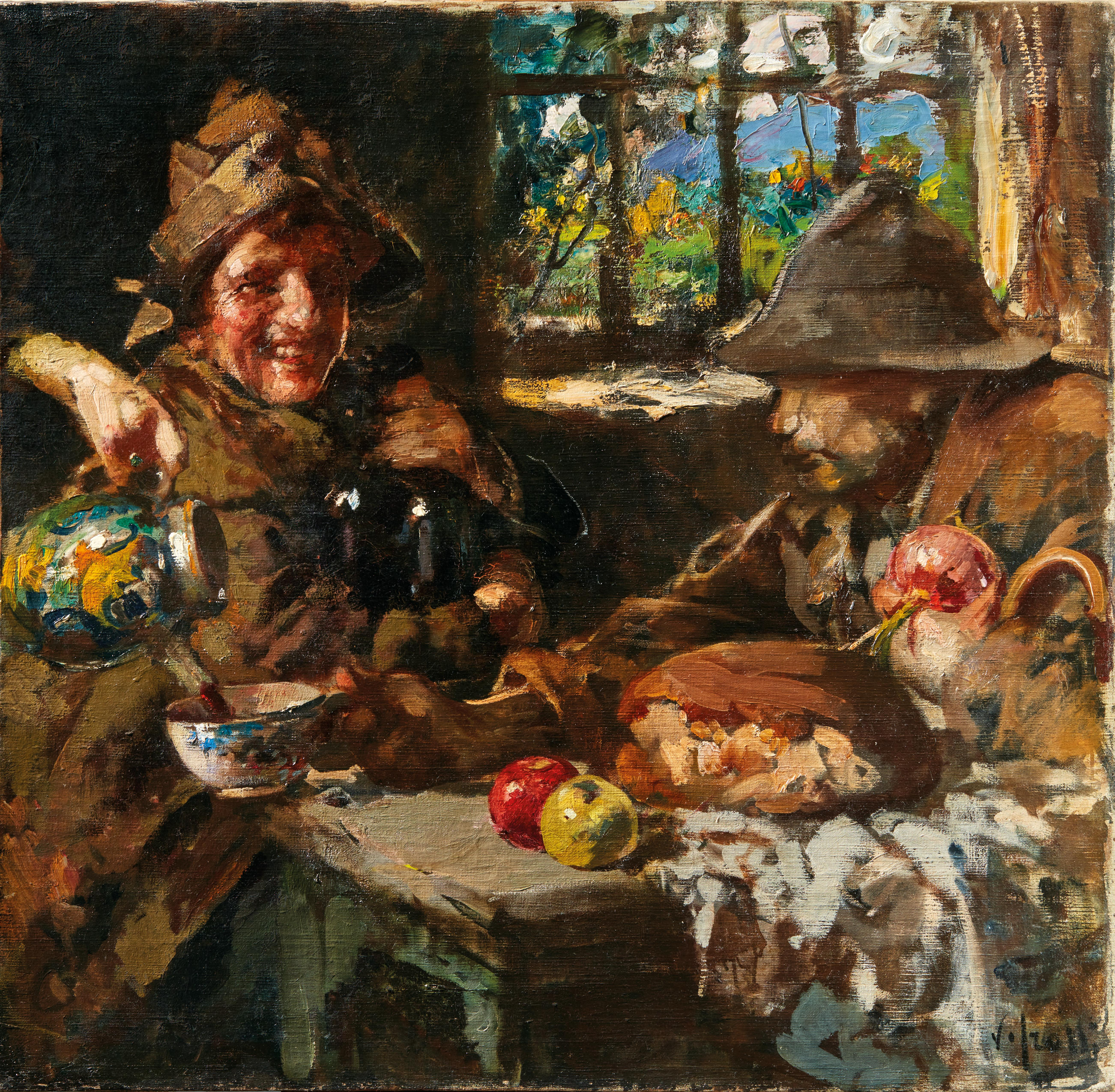
In the Tavern

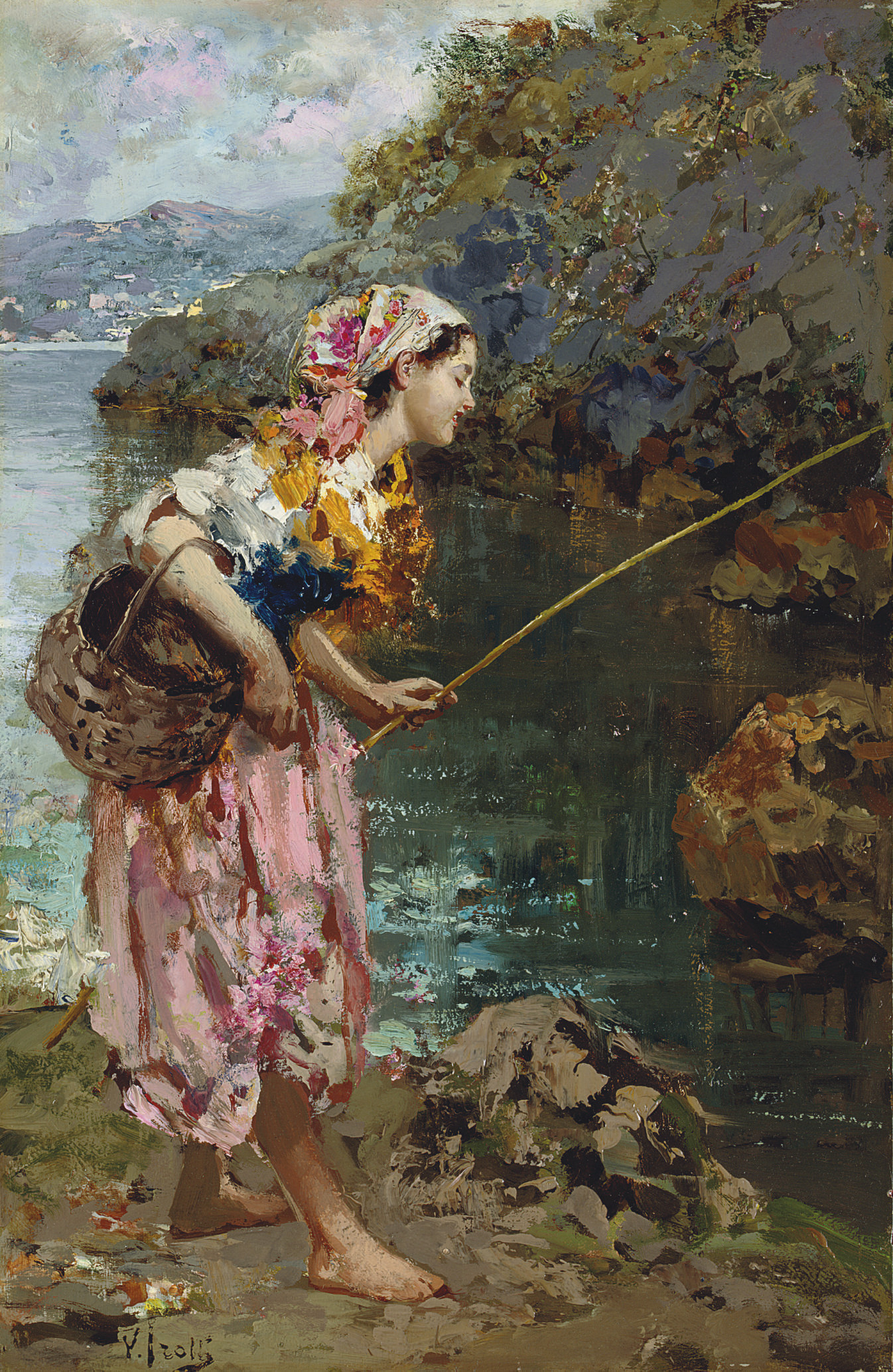
The Fishergirl

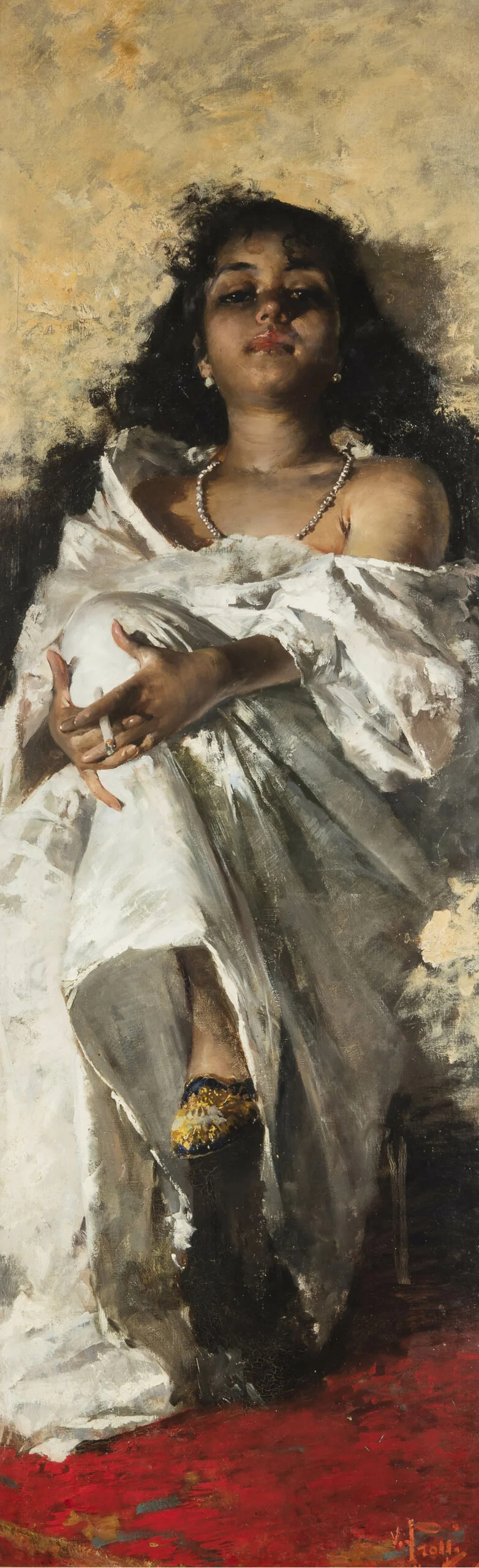
Girl in white Dress Smoking

== Bibliography ==
- Enzo Savoia, Laura Savoia, Vincenzo Irolli. Il pittore del sole, 2002, Bottegantica, ISBN 88-88820-02-7
