= Attilio Pratella =

Italian painter (1856–1949)

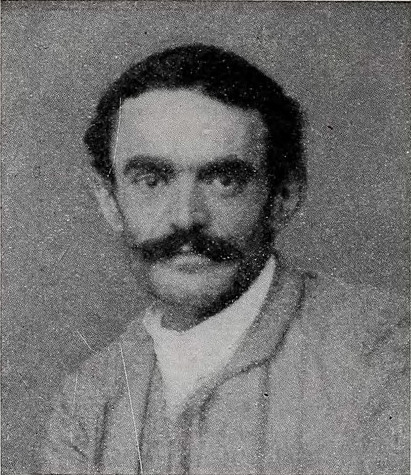
- Born: 19 April 1856; Lugo
- Died: 28 April 1949 (aged 93); Naples
- Occupation: Painter
- Website: www.archiviopratella.it

Signature
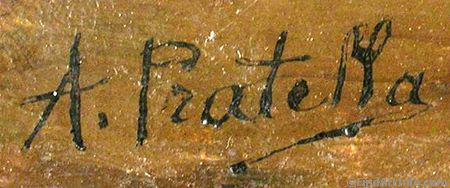

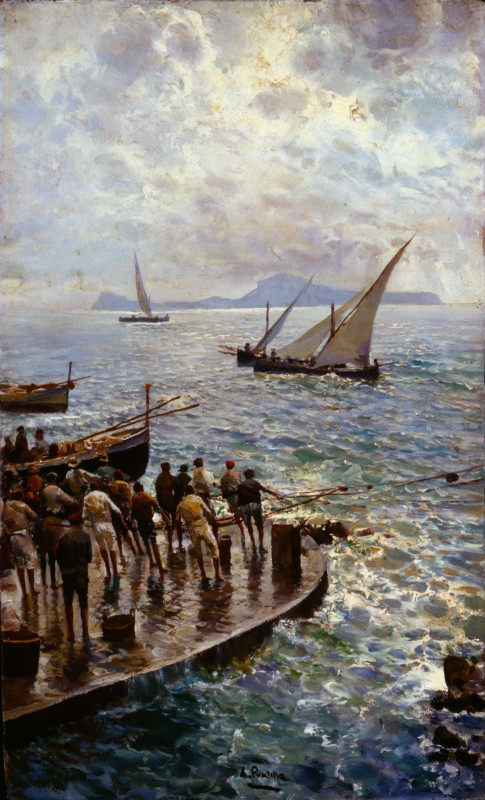
Fishermen on the mole, by Attilio Pratella, 1900 ca. (Cariplo Foundation)

Attilio Pratella (1856 in Lugo di Romagna, Italy – 1949 in Naples, Italy) was an Italian painter, noted for his landscapes and realistic scenes of Neapolitan life.

== Background ==
Pratella grew up in Lugo di Romagna, to parents Alessandro Pratelli and Giuseppa Verlicchi (changing his surname to Pratella in 1876). At an early age he was known for his talent and hard work; staying after class alone to work on his painting. At 16, he illustrated a surgery book for a doctor from Bologna.

He attended the Trisi College, studying with painter Ippolito Bonaveri. From 1877 to 1878, he studied on scholarship at the Accademia di Belle Arti di Bologna.

On winning a Campagnoli scholarship in 1880 at age 24, he moved to Naples to study at the Accademia di Belle Arti di Napoli. To support himself during this period, he painted popular tourist sketches for the workshop of Masto Peppe (Giuseppe Massa). He also executed ceramic decorations for the Cesare Cacciapuoti workshop, creating imitations of Capodimonte porcelain, collaborating with antiques dealer Charles Varelli.

In 1887 he married Annunziata Belmonte, moving with her to the Vomero neighborhood of Naples in the early 1920s, at first to Via Luca Giordano. Together the Pratellas had five children: Fausto (1888-1964), Ugo (1890-1978), Paolo (1892-1980), Eva (1897-1996) and Ada (1901-1929). Their sons Fausto and Paolo, and his daughter Ada also became painters. The area where they lived in Vomero gradually became an artist colony, where his friend and artist Giuseppe Casciaro lived nearby. He would ultimately spend the remainder of his life in Naples.

Pratella died in 1949, at his home on Piazetta Aniello Falcone, near Villa Floridiana in the Vomero neighborhood of Naples. Subsequently, a street in Naples and Lugo di Romagna were named in his honor.

== Work and exhibitions ==
Pratella's work is highlighted by his very small, quickly rendered Neapolitan views, noted for their use of very fine grays and greens alternating with sudden warm tones, and strong whites. Favorite subjects were Naples' markets and waterfront, along with the neighboring hills of Vomero, the island of Capri and the coast of Sorrento.

Notable titles include: Impression; Landscape: Twilight, Green; A corner of Posillipo; Strada del Vomero; In Campagna; and Valle di Camaldoli.

His works are exhibited in the main public Italian Modern Art Galleries of Milan, Naples, and Rome.

== Bibliography ==
- "Omaggio a Pratella". "Catalogo Mostra della Galleria Medea". Napoli, 1950
- Alfredo Schettini: "Attilio Pratella". Edizioni Morano, Napoli, 1954
- "Tre maestri napoletani : Casciaro Giuseppe, Migliaro Vincenzo, Pratella Attilio", Galleria d'arte Sant' Andrea 28 gennaio -10 febbraio 1956.Genova, 1956
- AA.VV. "Mercato della Pittura Napoletana" with preface by R. Schettini. Cin. Ed, 1978
- Saverio Amendola, "Attilio Pratella", Edizioni La Mediterranea Arte, Napoli 1999
- Mariantonietta Picone Petrusa: "La Pittura Napoletana del '900". Franco Di Mauro Editore, Napoli, 2005
- Enzo Savoia: "Attilio Pratella : il narratore dei mille volti di Napoli". Bottegantica, Bologna 2007
