= Pietro Scoppetta =

Italian painter (1863–1920)

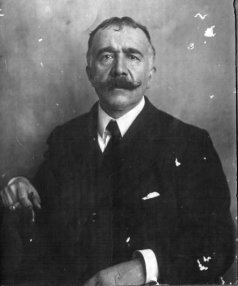
- Pietro Scoppetta
- Born: Pietro Scoppetta; 1863; Amalfi, Province of Salerno, Italy
- Died: 1920 (aged 56–57); Naples, Italy
- Education: Istituto of Fine Arts, Naples
- Known for: Painting
- Movement: Impressionism

Pietro Scoppetta or Scappetta (Amalfi, Province of Salerno, 1863 – Naples, 1920) was an Italian painter, painting in an Impressionist style using both oil and pastels.

== Biography ==
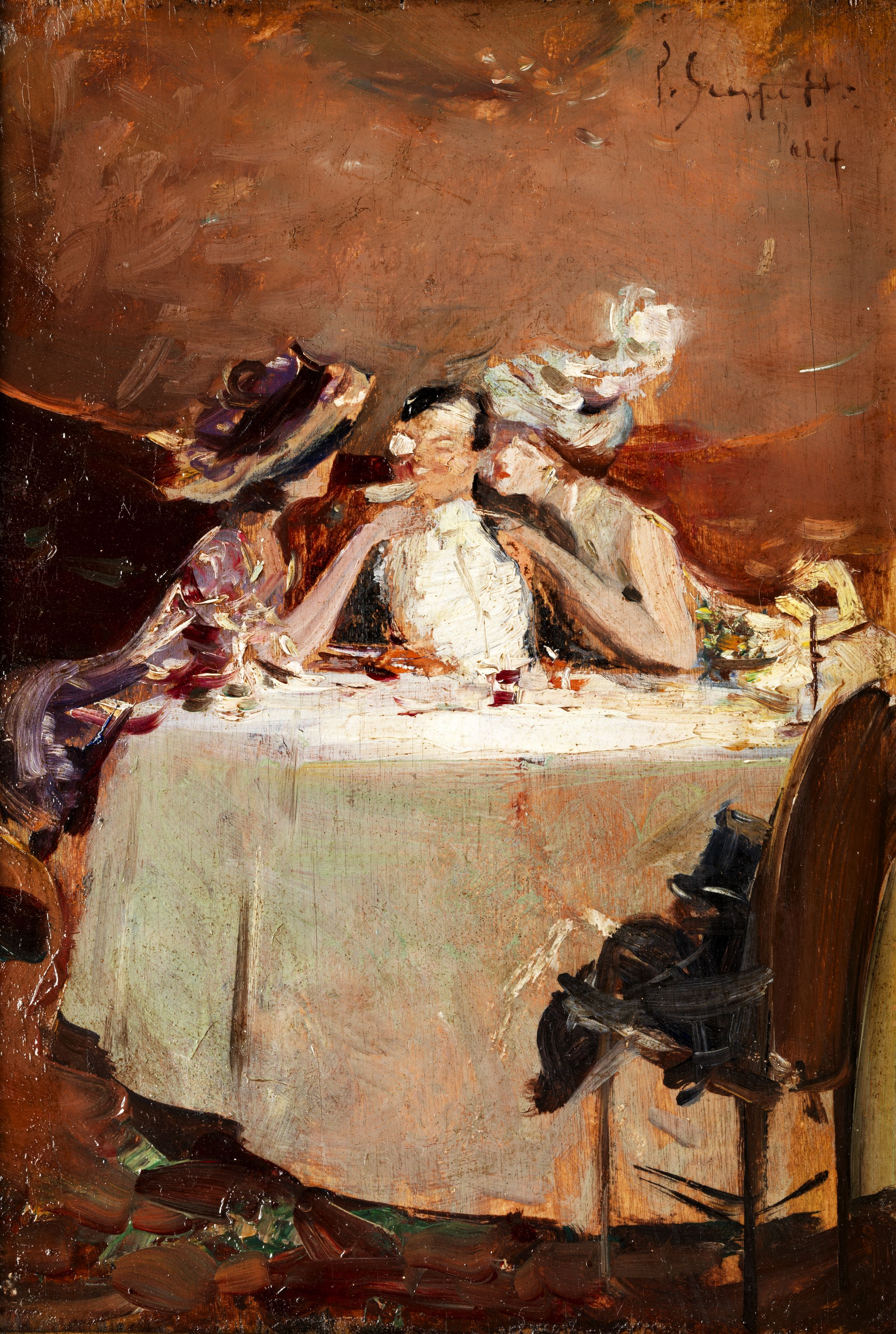
Café

He moved in 1891 to Naples to study painting at the Istituto of Fine Arts under cavaliere Giacomo di Chirico, then moved to Paris (1897–1903), London, and Rome for a number of years. In Naples, he frequented the Caffè Gambrinus, where he befriended Salvatore Di Giacomo, D'Annunzio and Matilde Serao. He painted figures and landscapes. In 1920 at the Biennale of Venice, he merited a posthumous exhibition of 35 works. He designed the covers of various illustrated journals, for example Ilustrazione Italiana of the Milanese firm of Fratelli Treves. In 1875 at the Promotrice in Naples, he exhibits: Chi è là?, a painting once at the Royal Pinacoteca of Capodimonte; In 1887 at the same Mostra: Mercato; At the Beach, At London, and two small genre paintings; in 1887 at Venice: Estate; and in 1888 at the Promotrice of Naples: Sui monti di Amalfi and a Seascape.
