= Salvatore Postiglione =

Italian painter

Salvatore Postiglione (Naples, December 20, 1861 – Naples, November 28, 1906) was an Italian painter, mainly of portraits, and historic and genre subjects, in a Realist style.

== Biography ==
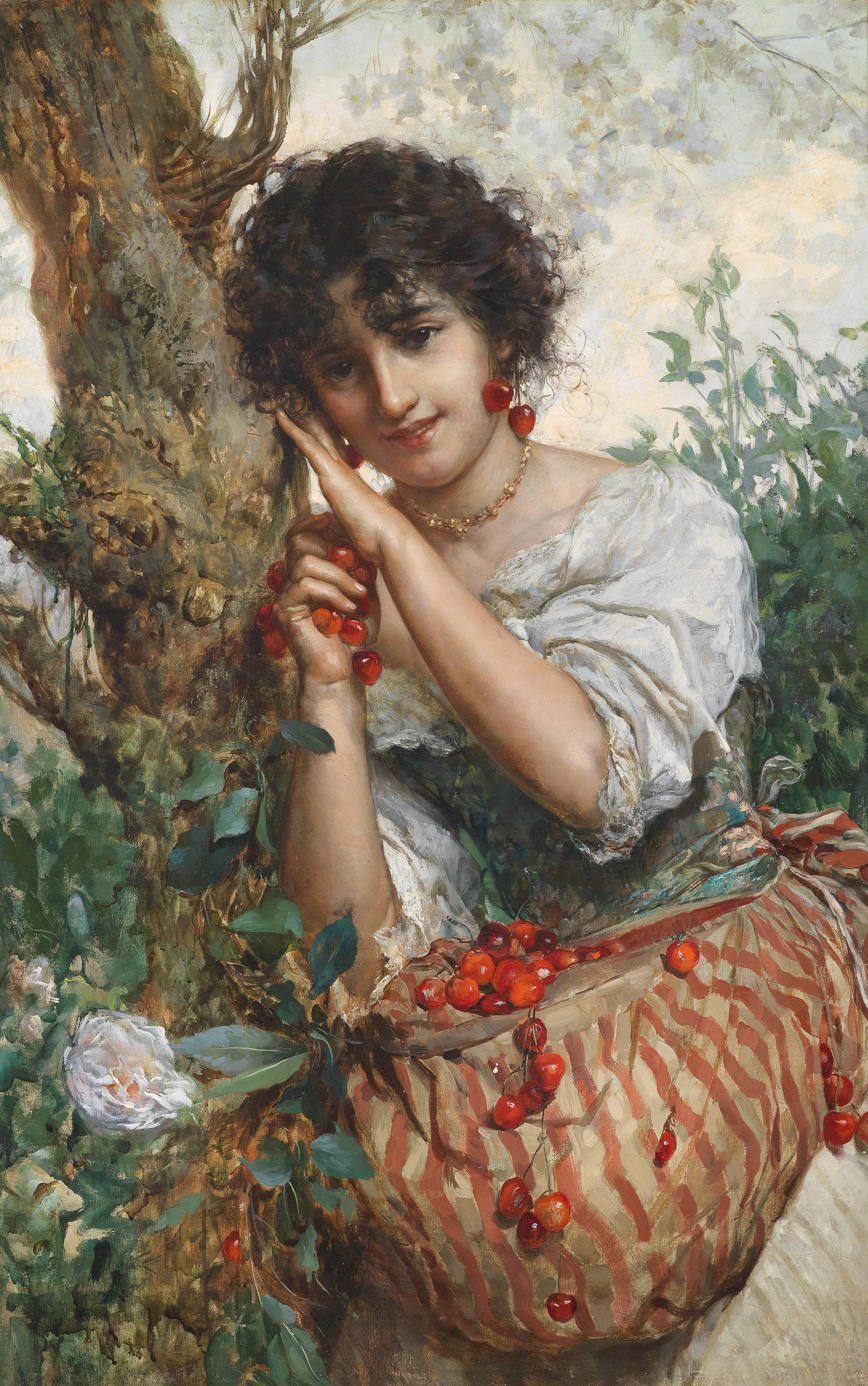
Cherry time (by 1906)

He was born to father Luigi (1812-1881), who was a painter of sacred subjects. His brother, also named Luigi Postiglione and his nephew, and Luigi's son, Luca (1876-1936) were also painters. He studied at the Neapolitan Institute of Fine Arts under his uncle, Raffaele (1818-1897). and Domenico Morelli.

At the Institute of Fine Arts there were youthful works on biblical subjects by Salvatore, but Morelli was to be a strong influence on his style and subject matter. Like Morelli, his religious subject matter often focused on the mystical and morbid spirituality, as exemplified by his canvas of San Pier Damiani at the bedside of a dead Countess Adelaide of Turin, Marquesa of Susa (1887).

In 1883 at Rome, he exhibited: Anche tu fosti sposa and Maria! che incontrò assai. In 1881 at Turin, he exhibited: Arnaldo da Brescia and Pope Adrian IV; at the 1887 National Exhibition at Venice, he displayed the San Pier Damiano canvas, and a Portrait del mio maestro. Another painting by Postiglione titled Kyrie eleison was exhibited at Naples. He also frescoed the hall of the Palazzo della Borsa of Naples, and of Castello Miramare in Trieste.
