= Raffaele Postiglione =

Italian painter

Raffaele Postiglione (Naples, 1818, November 28 - Naples, 1897, February 23rd) was an Italian painter.

== Biography ==
Born to poor parents Raffaele trained in the Academy of Fine Arts in Naples, where he worked under Costanzo Angelini. By 1851, he was working under and with Giuseppe Mancinelli. He also labored alongside Giovanni Salomone. In the 1860s, he was a professor in the Neapolitan Academy along with Federico Maldarelli, Gabriele Morelli, and Antonio Licata. He painted historical and religious canvases. He was the brother of the painter Luigi Postiglione, and uncle of the painter Salvatore Postiglione.
