= Luca Postiglione =

Italian painter

Luca Postiglione (October 18, 1876 in Naples – 1936) was an Italian painter, mainly of portraits, and historic and genre subjects, in a Realist style.

He was the son of the painter Luigi Postiglione. His elder brother, Salvatore Postiglione was also a painter and his teacher. Luigi's uncle, Raffaele (1818–1897) was a professor at the Neapolitan Institute of Fine Arts.

Among his works are L'orfana exhibited at the Italian Exhibition in London in 1904, while Il giglio, and La Soglia were exhibited at the International Exposition in Rome in 1906.
