= Gaetano Esposito =

Italian painter (1858–1911)

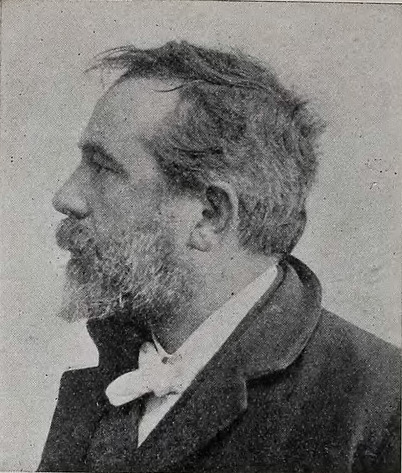
- Born: 17 November 1858
- Died: 8 April 1911 (aged 52)
- Occupation: Artist

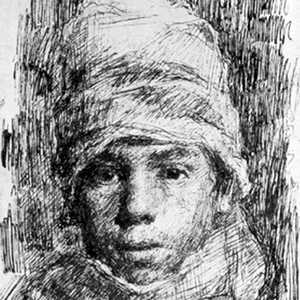
Gaetano Esposito (1874 self-portrait)

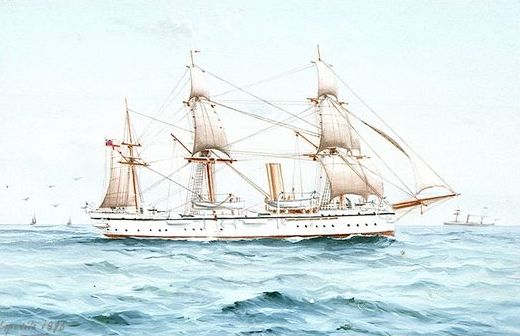
Watercolor of HMS Melita by Esposito

Gaetano Esposito (17 November 1858 – 7 April 1911) was an Italian painter.

== Biography ==
He was born in Salerno. He first studied under Gaetano D'Agostino, but later enrolled at the Royal Institute of Fine Arts of Naples, where he studied under Filippo Palizzi, Domenico Morelli and Stanislao Lista. In these studies, he was funded by a stipend from the government of Salerno. He was influenced by Antonio Mancini, a lifelong supporter, especially in his genre depictions of the activities of the lower classes of Naples. He also painted portraits.

Gaetano, like other Neapolitan painters such as Morelli, rebelled from an academic temperament. He was described as Irascible, diffident, and prone the jealousy, he was not one to gain friends among his colleague painters, with the exception of Antonio Mancini... and this lack of affability forced him to have to sell briskly to be able to sustain himself. He did get commissions in the last decade of the 19th century to decorate the Caffè Gambrinus in Naples, the ceiling (1895) of the Garibaldi Communal theater at Santa Maria Capua Vetere, and the ceiling (1897–1898) of the refurbished Palazzo della Borsa in Naples where he painted allegories of work and history.

He began to concentrate on painting marine vedute, similar to those that had been traditional for the School of Posillipo. For example, he painted the scenic Palazzo Donn'Anna a number of times. At the 1904 Universal Exposition at Saint Louis, he won a gold medal for a large seascape canvas.

His painting of Christ among the children was displayed at the 1880 Turin exposition. At the 1877 National Exhibition, he displayed Un triste presentimento, Una figlia della colpa una cucina tutta fumo. In 1883, at Rome, he displayed Da Posillipo. In 1884 in Turin he exhibited Brillo, Tipo napoletano, Primi palpiti, Aspetti, and Colloquio piacevole.

In 1910, a young female pupil, Venturina Castrignani, committed suicide after being romantically rejected by Gaetano. Tormented by guilt, Esposito himself committed suicide on 7 April 1911, in Sala Consilina in Salerno.
