= Giuseppe Casciaro =

Italian painter

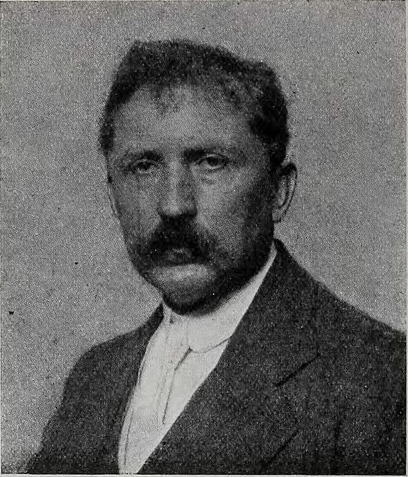
- Born: 9 March 1863; Ortelle
- Died: 25 October 1941 (aged 78); Naples
- Occupation: Painter, teacher, watercolorist, pastellist, artist

Giuseppe Casciaro (March 9, 1861 – October 25, 1941) was an Italian painter, active mainly in Naples.

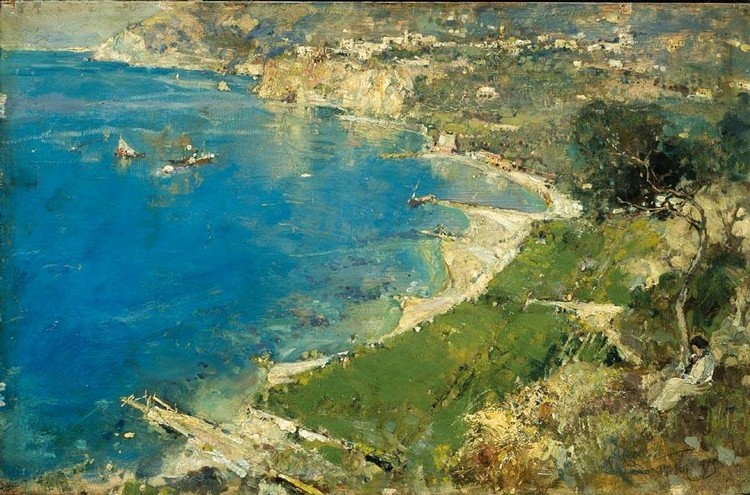
Sorrento (1915), private collection.

He was born in Ortelle, Province of Lecce, Region of Apulia. Orphaned at the age of twelve, he was raised by a paternal uncle, a priest. He was schooled in lyceum gymnasium of Maglie, where his uncle hoped he would start studies towards a career in medicine. However, there he was first instructed in art by Paolo Emilio Stasi, who aided him in enrolling in the Neapolitan Academy of Fine Arts under Morelli and Palizzi. His uncle initially thought Giuseppe was in Naples attending the university, and upon learning of his deception, ceased his support of the young man.

At the academy, Francesco Paolo Michetti, from whom he learned to paint landscapes in pastels. Much of his life was painting landscapes of the shoreline and of his native Ortelle. At the end of the century, he travelled to Paris, where he met Giuseppe De Nittis and his circle. He gained a nomination to be professor at the Institute of Fine Arts of Urbino. He often visited and tutored members of the Royal House of Savoy about pastel painting. His works were exhibited throughout Europe and Argentina. He died in Naples in 1941.
