= Alceste Campriani =

Italian painter (1848–1933)

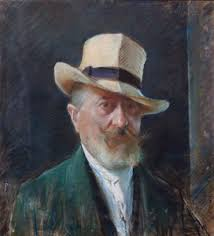
- Born: 11 February 1848; Terni
- Died: 1933 (aged 84–85); Lucca

Alceste Campriani (11 February 1848 – 1933) was an Italian painter noted for his landscapes, especially of the Neapolitan countryside.

== Life and career ==
He was born in Terni from a noble family. His father's political attachment to the cause of Italy prompted his arrest by Papal officers. This led to economic difficulties for the Campriani family. He was enrolled in the Naples Institute of Fine arts, but he proved recalcitrant to academic discipline, and abandoned the institute to paint on his own. After a few years of near destitution, he was about to abandon an artistic career altogether, when he garnered a prize for composition awarded by the institute. He befriended Giuseppe De Nittis, who introduced him to the Goupil Gallery, who went on to market over one hundred of his works to England, France, Belgium, and the Americas.

During the early 1860s, he joined the group of artists known as the School of Resina (or in Italy known as the Republica di Portici), founded by Marco de Gregorio, Giuseppe De Nittis, and Federigo Rossano were also soon working. He and other artists including Raffaele Belliazzi, Antonio Leto and Edoardo Dalbono joined sometime after the group's formation in 1860–61. Working in the Neapolitan countryside, members of this group were isolated from other art groups or movements and tended to focus on Morellism and folklore painting. His paintings mixed genre and landscape, focusing on the traditions and countryside of Campania. Like Filippo Palizzi, he often painted children and animals in pastoral pursuits.

At the 1880 Exhibition in Turin, he exhibited Il Ritorno dal Santuario di Montevergine, which gained him much praise. Among his other works are Il ritorno dal mercato, Tra Foggia e Manfredonia, Il mercato dei cavalli, La partita a bocce, Caccia con la civetta, Spiaggia delle Sirene, Il venditore di polli, I bagnanti a Napoli, Colloquio, Jardin d'acclimation, Autunno sul Vesuvio exhibited in Florence in 1896, Ritorno dal pascolo exhibited in Turin in 1898, Scirocco sull costiera d'Amalfi, Tramonto in Danimarca, Pastorale, Mattino exhibited in Milan in 1898, and Primavera exhibited in Rome in 1895.

Campriani died in 1933 in Lucca.

== Gallery ==
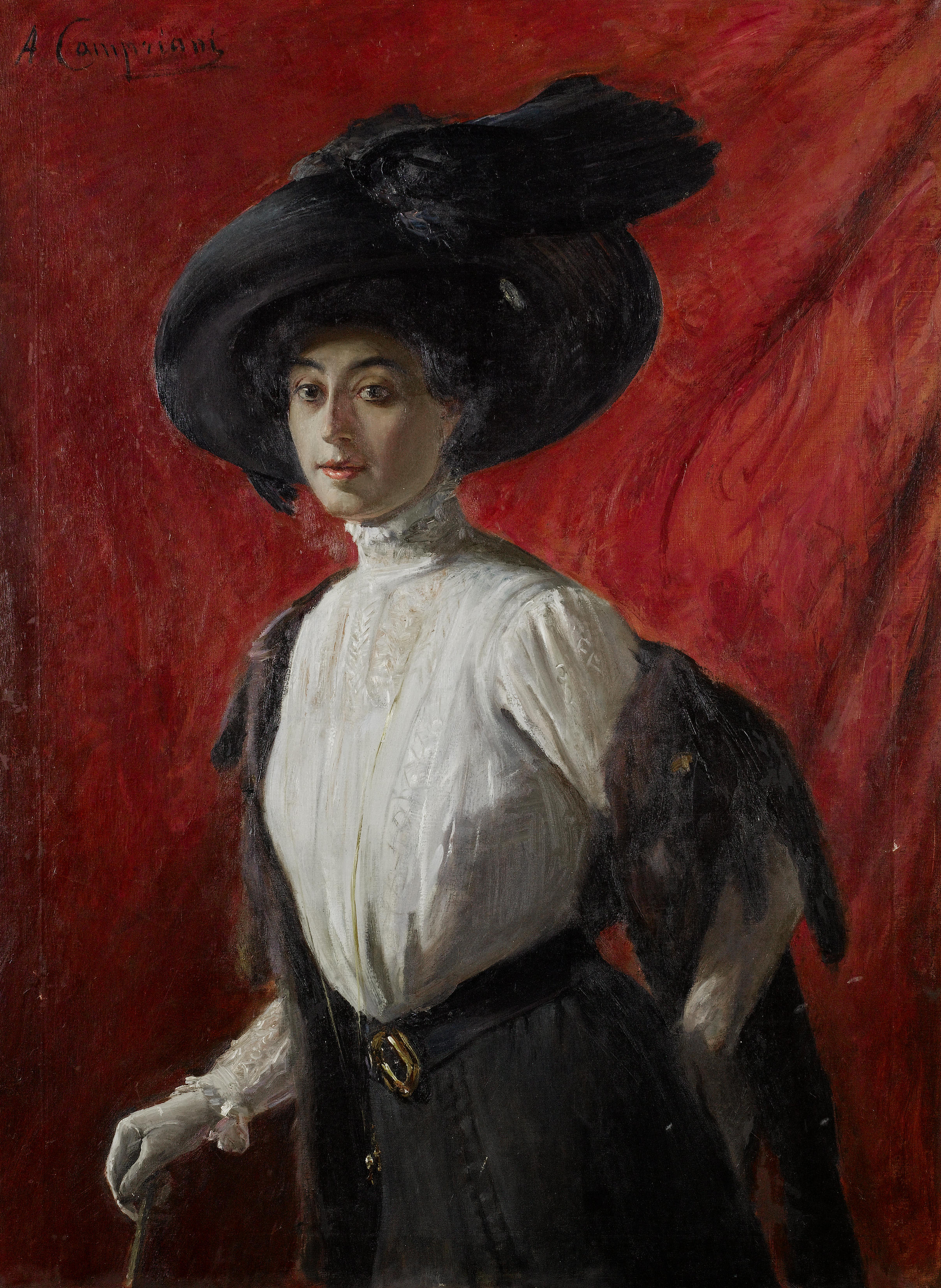
Portrait of Adelina Campriani, daughter of the artist, 1910

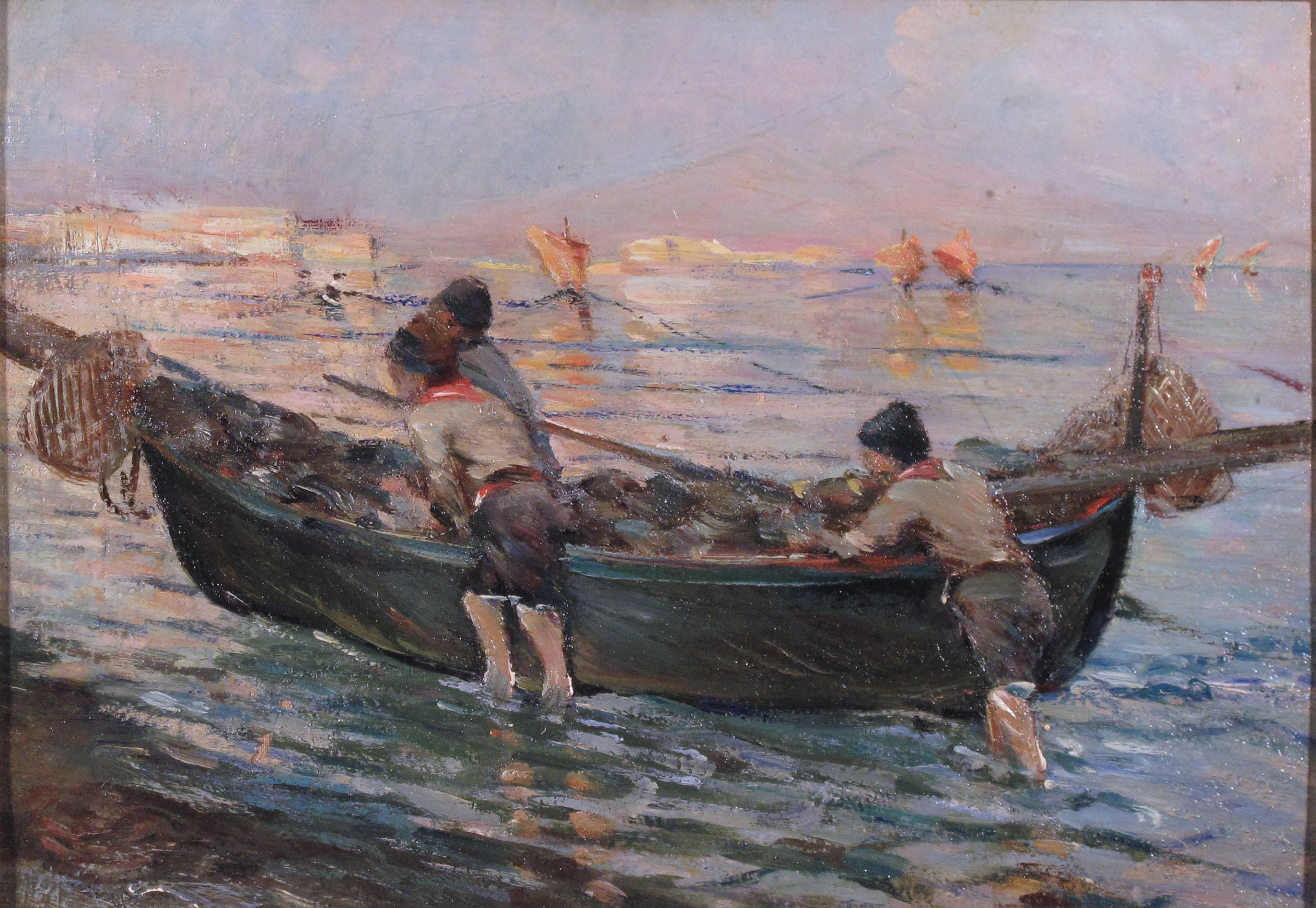
Fishermen

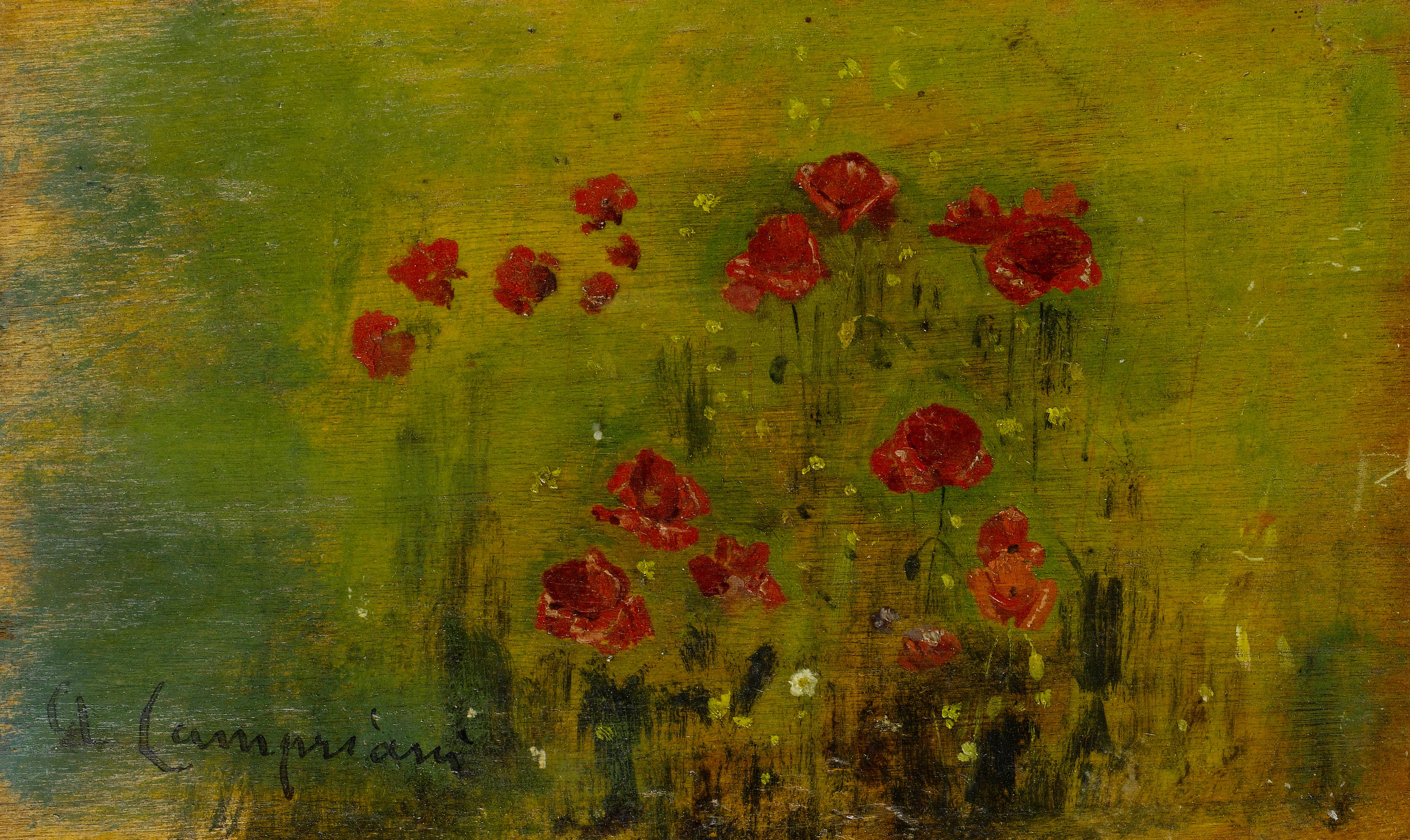
Poppies, oil on panel,
11 × 18 cm (4.3 × 7.1 in)

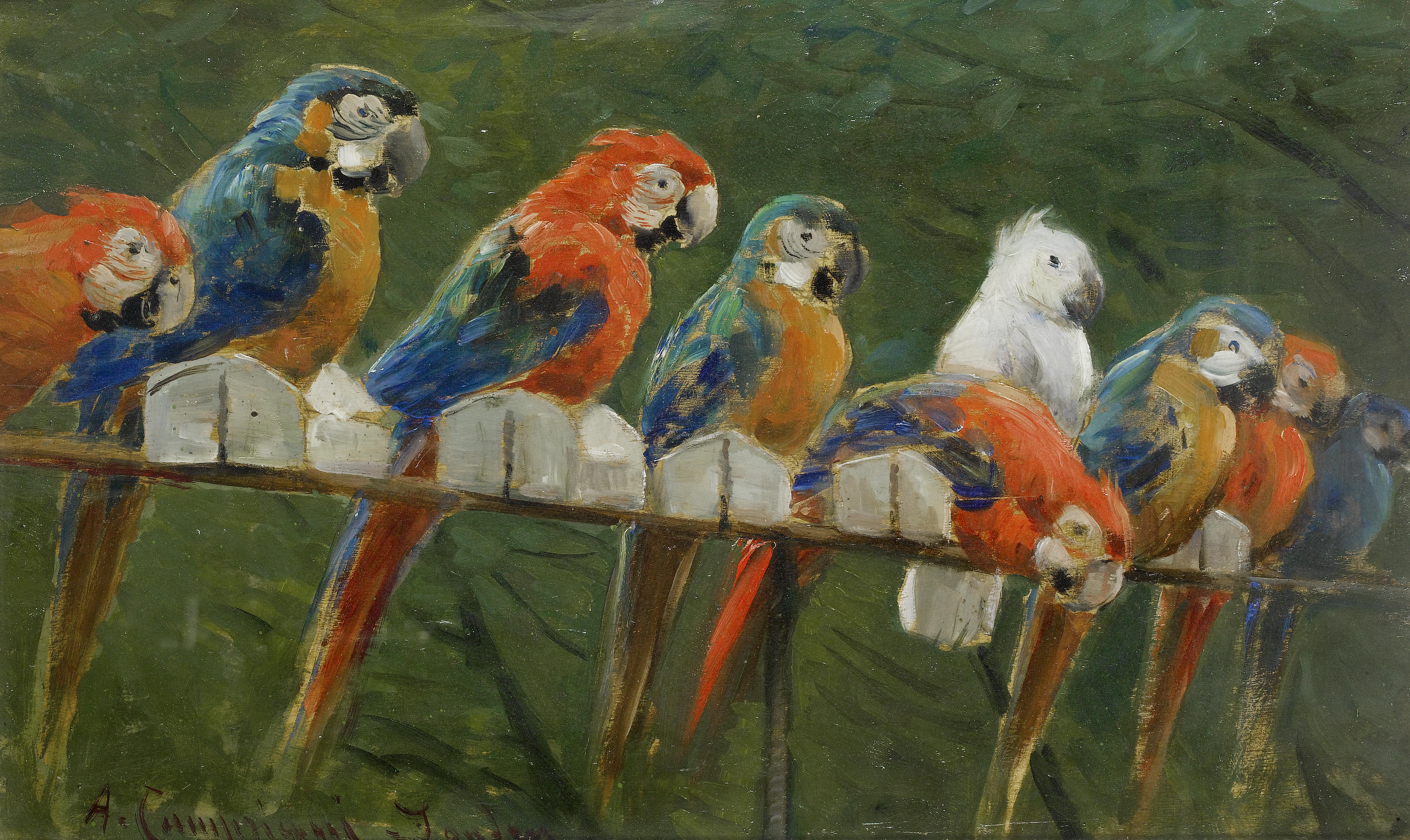
Parrots

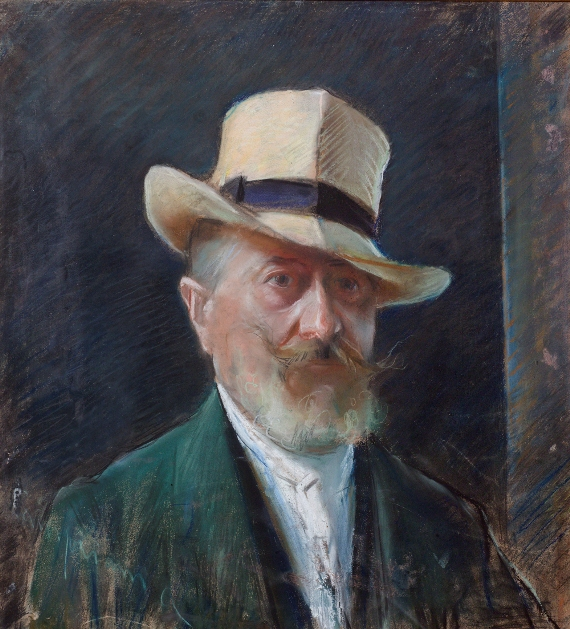
Self portrait of Alceste Campriani
