= Marco de Gregorio =

Italian painter

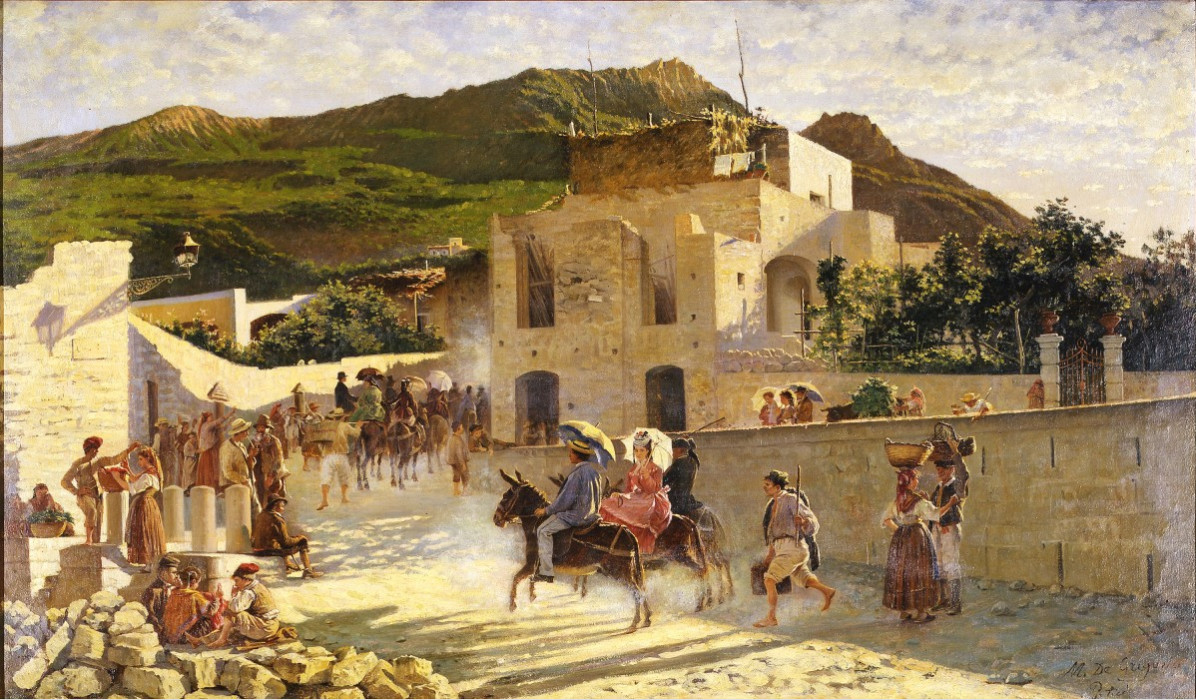
- Capri, painting by Marco De Gregorio
- Born: 12 March 1829; Resina, near Naples
- Died: 1875 (aged 45–46); Naples, Italy
- Education: Academy of Fine Arts of Naples
- Known for: Painter
- Notable work: Lo Zappatore (1873)
- Style: School of Resina; Republica de Portici
- Movement: Orientalist

Marco De Gregorio (12 March 1829 – 16 February 1876) was an Italian painter who would form part of the School of Resina, painting works that spanned the spectrum from historical to genre topics.

== Biography ==
He was born in Resina (present day Ercolano) near Naples. He studied at the Academy of Fine Arts of Naples after 1850, where he was influenced by Gonsalvo Carelli and Giacinto Gigante. An ardent patriot, in 1860, he joined Garibaldi and even participated in the Battle of Volturnus.

On his return to Campania in 1860-1861, he moved to Resina, where Giuseppe De Nittis, Adriano Cecioni, and Federigo Rossano were also soon working. These would constitute the nucleus of the School of Resina (or in Italy known as the Republica di Portici), an artists' group founded by de Gregorio, Rossano and Nittis. Sometime later, the painters Raffaele Belliazzi, Alceste Campriani, Antonio Leto and Edoardo Dalbono also joined the group. De Greggorio was the most vibrant personality in the group. Working in the Neapolitan countryside, members of this group were isolated from other art groups or movements and tended to focus on Morellism and folklore painting. Although an active member of the group, de Greggorio always imparted an individual finesse to his work, an avant-garde style rich in the synthesis of various styles, yet revealing a profound sense of the artist's individual feelings and poetry.

In around 1870, he travelled to Egypt, and some of his subsequent paintings have Orientalist themes. the Arab Market and Egyptian Boys, now in the San Martino Art Museum, are examples of his later work. He died in Naples in 1875.

== Work ==
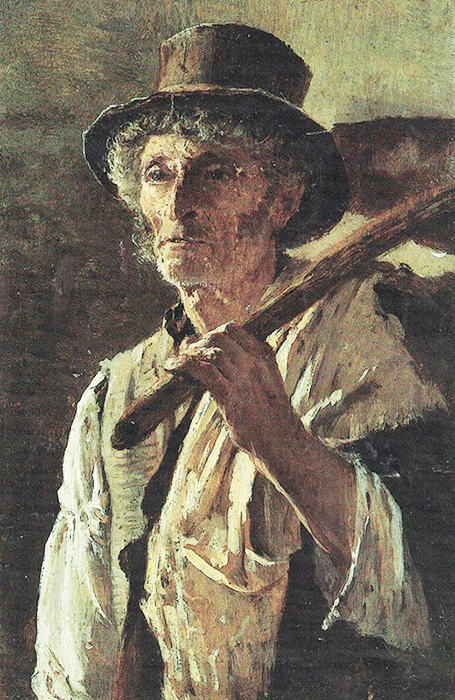
Lo Zappatore (The Ditch Digger), 1873

Critics have praised de Gregorio's painting, Lo Zappatore (pictured), as a fine example of portraits of the labouring poor. The digger's emaciated features under a straw hat and the tattered clothes are a tribute to the stoicism with which the subject faces daily hard work. It neither idealises nor protests the nature of the working poor, but simply presents it as an objective reality.

== See also ==
- List of Orientalist artists
- Orientalism
