= Teatro Bellini, Naples =

Theatre in Naples, Italy

Coordinates: 40.8510°N 14.2508°E

Teatro Bellini
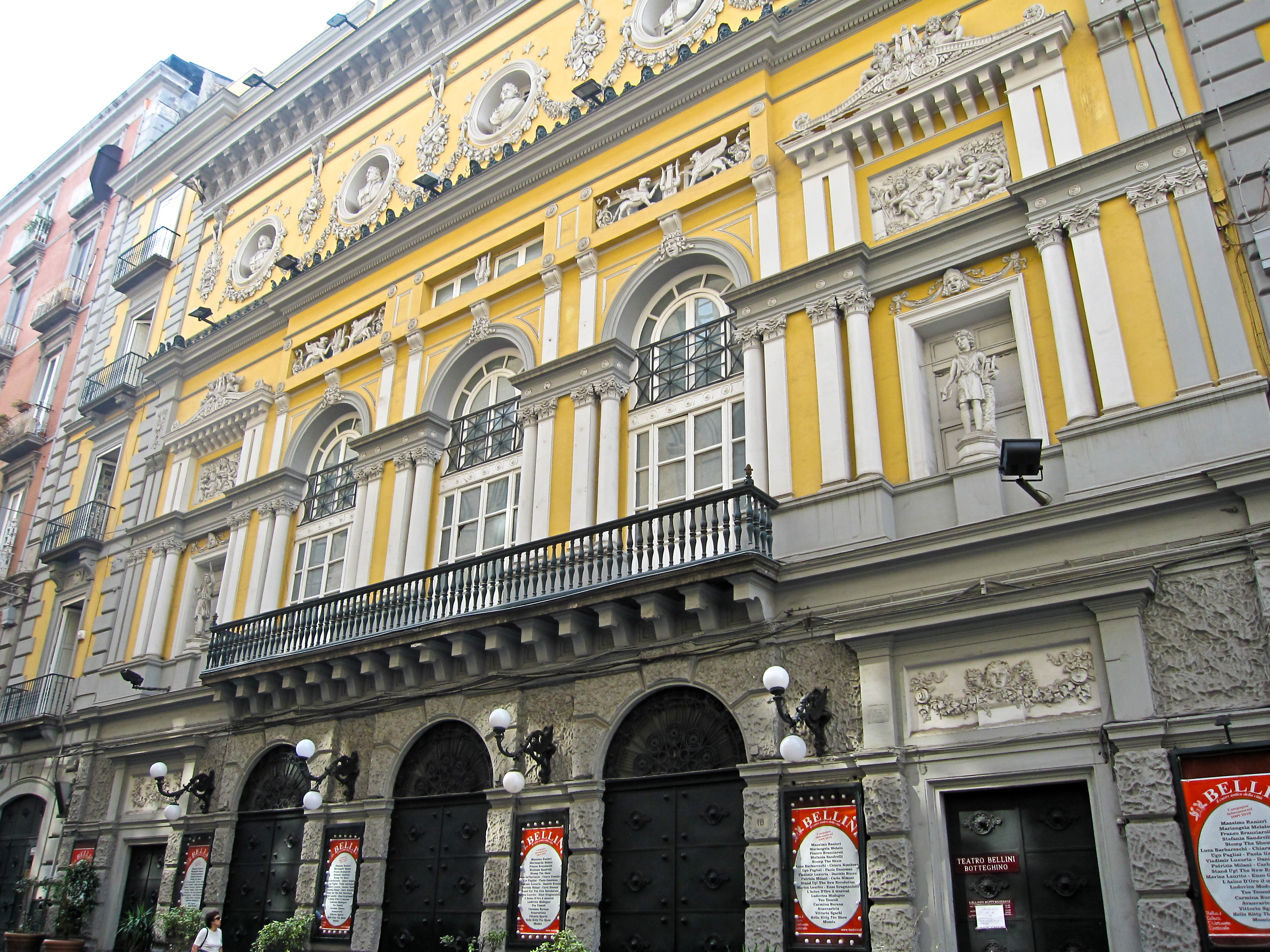
- View of the exterior
- Interactive map of Teatro Bellini
- Address: Via Conte di Ruvo, 14
- Location: Naples, Italy
- Capacity: 940
- Type: Theatre; opera house

Construction
- Groundbreaking: 1864
- Built: 1878
- Architect: Carlo Sorgente
- Builder: Nicola Lacapra Sabelli

Website
- teatrobellini.it

Teatro Bellini is a private theatre and opera located in the centre of Naples, across the street from the Academy of Fine Arts of Naples on Via Conte di Ruvo.

The house is named after the Sicilian-born composer Vincenzo Bellini, who is best known for his operas and who spent some time in the 1820s studying music in the city. In addition, there in an opera house name after him, the Teatro Massimo Bellini in Catania, Sicily, his birthplace.

== History ==
In 1864, Baron Nicola Lacapra Sabelli commissioned the theatre's creation by the architect Carlo Sorgente on Via Vincenzo Bellini. This theatre, located near Piazza Dante Alighieri, burned down in 1869, and a new one was inaugurated a few hundred feet from the original locale.

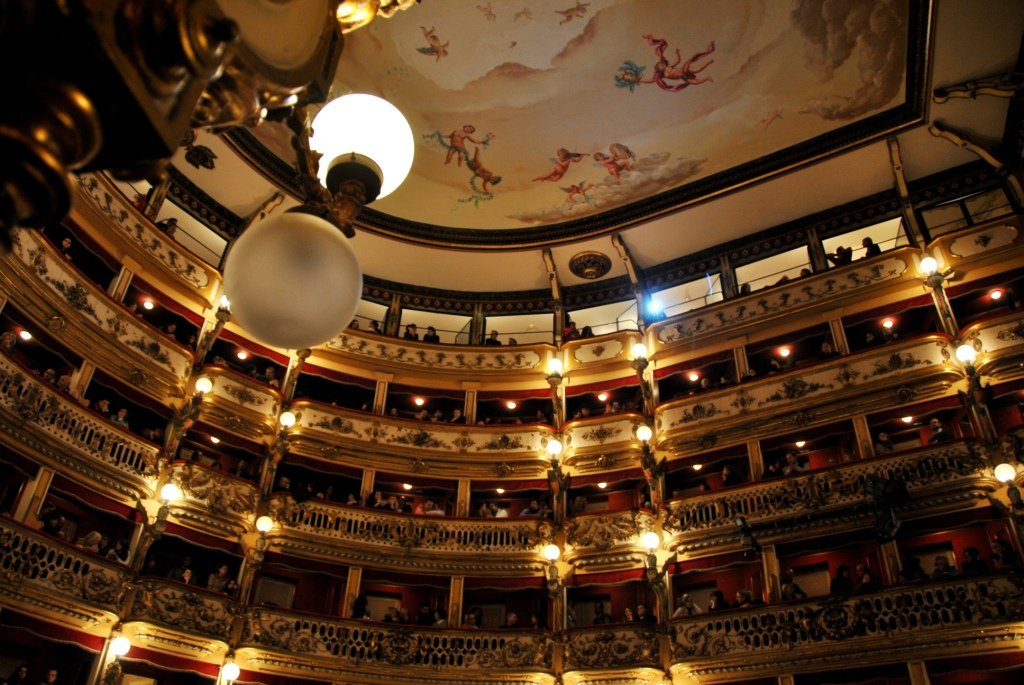
Interior of theater as it looks today

On 6 February 1877, Bellini's opera I puritani was performed there. The theatre has six tiers of box seats surrounding an oval floor. The interior decorations were created by Giovanni Ponticelli, Pasquale Di Criscito, and Vincenzo Paliotti, and the oil portrait of the opera composer was done by Vincenzo Migliaro.

For nearly a century, the theatre presented operas and operettas, but by the 1960s, it had become dilapidated, used only as a cheap movie theatre, and it was considered for demolition. In 1962, the Bellini hosted its final operatic spectacle with Masaniello, before being acquired in 1986 by a group led by local artist and producer Tato Russo. They restored the house for operatic and theatrical productions, which are now frequently presented.
