= Carlo Brancaccio =

Italian painter (1861–1920)

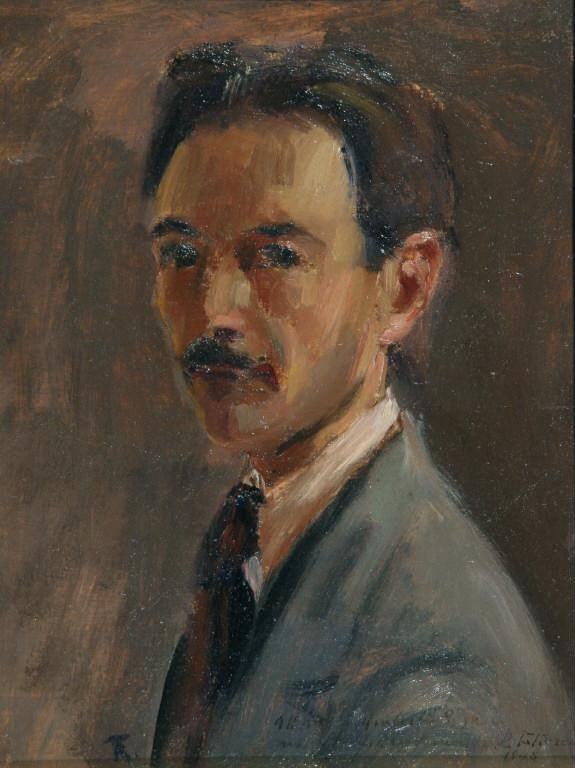
- Carlo Brancaccio, Self-portrait, date unknown
- Born: March 6, 1861; Naples, Italy
- Died: 1920 (aged 58–59)
- Education: Eduardo Dalbono
- Movement: Orientalist

Carlo Brancaccio (Naples, March 6, 1861 – 1920) was an Italian painter, active mainly in an Impressionist style.

== Biography ==
While he initially had studied mathematics, he abandoned this to study painting by age 22 years. He was mentored by Eduardo Dalbono. His main subjects were city streets, sea- and landscapes, mostly vedute of Naples. At the 1887 Promotrice of Naples he displayed: Passe-partout, and many sketches of the city including the interiors of churches. In 1888, he displayed a large Seascape of Capri; in 1889, Toledo in the Rain; and in same year at the Brera Exposition in Milan, he exhibited the Piazza of the Carmine of Naples.

He won a gold medal at the Exhibition in Rome in 1893. He also painted Neapolitan genre subjects, including: Ore tristi (1898); Impressioni di Napoli (Berlin 1890); and Strada di Almalfi (1897).

== Gallery ==
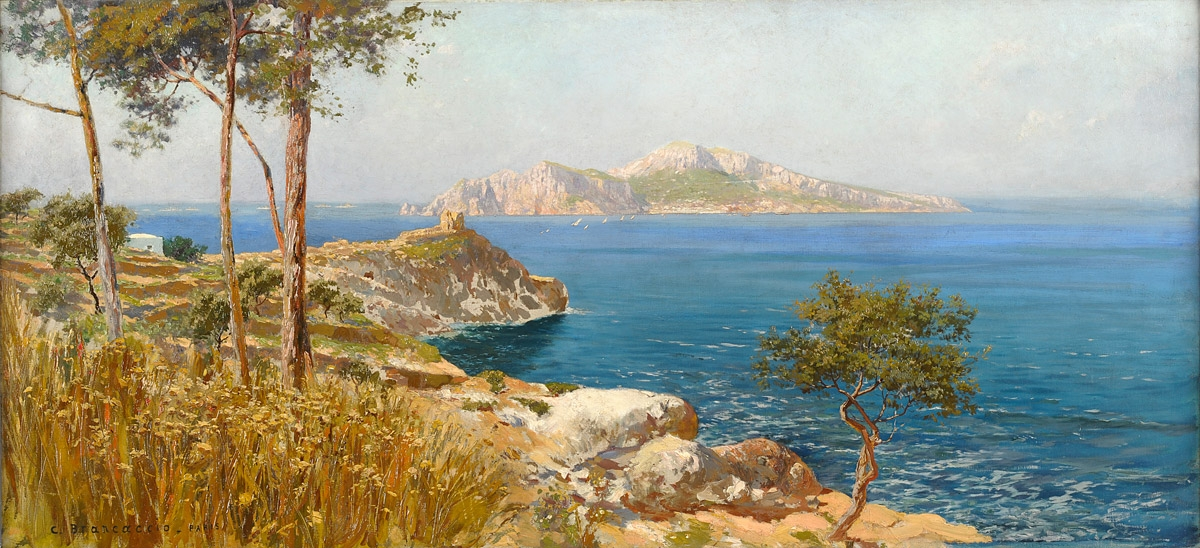
View of Capri

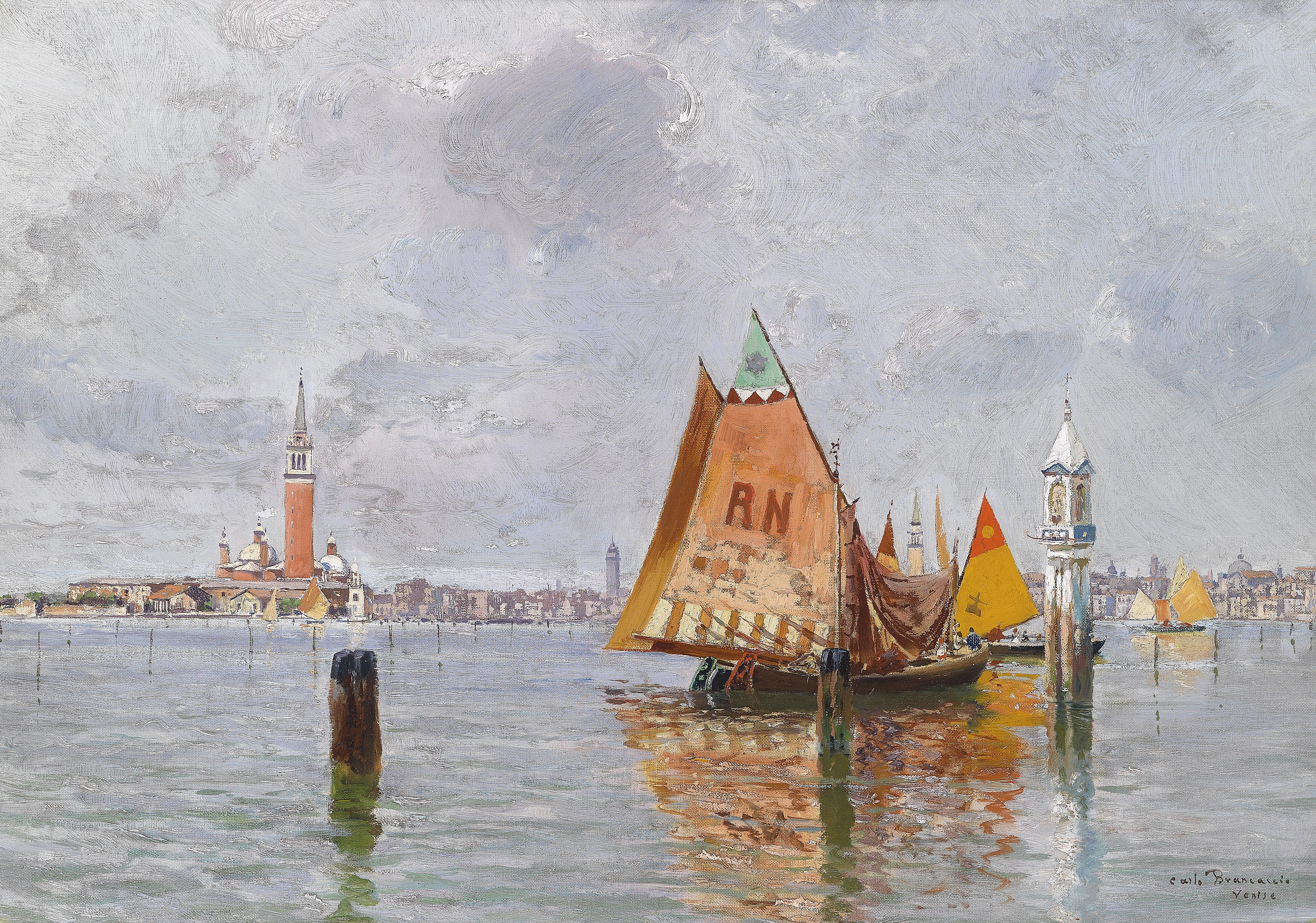
Fishing Boats in Venetian Lagoon

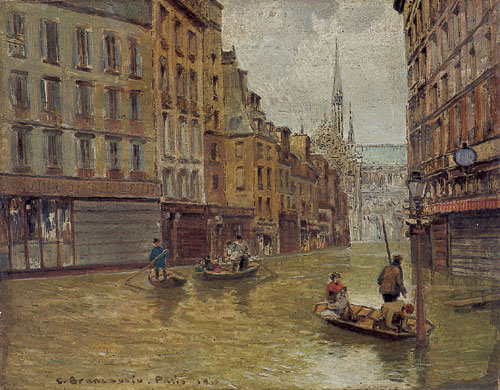
1910 Flood in Paris

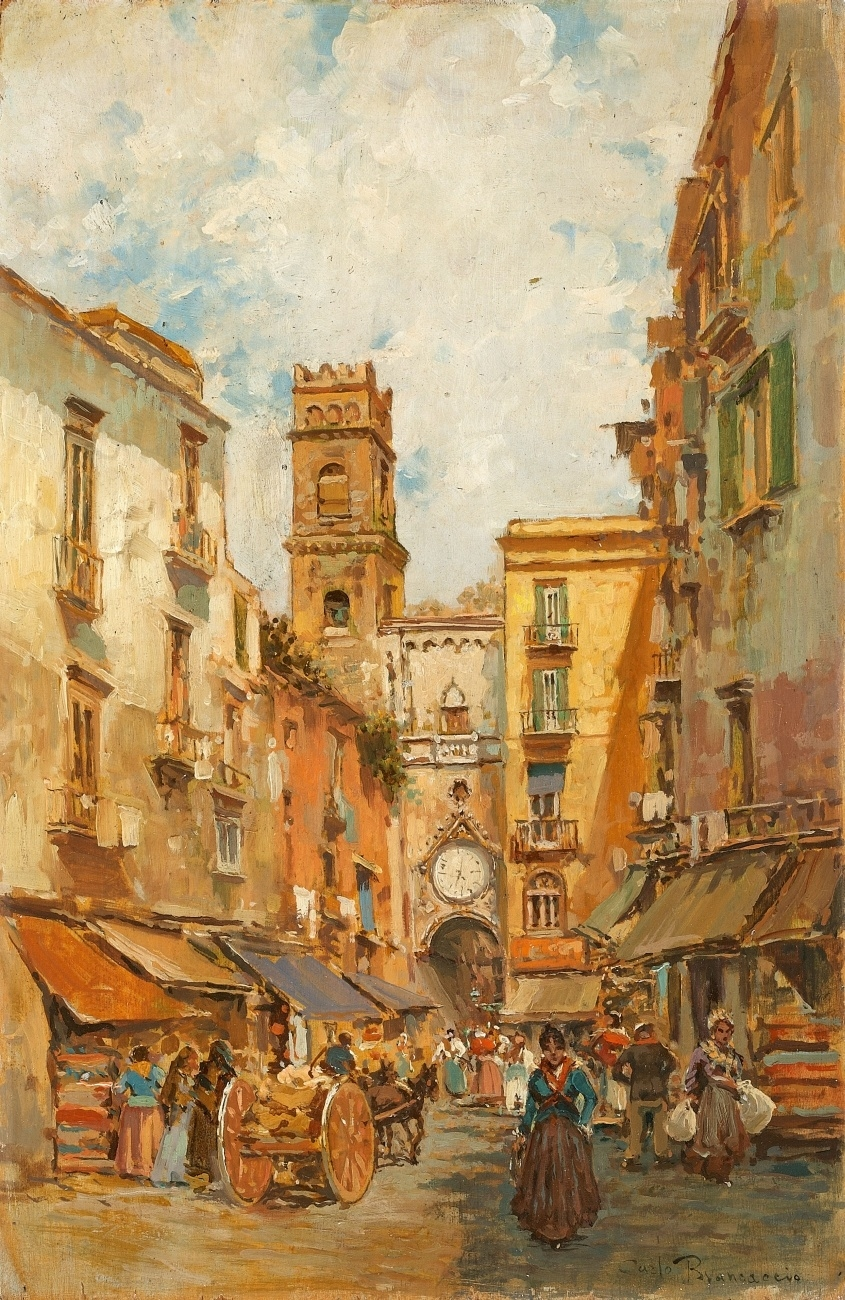
Neapolitan Street

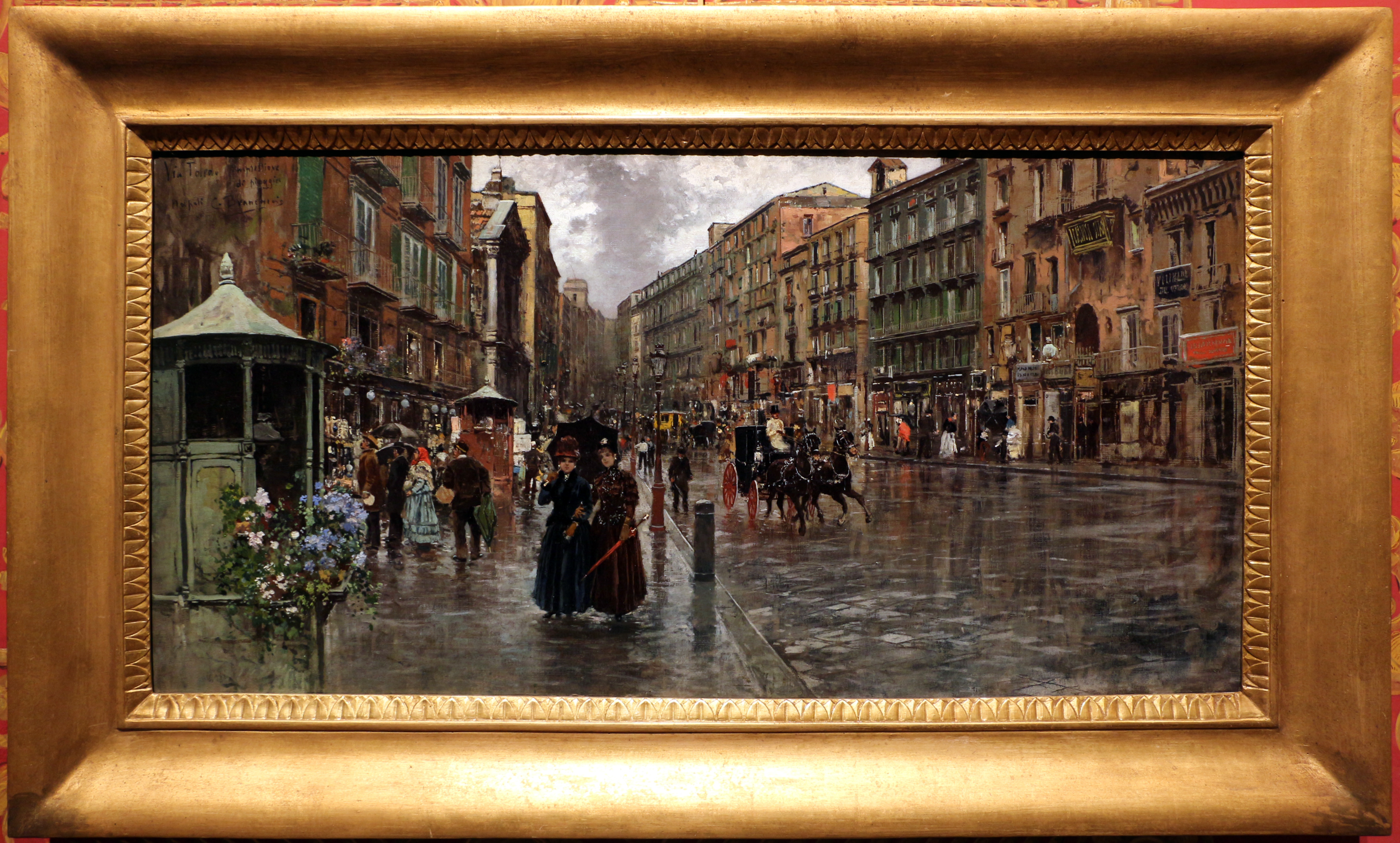
Napoli via Toledo, impressione di pioggia, 1888–89

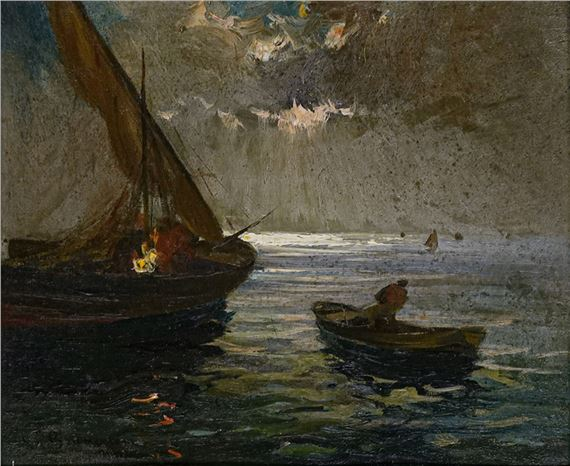
Pescatori
