= Federigo Rossano =

Italian painter

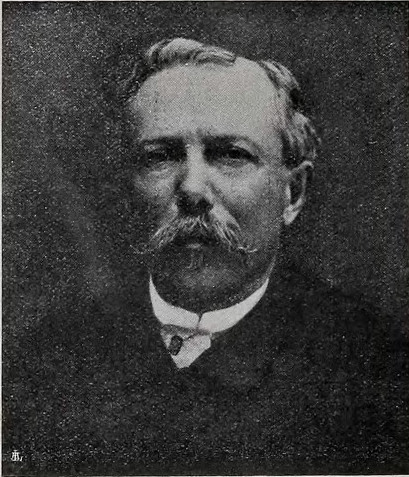
- Born: 31 August 1835
- Died: 15 May 1912 (aged 76)
- Occupation: Painter

Federigo or Federico Rossano (31 August 1835 – 15 May 1912) was an Italian painter in a Realist style.

== Biography ==
Rossano was born in Naples, and studied painting at the Royal Academy of Fine Arts of Naples, at the objection of his father, a former soldier in the army of Murat, and who wished his son to study architecture. He was influenced by the School of Posillipo, and the style Filippo Palizzi, but developed his own subject matter. He painted many seascapes at the island of Ischia. Other influences were Gennaro Ruo, Giacinto Gigante, and Vincenzo Volpe. In 1858, De Gregorio, invited him to Resina where he stayed at a room in what was once the Palazzo Reale. He also met there the painters Giuseppe De Nittis and Adriano Cecioni. Together with Marco de Gregorio, this group formed what was called the School of Resina

He traveled to Paris with De Nittis, and in 1876 he exhibited the canvas Covoni at the Paris Salon. He was influenced above all by the School of Barbizon. He had some year of success in Paris.

Returning in about 1893 to Portici, he married, and was named instructor of landscape painting at the Royal Institute of Fine Arts in Naples and instructor of design at the Scuola di Santa Orsola Benincasa. He had economic difficulties, and was helped by a few friends including the painter Eduardo Dalbono. He died in Naples.

Gubernatis describes him as realistically reproducing the phenomena of nature including scenes of rural peasant life. In 1872 at the Exhibition of Milan, he displayed four paintings: The Hunter, La Marina d'Ischia, la Baia di Naples sull'ora del tramonto, and the Port of Naples, a moonlit scene. He traveled to Paris, and painted Dintorni of Paris, exhibited in Naples at the 1877 Exposition of Fine Arts. In 1880 at the Exhibition of Turin, in 1880, he exhibited: La messe, and in 1880 at Rome, he exhibited: Crepuscolo, la Primavera, and Raccolta di frutta.
