= Antonio Leto =

Italian painter (1844–1913)

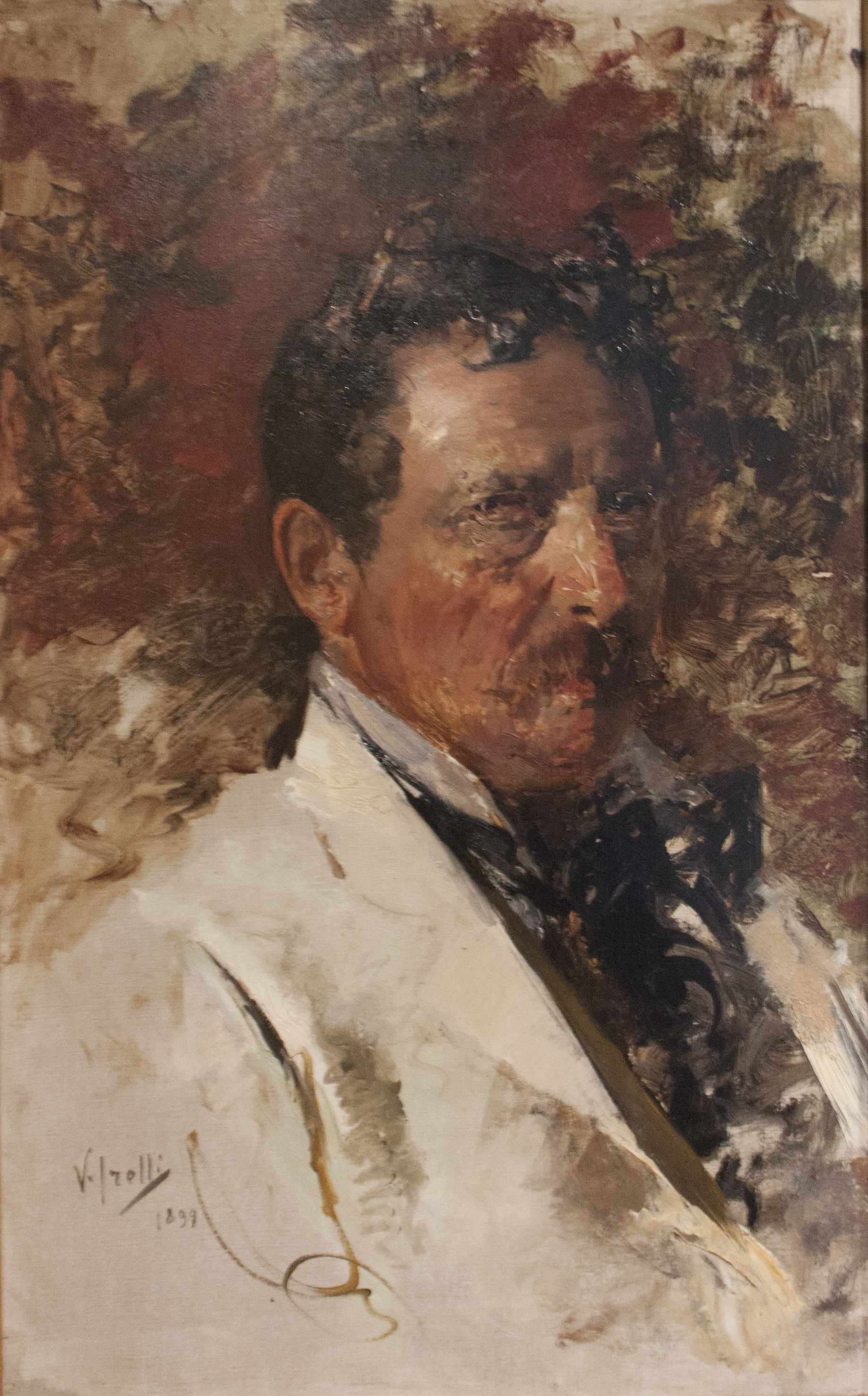
- Portrait of Antonio Leto by Vincenzo Irolli
- Born: 14 June 1844; Monreale, Kingdom of the Two Sicilies
- Died: 31 May 1913 (aged 68); Capri, Italy
- Known for: Landscape painter

Antonino or Antonio Leto (14 June 1844 – 31 May 1913) was an Italian painter, painting mainly genre/landscape subjects in an impressionistic style.

== Biography ==
He was born in Monreale. In 1861, sponsored by his uncle, he moved to study in Palermo under L. Barba and Luigi Lojacono. He adopted the style and subject matter of Filippo Palizzi, In 1864, he moved to Naples where he was attracted to the Scuola of Resina style of painting fostered by Giuseppe De Nittis. He took lessons from Adriano Cecioni. He painted both in oil, tempera, and watercolor. By 1870, he had won a silver medal at the Mosta Artistica of Palermo with the painting Il Ritorno dal Pascolo and a gold medal at the Regional Exposition of Siracusa for La Bufera. In 1872, he sent A Winter's day in Sicily to the Brera Exposition.

In 1873, he joined in Portici with other painter of the Scuola di Resina, and travelled to Rome and met Francesco Paolo Michetti. In 1874 at Rome, he painted Alla Villa Borgese and Un contadino Romano, exhibited at the 10th Promotrice in Naples. In 1874–75, he won a Sicilian stipend to study in Rome with his work La Raccolta delle Olive

In 1876–1878, he traveled to Florence under a stipend. There he painted livelier cityscapes including Case a Viareggio, Ponte di Santi Trinita, and Passeggiata alle Cascine. After selling many of his works through the Galleria Pisani, in 1879 he moved to Paris invited by A. Goupil of the Goupil Gallery. In 1880, he painted Vecchia Parigi and Le Bois de Boulogne. In Paris, his contemporary painters were Giuseppe De Nittis, Domenico Morelli, A. Mancini, Vincenzo Gemito, A. de Neuville, Édouard Manet, and JL Meissonier.

By 1880, he returned to Palermo, where he decorated the room of the Villa ai Colli (now Opera Pia Istituto Pignatelli) with lively vedute and genre scenes.

After the 1880s, his health did not allow him to travel much, but he was prolific in sending paintings to exhibitions. He moved to Capri in 1882. His I funari di Torre del Greco (1883) was celebrated at the National Exposition of Fine Arts of Rome, and now hangs in the Chamber of Deputies.

Over the next decade many of this subjects focused on seascapes or seashore activities.

Together with Francesco Lojacono and Michele Catti, he forms the so-called canonical triad of the Sicilian landscape artists of the Belle Époque.

== Gallery ==
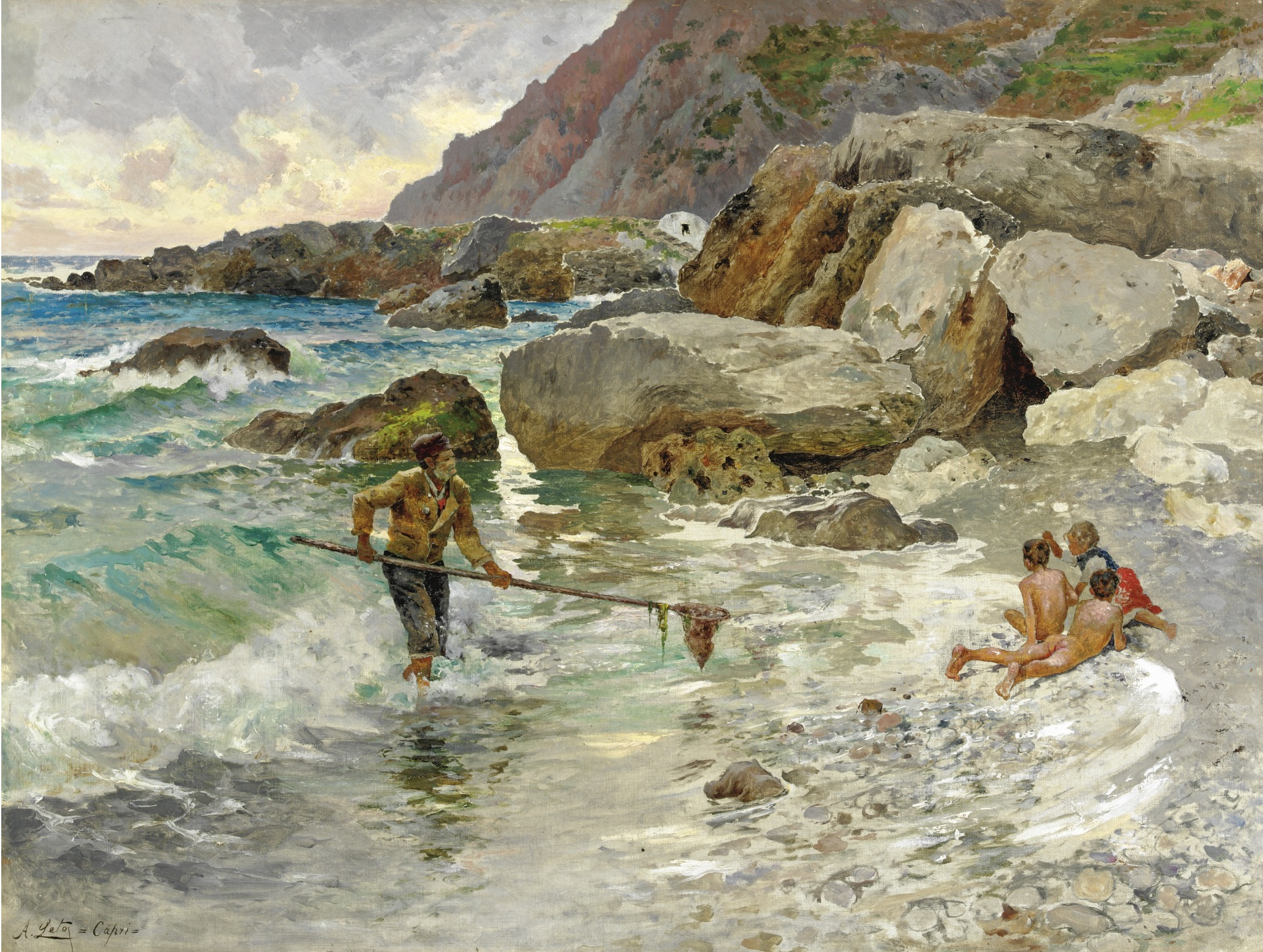
I figli del Mare

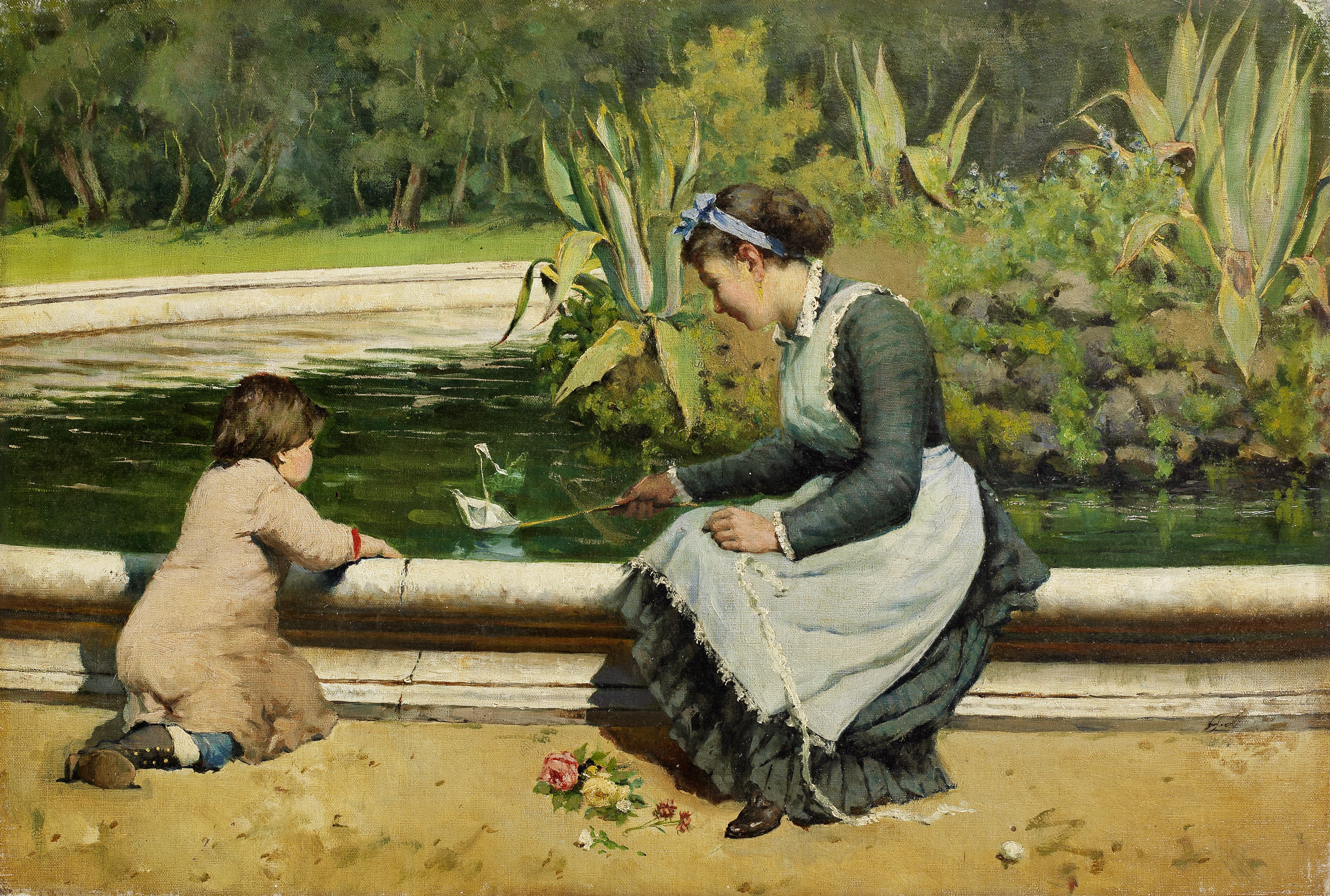
Il Gioco a Villa Tasca

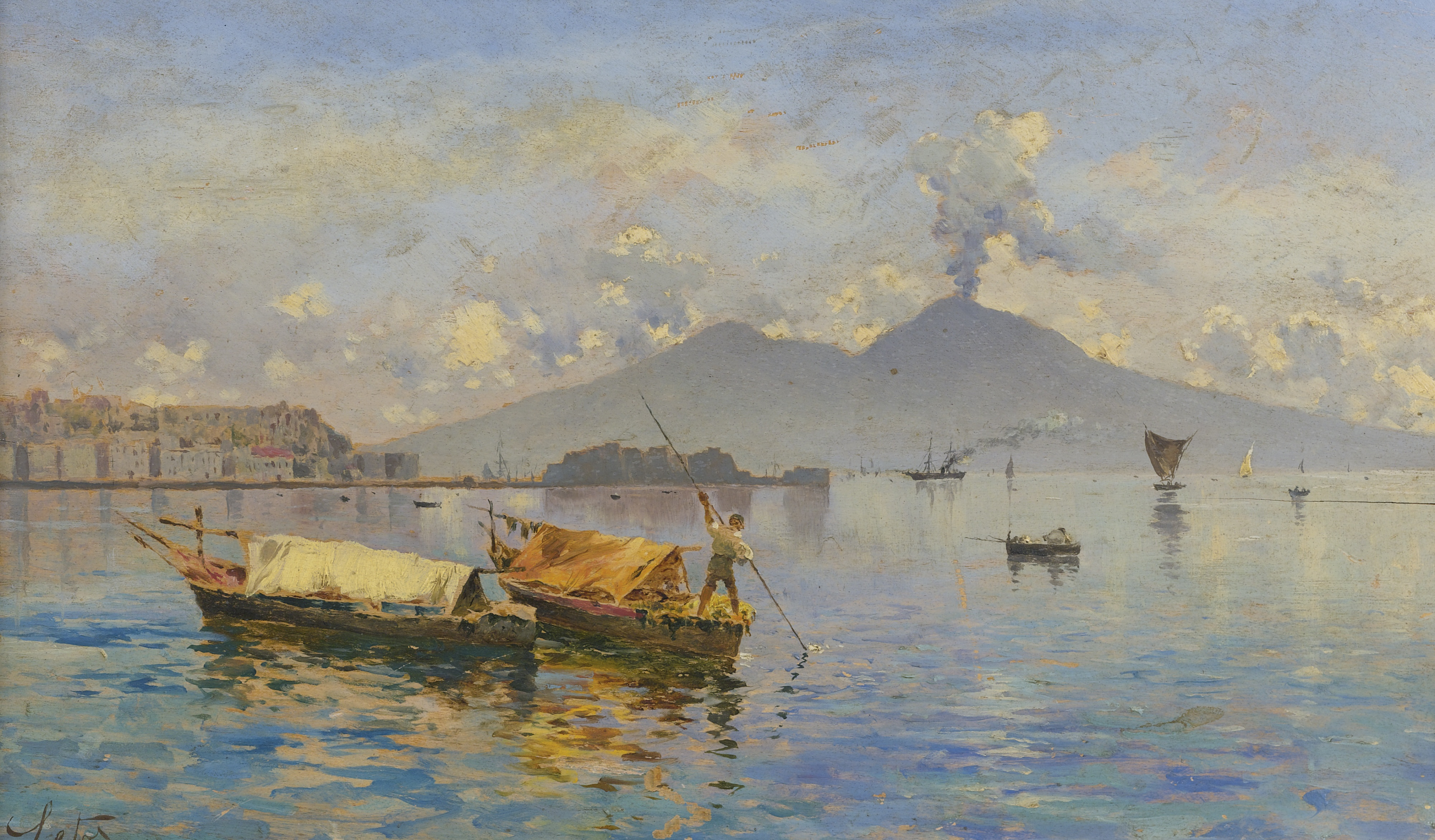
Vedute di Napoli

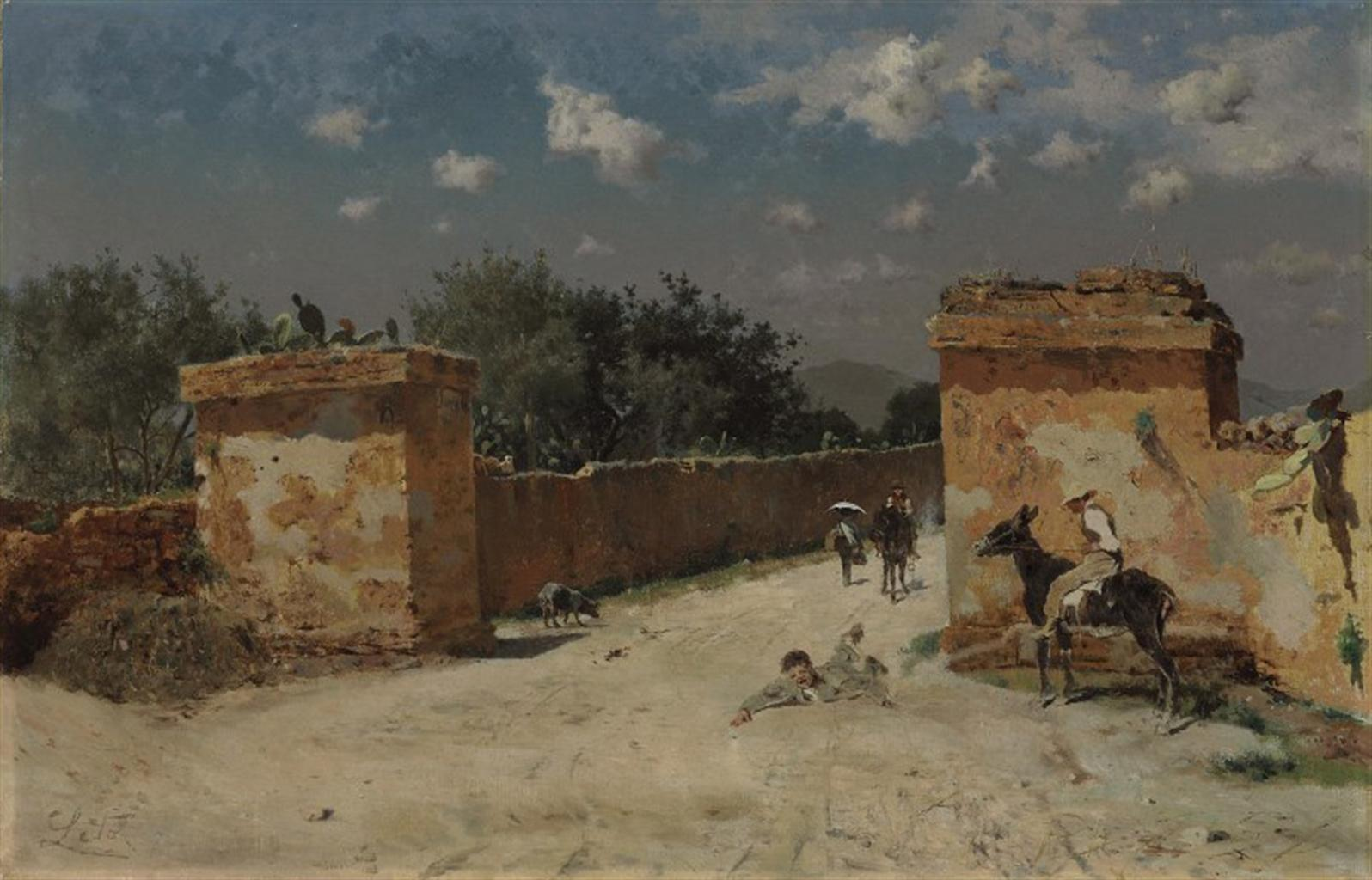
A Mid-day Incident (1876)

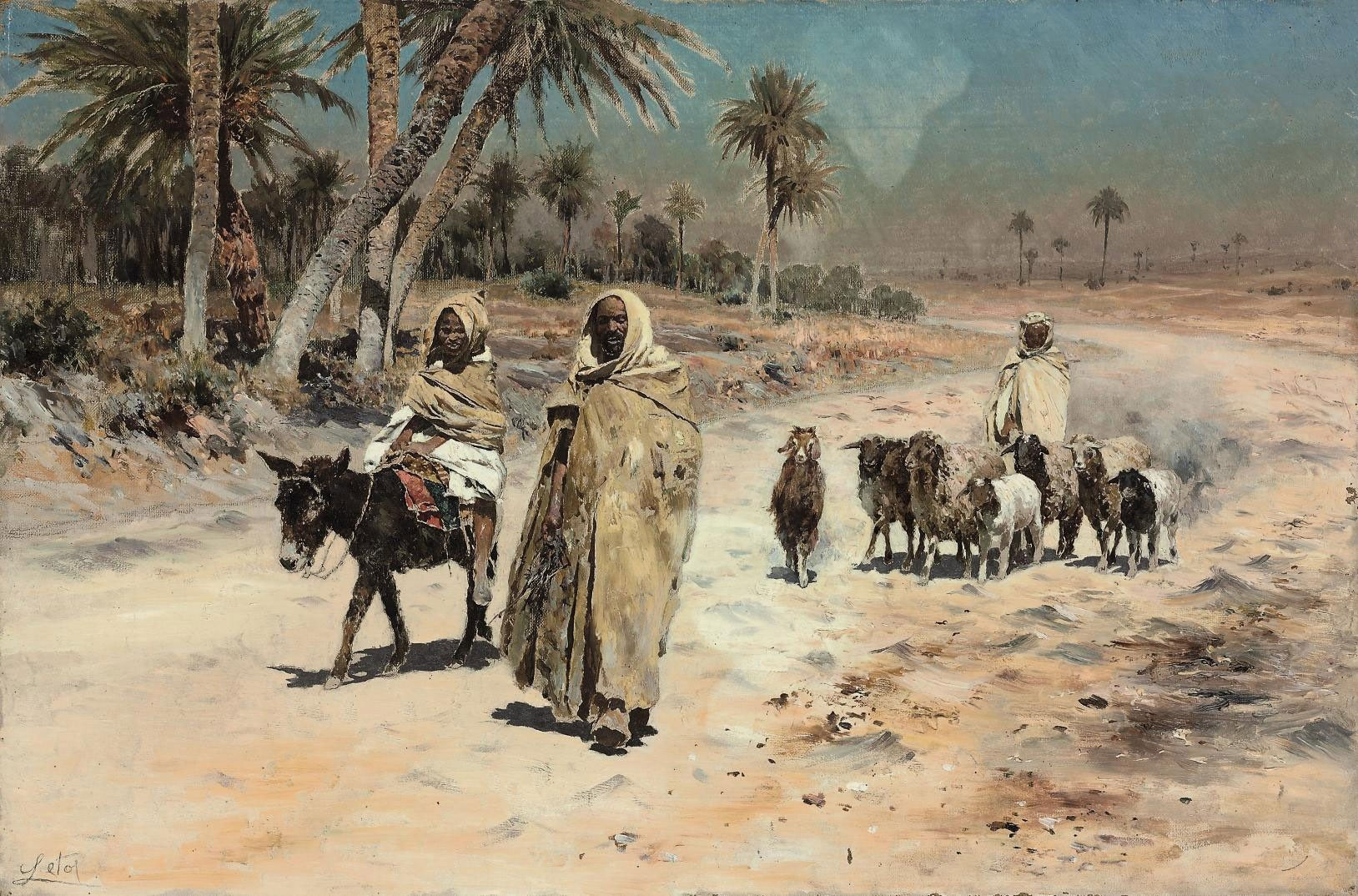
Arab sheep herders

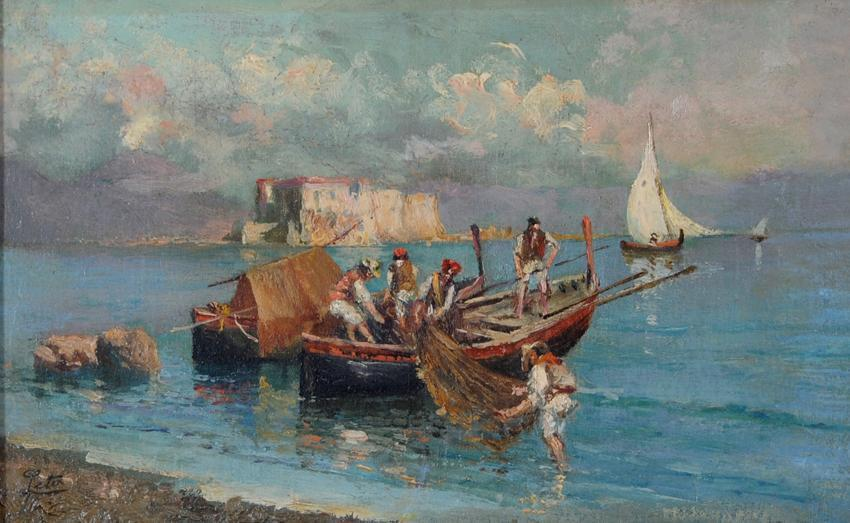
Barca di Pescatori sullo sfondo di Castel Dell'Ovo
