= Giovanni Ponticelli =

Italian painter

Giovanni Ponticelli (Naples, c. 1829–1880) was an Italian painter.

He was a resident of Naples. In 1877 he exhibited the two canvases: Il vizioso and La casa del rigattiere. In 1872 at Milan, he exhibited The people of Andria fight the Papal forces captained by cardinal Vitelli.

He studied in the Academy of Fine Arts in Naples, where he was taught by Filippo Palizzi. At the Mostra Borbonica of 1855, he displayed Parable of the ten virgins, Great Mother of God, Blessed Virgin with Child and St Joseph), and in 1859, displayed St Elisabeth, Queen of Hungary visits a hovel.

After 1860, his paintings took on a more patriotic tone, including A wounded garibaldino explains his feats to two young women, exhibited at the 1861 National Exposition of Florence. He did work alongside painters of the School of Resina. At the Promotrice of Naples in 1862, he exhibited Una confidenza d'amore. Among his historic and genre subjects are La convalescenza del Cavaliere Baiardo (1867); Entry of Cardinal Ruffo into Naples in 1799, La sparata del vino nuovo.

Ponticelli painted the sipario (curtain) of the Theater of Corato depicting the Disfida di Barletta (Challenge of Barletta). He also painted these curtains in Salerno and Chieti (1875). The latter was painted with the Triumph of Gaius Asinius Pollio was painted with Ponticelli's pupil, Ciro Punzi .

== Gallery ==
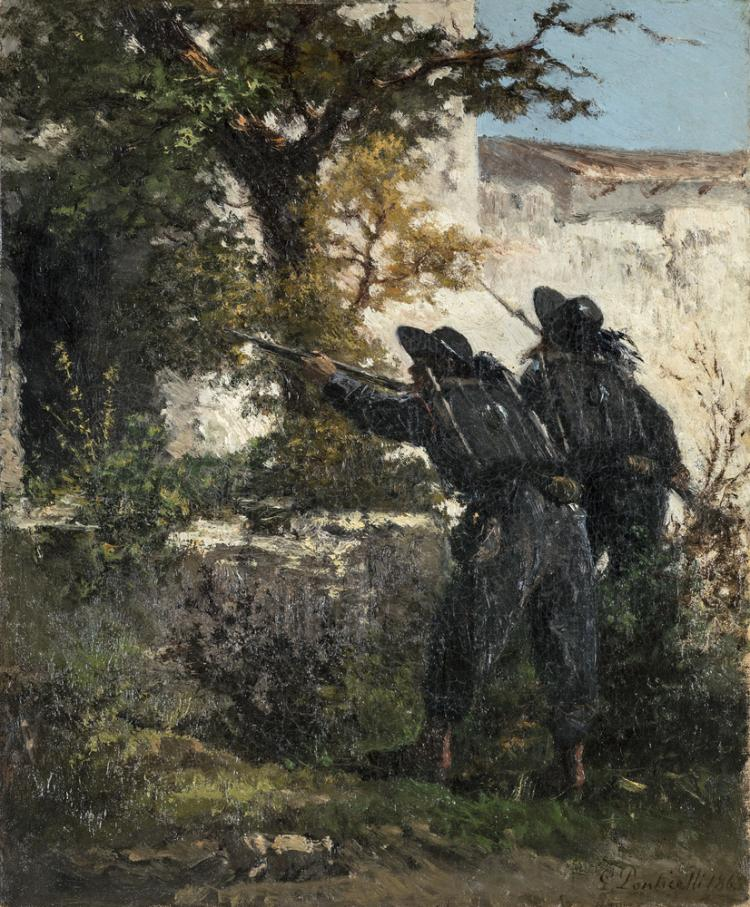
Two soldiers in combat, oil on canvas, 30 cm x 31 cm, 1868.

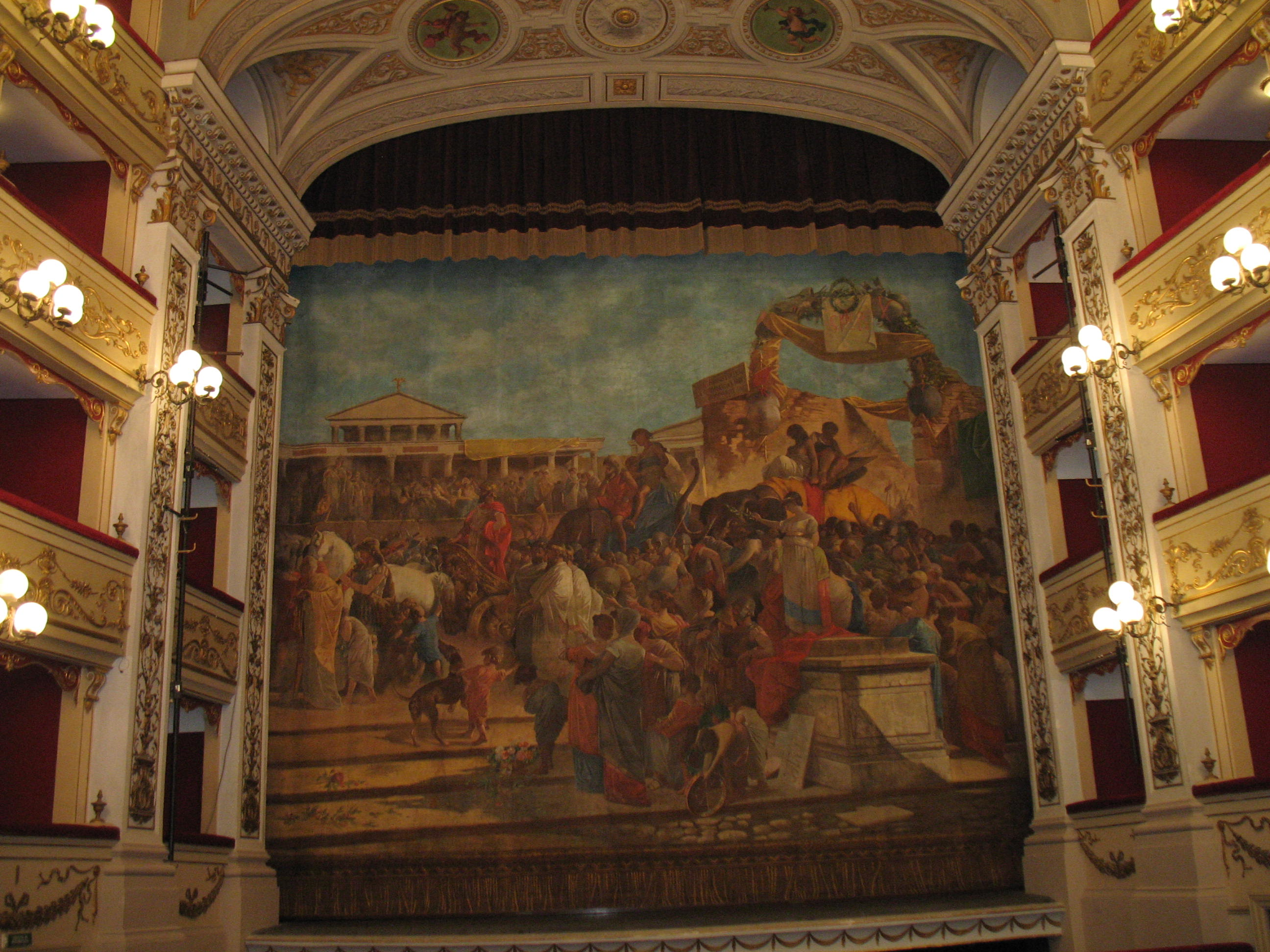
Curtain representing the Triumph of Gaius Asinius Pollio, stage of the Teatro Marrucino in Chieti, 1875.

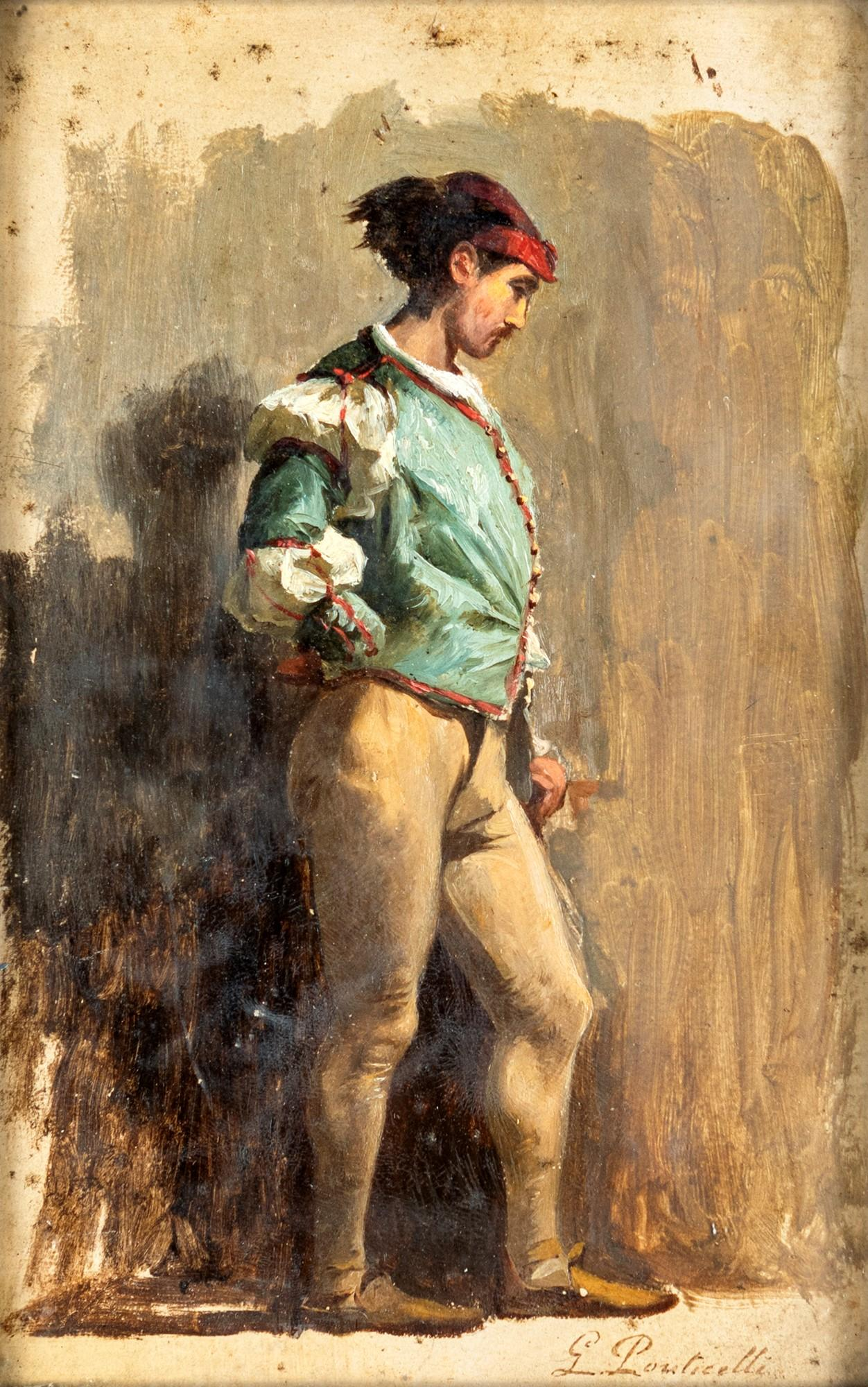
Paggio (Page) wearing a green vest, oil on paper, 26 cm x 16 cm, date (?).

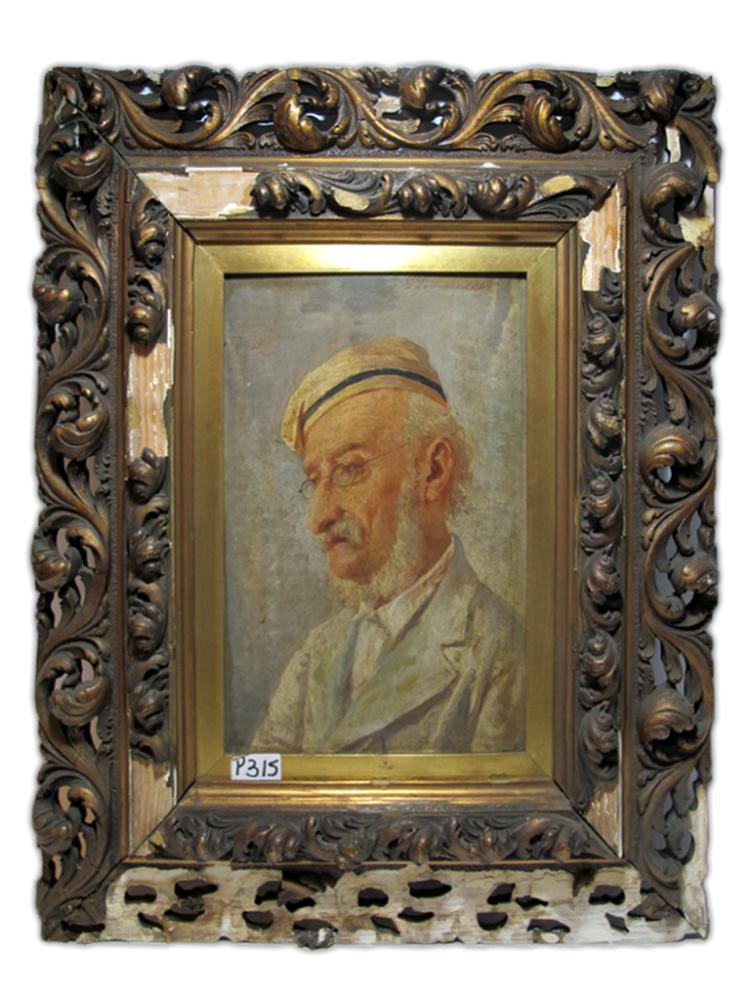
Portrait of an elderly man attributed to Giovanni Ponticelli.
