= Adriano Cecioni =

Italian painter

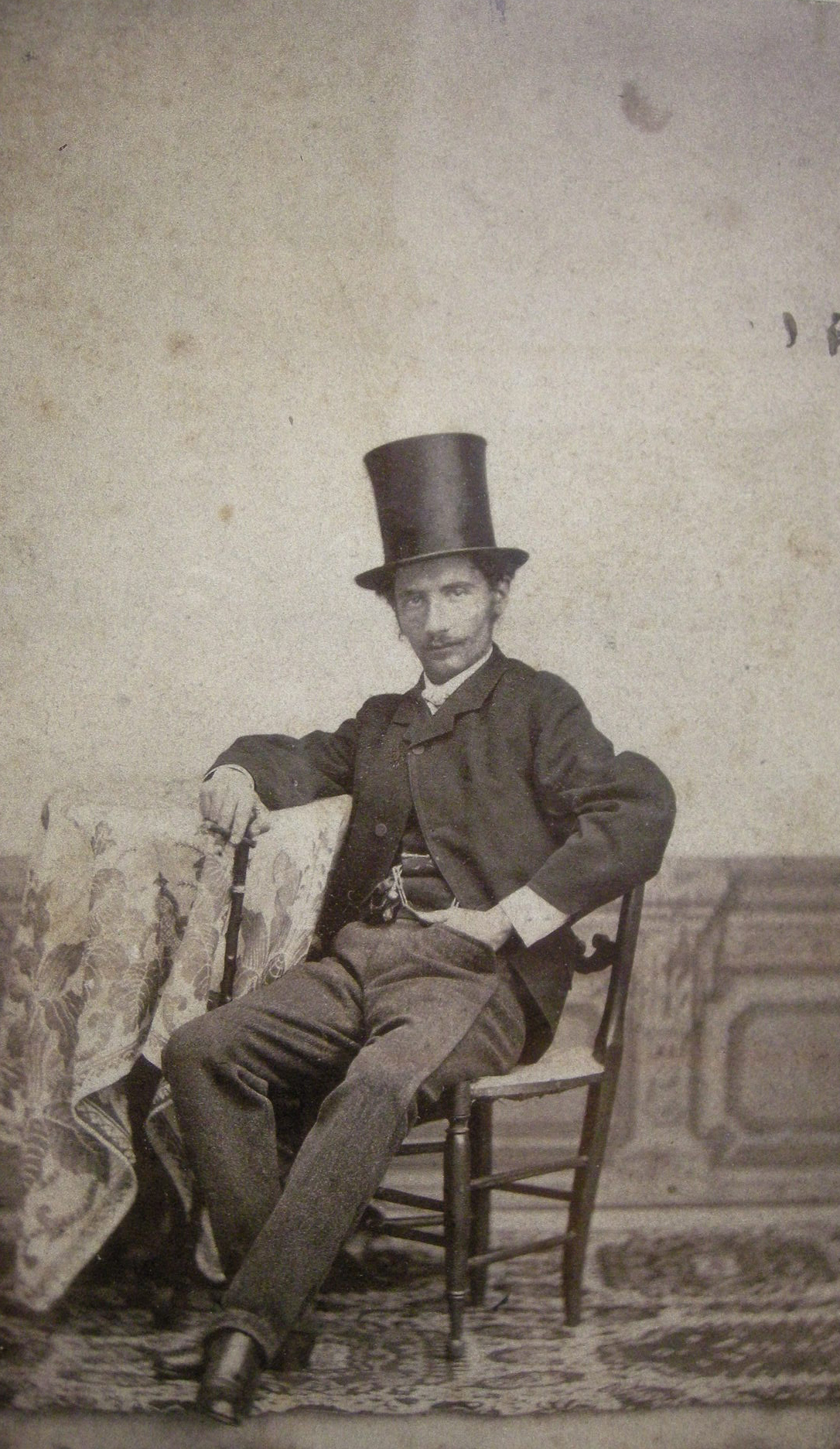
Adriano Cecioni

Adriano Cecioni (July 26, 1836 – May 23, 1886) was an Italian artist, caricaturist, and critic associated with the Macchiaioli group.

== Biography ==
He was born in Florence into a middle-class family belonging to the local gentry. He began his artistic training in 1859 at the Florentine Academy under the sculptor Aristodemo Costoli. In that same year he fought alongside Telemaco Signorini in the Second Italian War of Independence. In 1860 he participated in a competition to provide military artworks for the Tuscan government. His submission, a maquette for a statue of Charles Albert of Savoy, won a prize but was deemed unsatisfactory by academicians and was not commissioned.

In 1863 Cecioni received a grant and went to Naples, where he was instrumental in the formation of the artists' group Scuola di Resina, which included Giuseppe De Nittis, Marco de Gregorio, and Federico Rossano. A major work of this period was his sculpture The Suicide, which he exhibited at the Florence Academy in 1867. In 1872 Cecioni spent six months in London, where he contributed a series of caricatures to Vanity Fair magazine. After he returned to Italy, the sculptures he produced for the rest of his career were mainly genre works, often humorous in nature. He also painted domestic scenes. In 1884 he became Professor of Drawing at the Istituto di Magistero Femminile.

Cecioni's activities as an art critic, which began in the 1870s, consumed an increasing amount of his time in his later years. He died of a heart attack on May 23, 1886.

His works are in collections including Galleria d'arte moderna di Palazzo Pitti, Florence; Galleria nazionale d'arte moderna, Rome; Museo statale d'arte medievale e moderna, Arezzo; and Pinacoteca di Brera, Milan.

His writings were anthologized in Scritti e ricordi (1905).

== Gallery ==
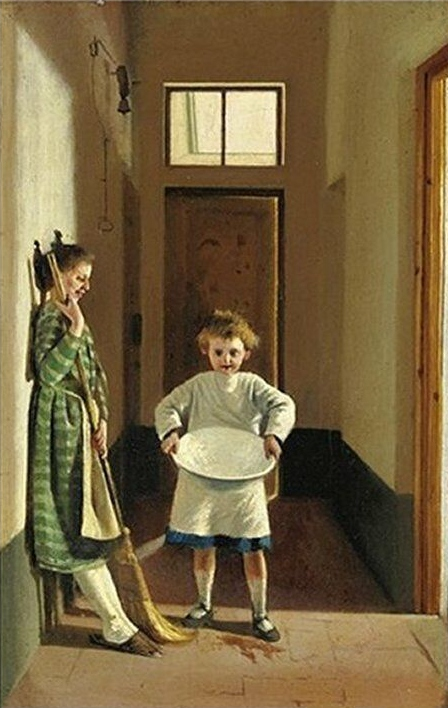
Housework, 1869

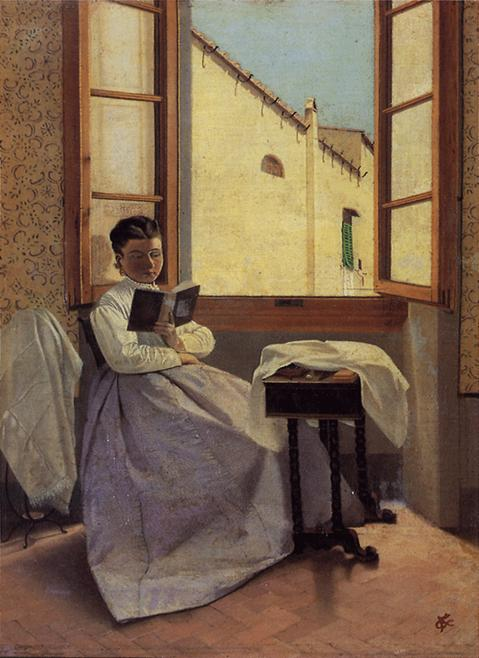
Aunt Erminia, ca. 1867/70

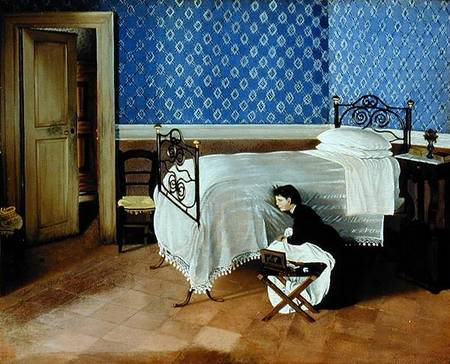
Interior with a Figure, 1868

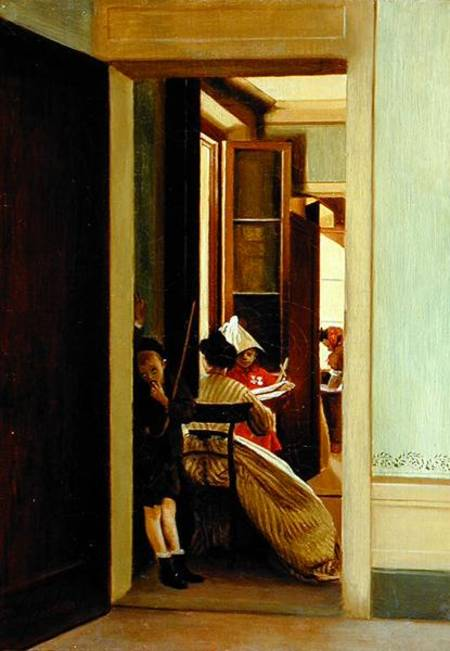
The Interrupted Game (1863/67)

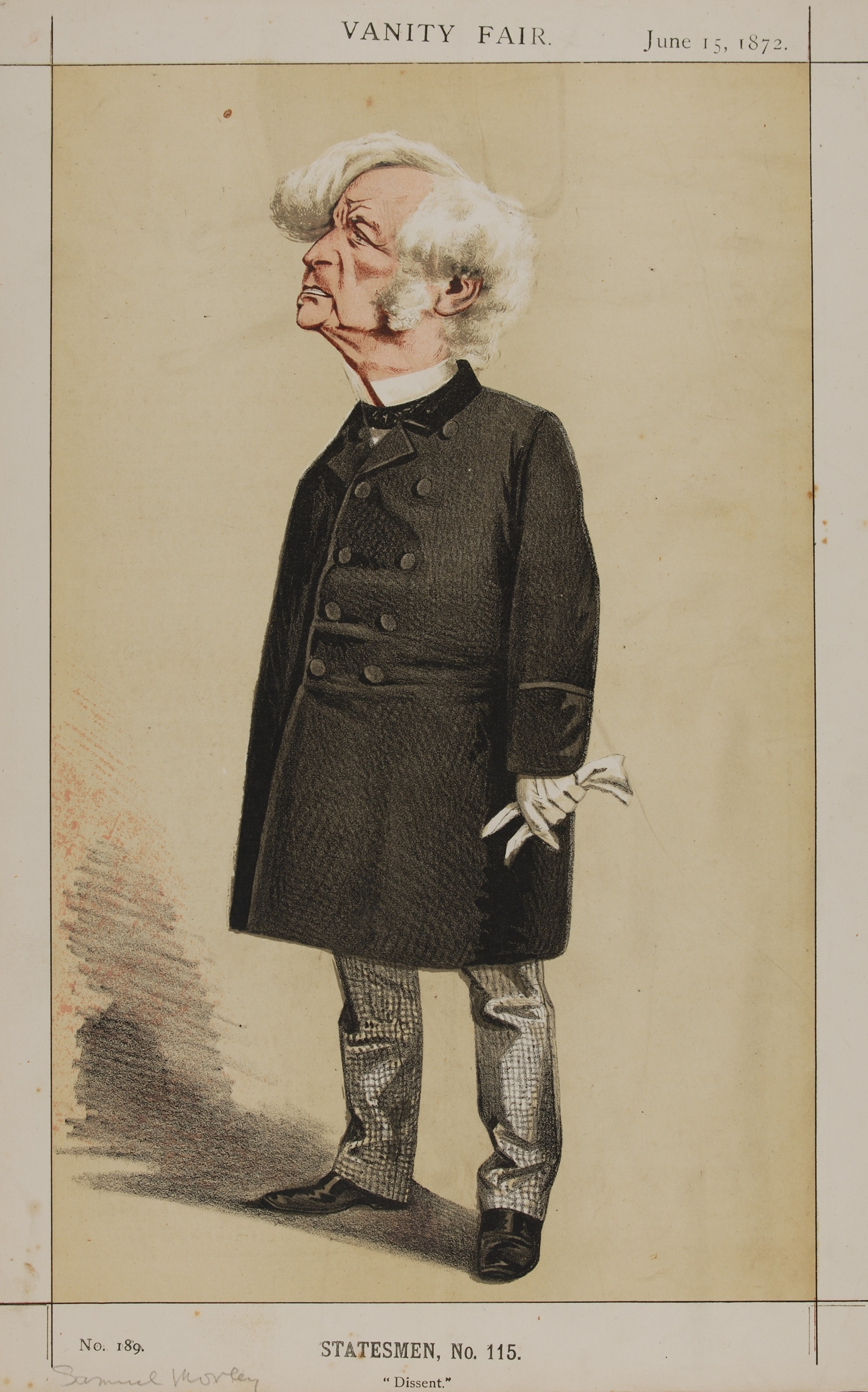
Samuel Morley. Caricature published in Vanity Fair, 1872
