= Eduardo Dalbono =

Italian painter (1841–1915)

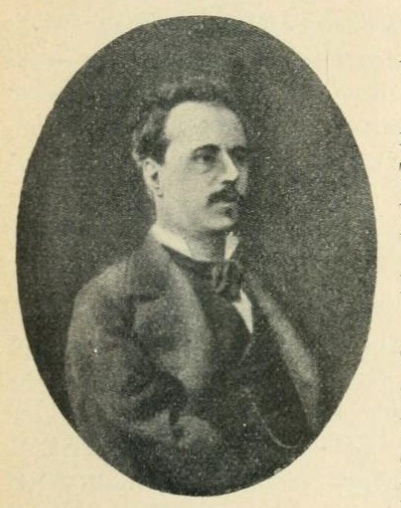
- Born: 10 December 1841; Naples, Kingdom of the Two Sicilies
- Died: 23 August 1915 (aged 73); Naples, Kingdom of Italy
- Known for: Painting
- Movement: School of Posillipo

Eduardo Dalbono (10 December 1841 – 23 August 1915) was an Italian painter, active in the Neapolitan artistic milieu of the second half of the nineteenth century. He is known above all for views, seascapes, fantastic subjects and scenes connected with the myth of Naples and Parthenope.

== Biography ==
Eduardo Dalbono, also referred to as Edoardo, was born in Naples on 10 December 1841 to Carlo Tito Dalbono, a writer and art critic, and Virginia Carelli, also recorded as Gatelli in some sources. His uncle Cesare Dalbono also belonged to the Neapolitan literary and critical milieu. His family introduced him early to the study of Romantic literature, music, ancient history and Neapolitan folklore, elements that remained central to his artistic imagination.

During a stay in Rome, in 1850, he took drawing lessons from the engraver Luigi Marchetti. After returning to Naples, he studied with the painter Beniamino De Lia and with Nicola Palizzi, in their respective private studios. His training developed in the Neapolitan artistic environment of the second half of the nineteenth century, in relation to landscape painting, the tradition of the School of Posillipo, the Neapolitan Verist movement and the experience of the School of Resina. He was close to the artistic context in which Giuseppe Mancinelli, Domenico Morelli and Filippo Palizzi also worked, and he received private lessons from Palizzi.

His earliest known works show a broad cultural formation. In 1859 he exhibited at the Exhibition of Fine Arts in Naples a composed landscape, Saint Louis King of France, having stopped under an oak tree, renders justice to a family that reverently appeals to him, awarded in 1861 with a second-class silver medal and now untraced. At the same exhibition he also presented Study of a Mill, evidence of his youthful interest in landscape and in the Neapolitan tradition linked to Giacinto Gigante.

He painted views with Vesuvius and the family group On the Terrace, in which the urban landscape, represented by the rooftops of Naples, enters the construction of a domestic scene. In the 1860s Dalbono also approached history painting. Around 1866 he took part in a competition with the canvas Excommunication of King Manfred, later exhibited at the Società Promotrice di Belle Arti in Naples in 1868 and at the National Exhibition of Fine Arts in Parma in 1870, where it obtained the gold medal.

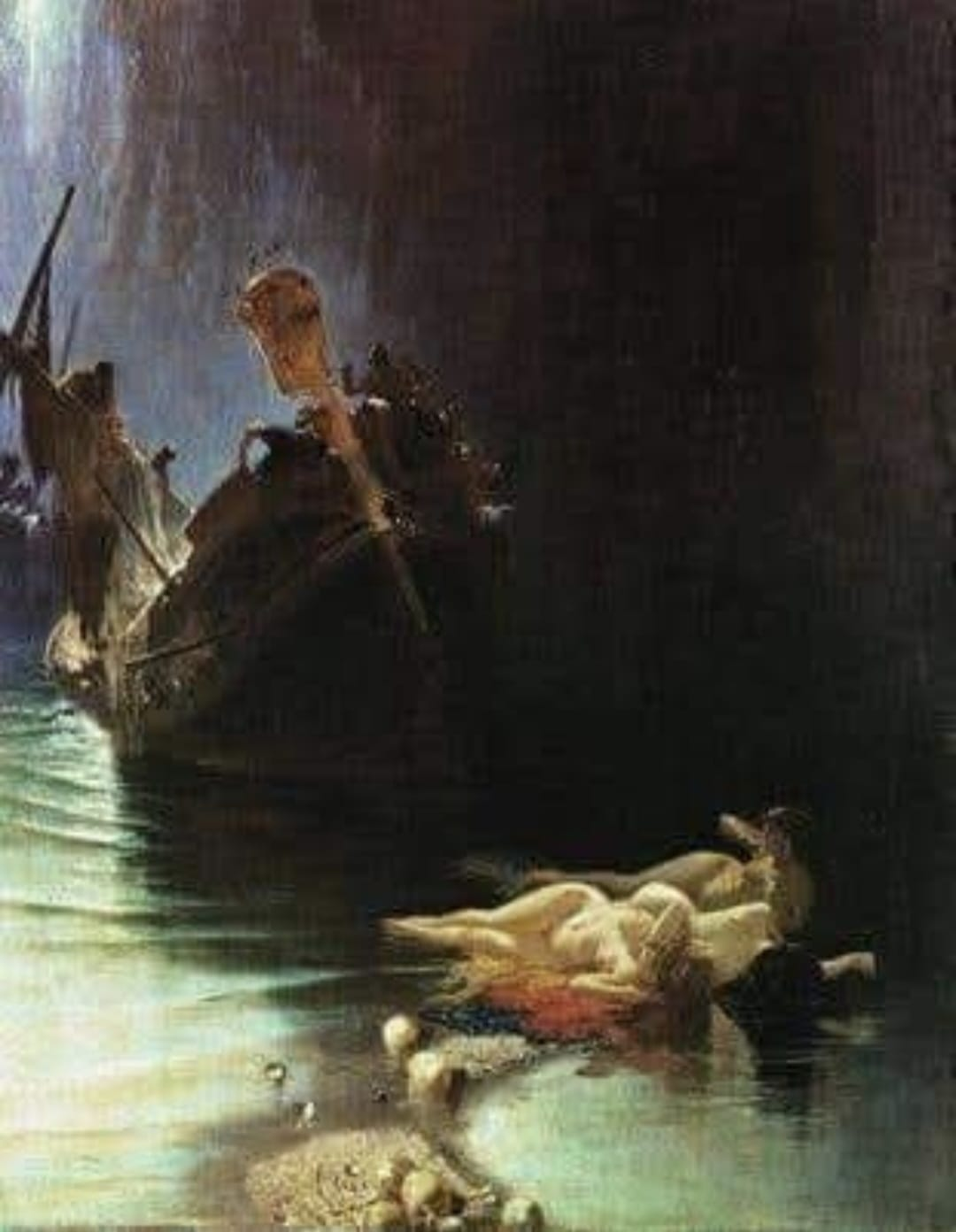
Eduardo Dalbono, La leggenda della Sirena, also known as The Myth of Parthenope or The Legend of the Sirens, 1871, oil on canvas, Gallery of the Academy of Fine Arts of Naples.

In 1871 he exhibited at the Società Promotrice di Belle Arti in Naples La leggenda della Sirena, also known as The Myth of Parthenope or The Legend of the Sirens, one of his most celebrated works.

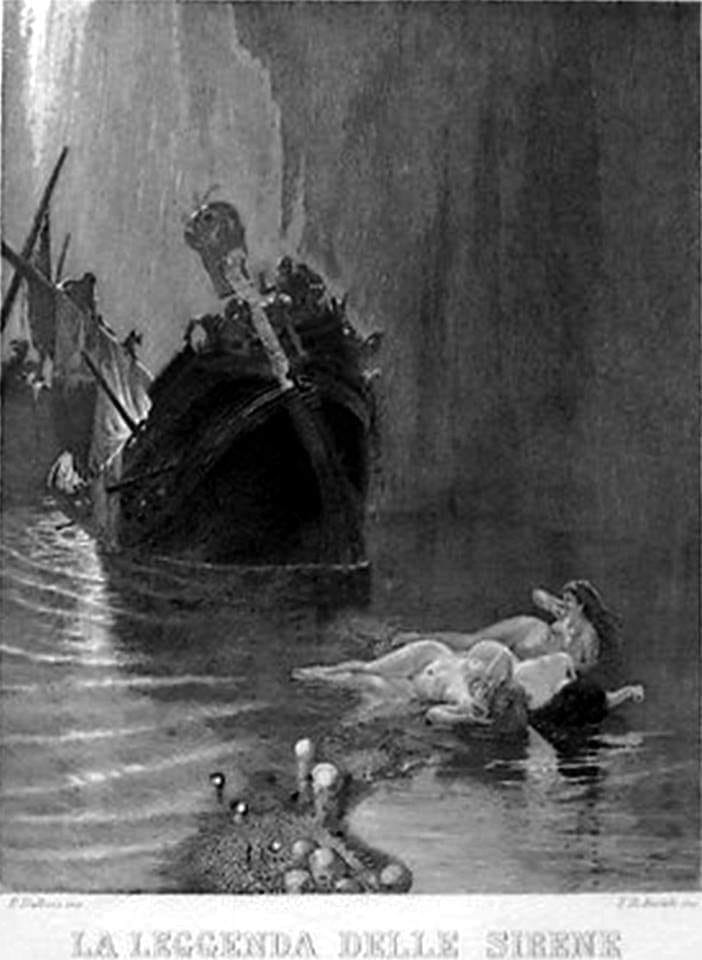
Francesco Di Bartolo after Eduardo Dalbono, The Legend of the Sirens, etching, Naples, 1871, private collection.

In the same year the engraver Francesco Di Bartolo made from the painting an etching intended for the members of the Promotrice; the print, dated Naples 1871, documents the relationship between Dalbono's painting, the graphic circulation of exhibited works and the artistic environment of the Neapolitan Promotrice. Francesco Di Bartolo's etching after the painting is also documented in the collections of the British Museum, where the sheet is catalogued with Di Bartolo as printmaker and Dalbono as the artist after whom the work was made.

The painting was later exhibited in 1872 in Milan and in 1873 at the Universal Exposition in Vienna, where it obtained the bronze medal.

The relationship with Francesco Di Bartolo also belongs to the broader context of Neapolitan illustration and publishing. Some sketches by Eduardo Dalbono intended for Di Bartolo can be connected with the editorial project of Usi e costumi di Napoli e contorni by Francesco de Bourcard, a work to which Carlo Tito Dalbono, the artist's father, also contributed; however, it does not appear that those drawings were later translated into engravings by Di Bartolo. The sheets are now preserved in a private collection.

Giuseppe De Nittis introduced Dalbono to the French art dealer Adolphe Goupil. Dalbono worked for Goupil with alternating stays in Paris and Naples, especially between 1878 and 1882. This context also includes the commercial success of works such as The Vow to the Madonna del Carmine, from which Goupil had an engraving made by Varin and which initiated a series of replicas and variants connected with Neapolitan folklore, the sea and popular life.

Alongside easel painting, Dalbono carried out intense decorative activity. He executed decorations, now lost, for Neapolitan villas and palaces and wall temperas for the municipal theatre of Salerno, with symbols of the four parts of the world. He also painted altarpieces for the church of Santa Maria di Piedigrotta in Naples and for a church in Gragnano.

His activity as an illustrator was also important. He contributed drawings to L'Illustrazione Italiana, published in Milan by the Treves brothers, and to the Parisian magazine Le Grand monde. For Treves he also illustrated children's books and works on Neapolitan subjects, including Nel regno delle fate by Cordelia, Nonna Bianca by A. Berta and Napoli e i Napoletani by Carlo Del Balzo.

In 1897 he obtained the chair of painting at the Royal Institute of Fine Arts of Naples and had Roberto Carignani and Carlo Brancaccio among his pupils. From 1905 he held the post of curator of the picture gallery of the National Museum of Naples, corresponding to the present-day picture gallery of the National Museum of Capodimonte; in 1906 he was president of the commission for the reorganization of the picture gallery of Palazzo Farnese in Piacenza.

A series of Dalbono's lectures and articles was collected by Benedetto Croce together with some writings by Domenico Morelli in the volume La scuola napoletana di pittura nel secolo decimonono ed altri scritti d'arte, published by Laterza in 1915.

Dalbono died in Naples on 23 August 1915.

Naples, Rome, Brindisi, Portici and Quarto have named a street after Eduardo Dalbono.

== Works ==
Dalbono's production includes Neapolitan views, seascapes, historical and fantastic subjects, genre scenes, decorative works and works on paper. Among his known works are On the Terrace, Excommunication of King Manfred, La leggenda della Sirena or The Myth of Parthenope, Port of Venice, Fishermen at Posillipo near the Palazzo Donn'Anna, Lateen Sail, Rain of Ashes and the decorative temperas for the municipal theatre of Salerno.

=== Works in museums and public collections ===
- Galleria nazionale d'arte moderna e contemporanea in Rome: Port of Venice (1890), On the Terrace (1865–1867)
- Gallery of Modern Art of Verona: Street in Naples, oil on panel
- Galleria d'arte moderna Ricci Oddi in Piacenza: Lateen Sail
- Civic Museum of Barletta: Self-portrait (1870–1915), Nude Female Figure, works on paper
- Museo civico di Castel Nuovo in Naples: View of Via San Sebastiano in Naples (1861)
- Gallery of the Academy of Fine Arts of Naples: Landscape with Shepherd, La leggenda della Sirena (1871), Torre del Greco (drawing, 1896), Washerwomen at the Baths of Baia (watercolour), Rain of Ashes (tempera, 1906)
- National Museum of Capodimonte in Naples: Adelina e Eleonora
- National Museum of San Martino in Naples: Marina with Fishermen and Boats (1866)
- Museo Poldi Pezzoli in Milan: Female Figure, pencil on paper (1860–1861)
- São Paulo Museum of Art in São Paulo: Fishermen at Posillipo near the Palazzo Donn'Anna

== Gallery ==
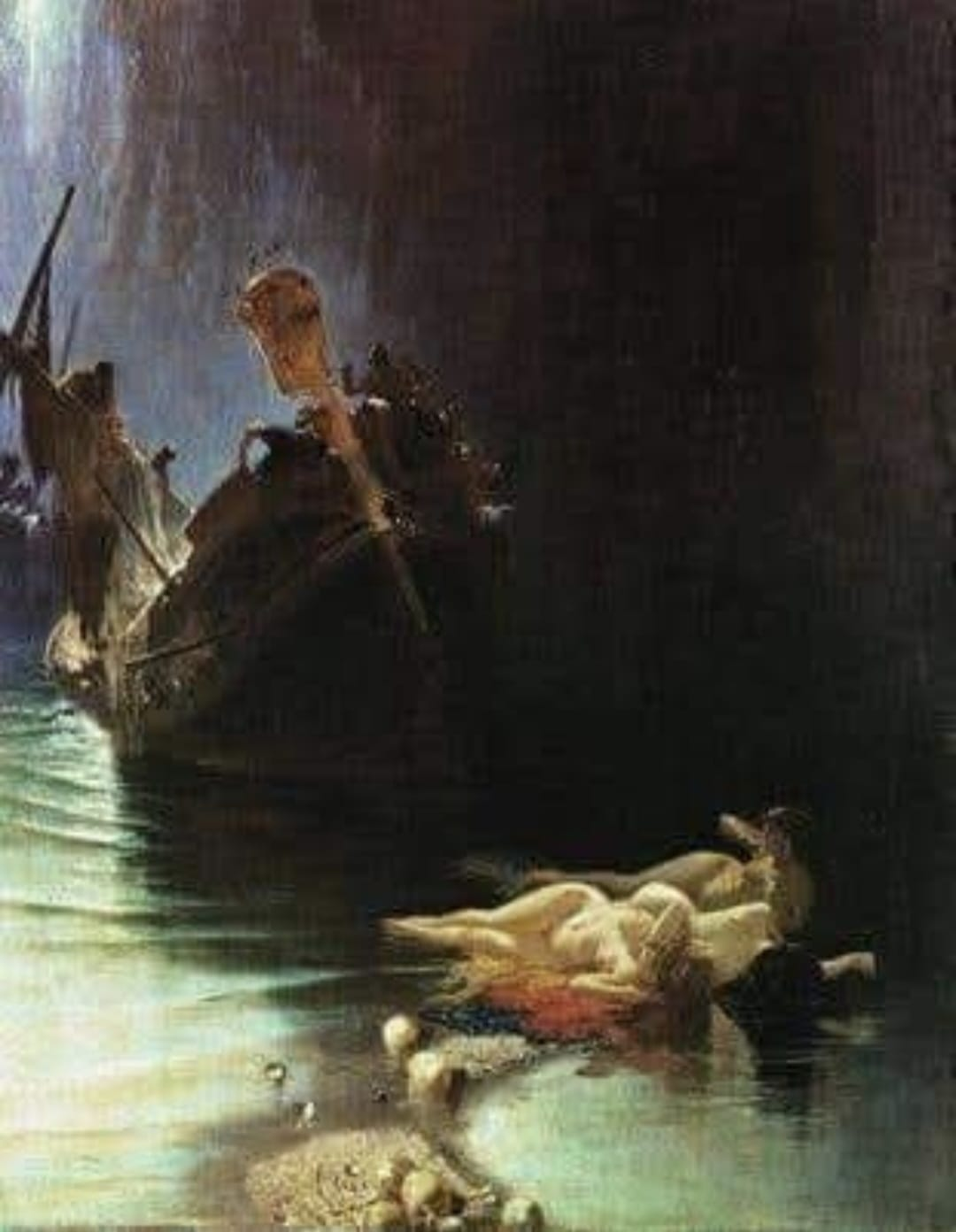
Eduardo Dalbono, La leggenda della Sirena, Gallery of the Academy of Fine Arts of Naples.

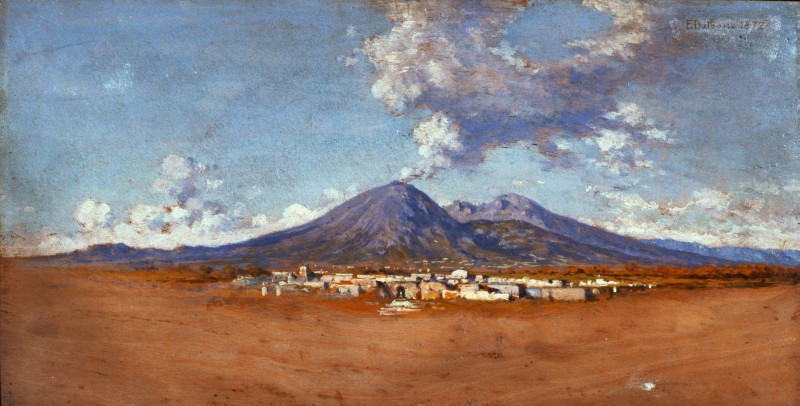
Study or Vesuvius, 1872, Fondazione Cariplo

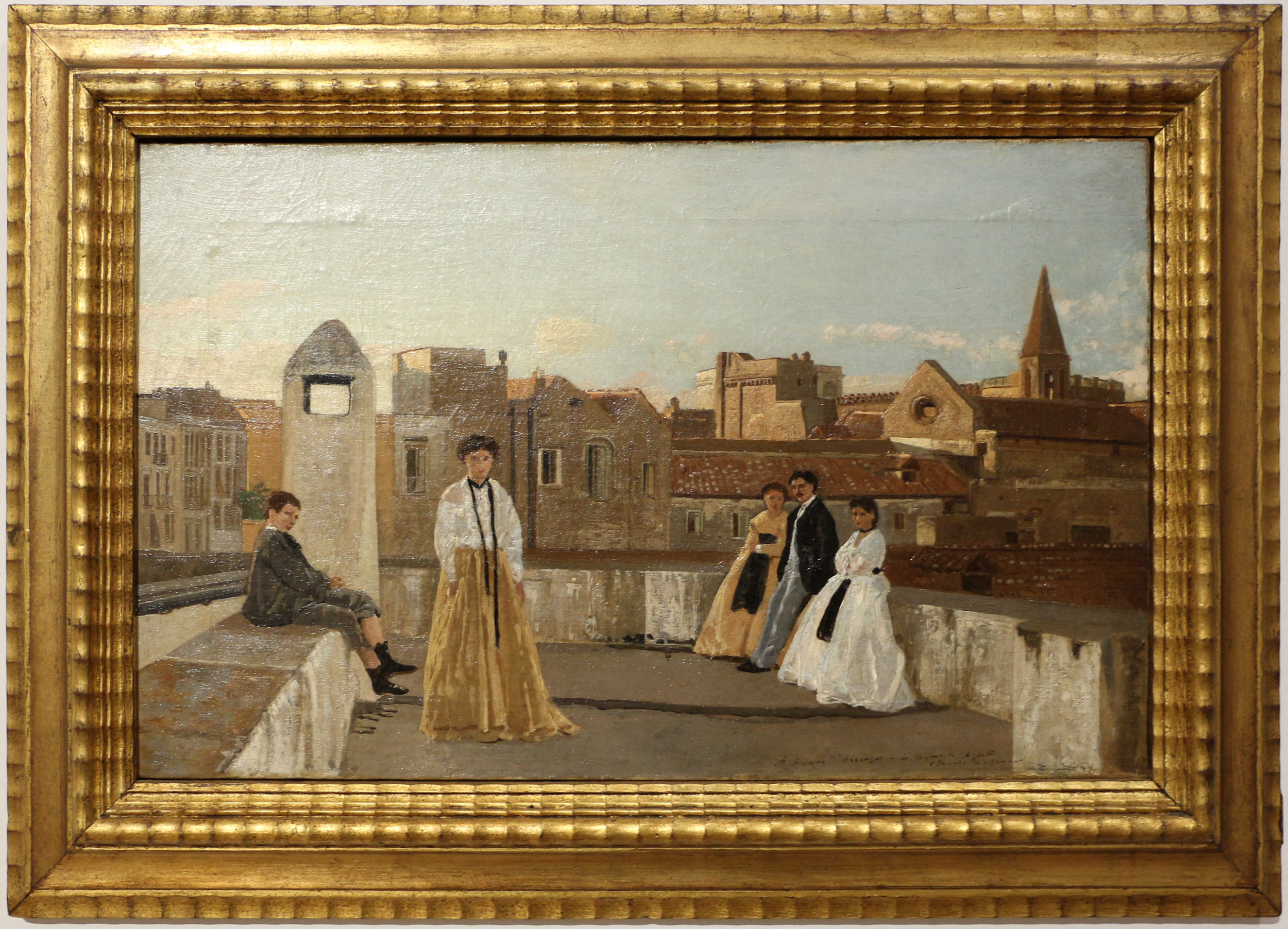
On the Terrace, 1865–1867, Galleria nazionale d'arte moderna e contemporanea

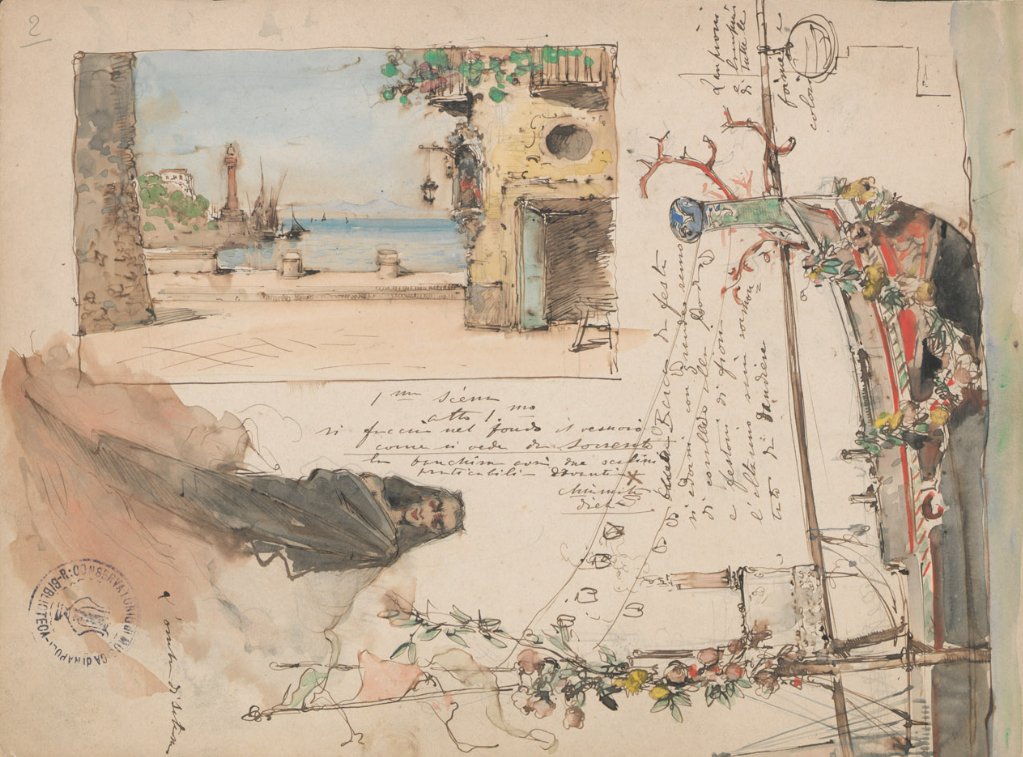
Drawings for La Figlia del Diavolo by Nicola D'Arienzo, Teatro Bellini, Naples, 16 November 1879

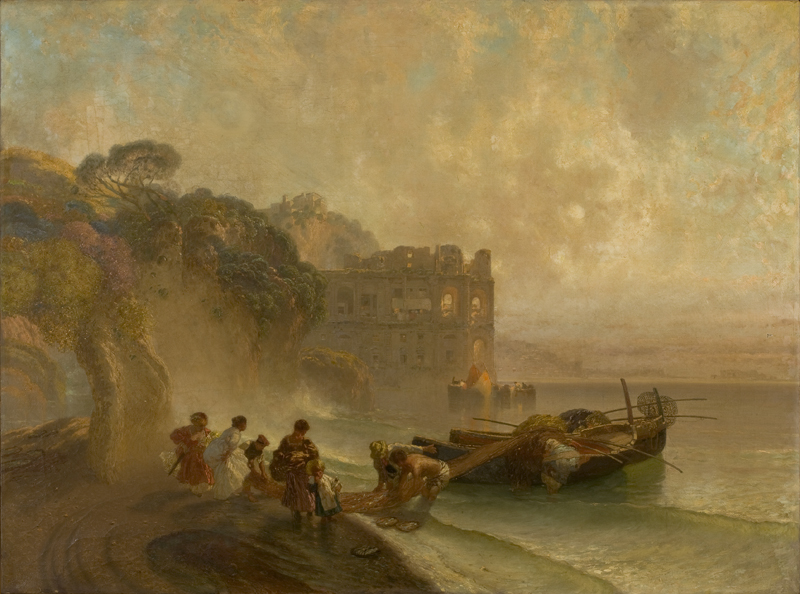
Fishermen at Posillipo near the Palazzo Donn'Anna, São Paulo Museum of Art

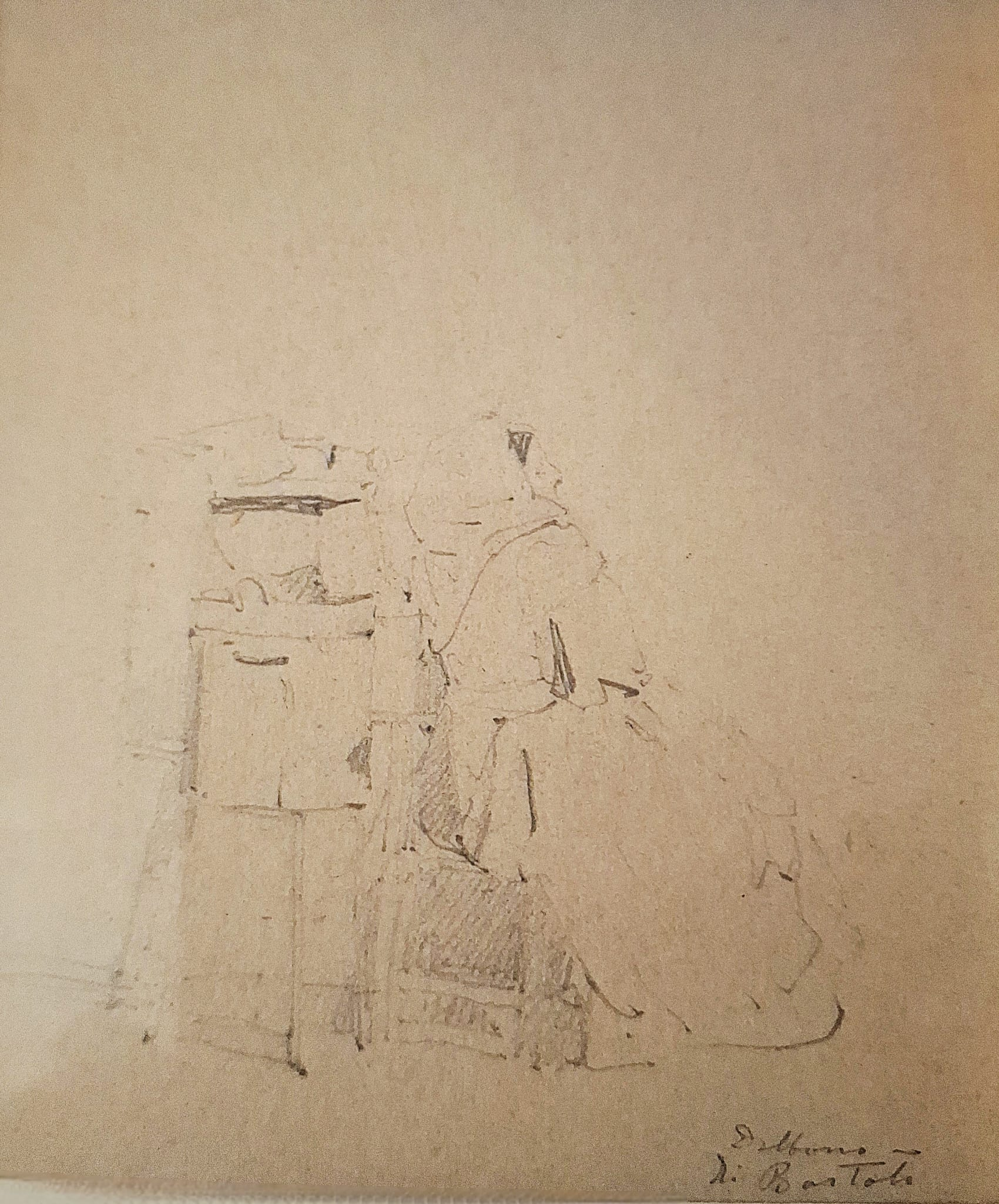
Eduardo Dalbono, Common Woman, pencil sketch, private collection.

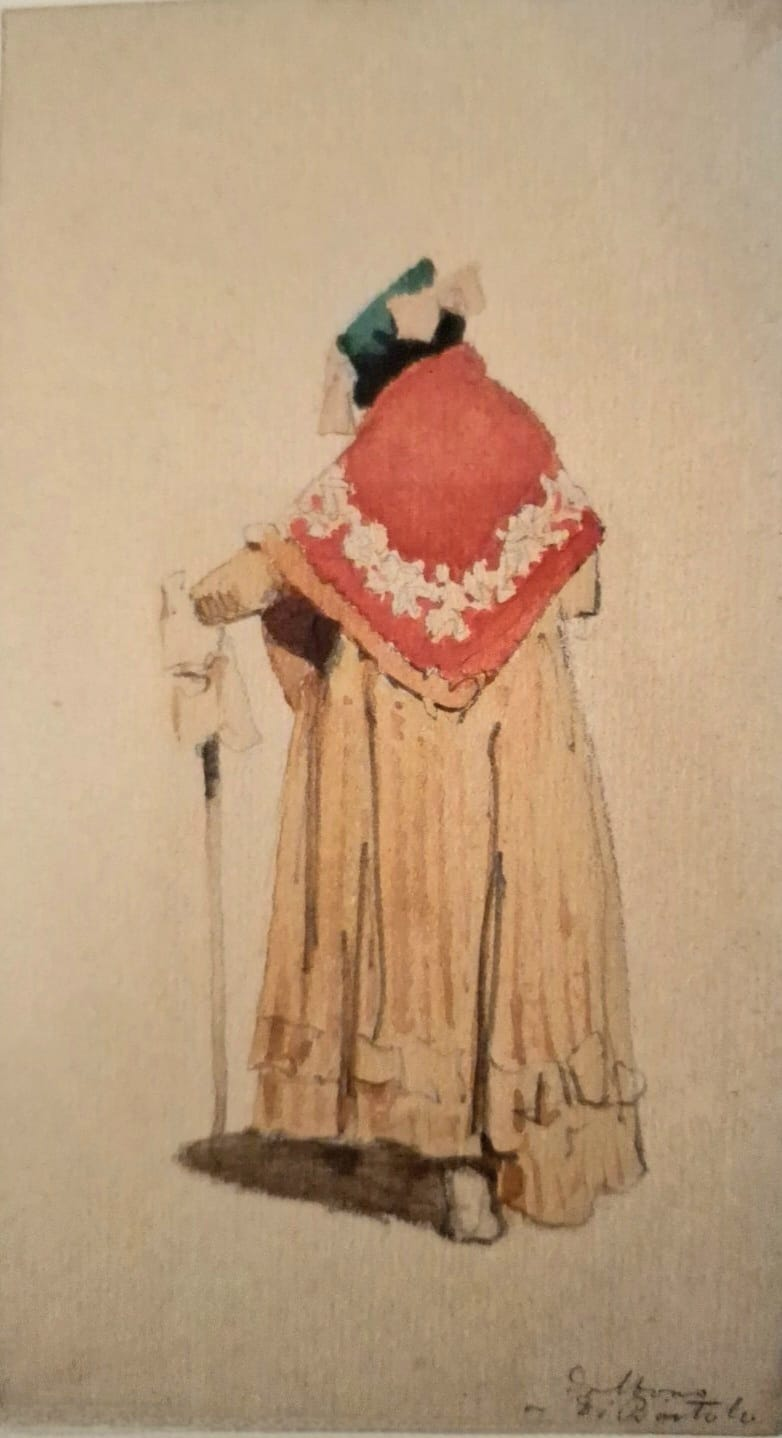
Eduardo Dalbono, Woman with Shawl, watercolour, private collection.

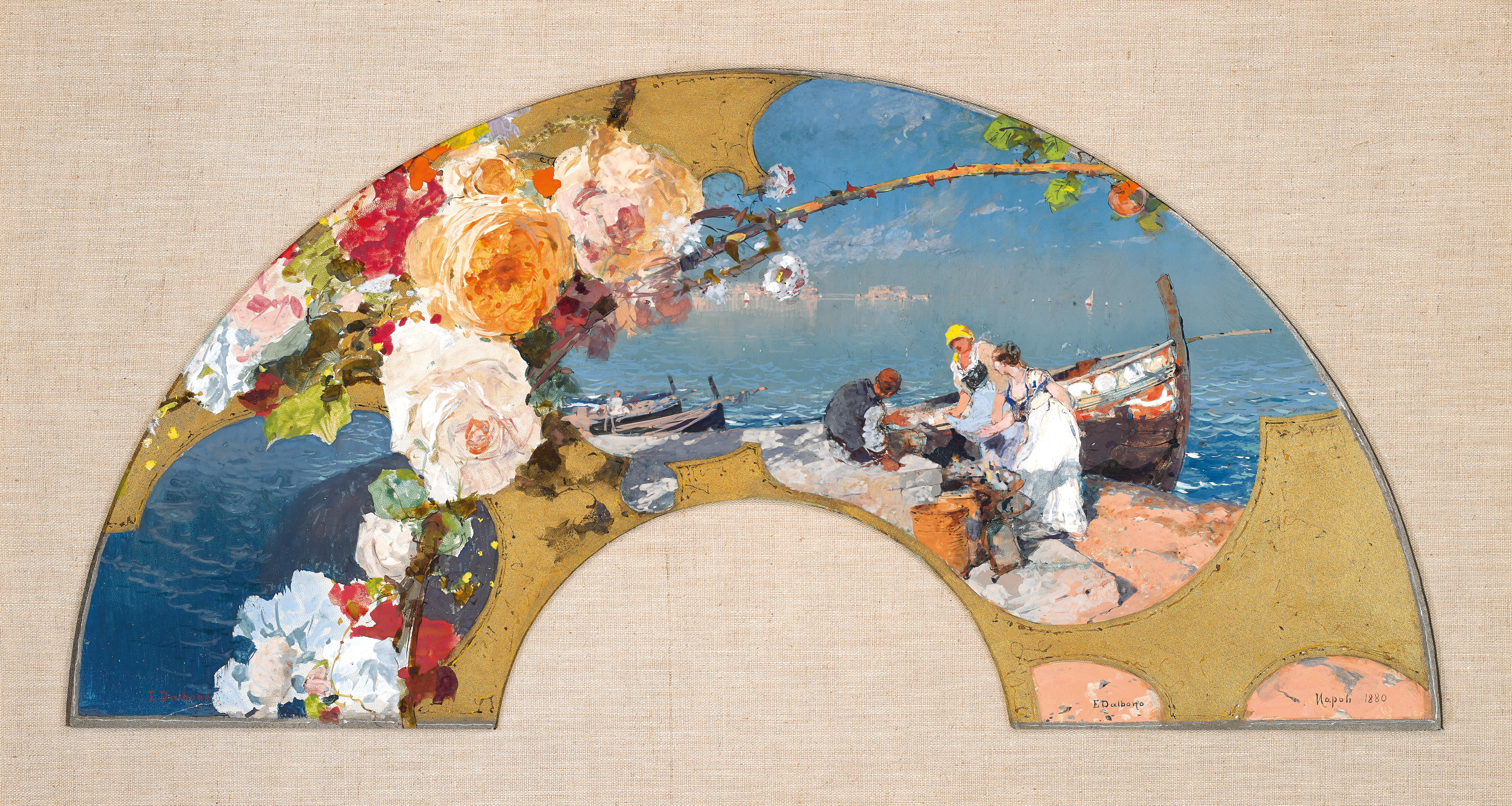
Naples Seen from Posillipo

== Bibliography ==
- Federigo Verdinois, I Dalbono, in Profili letterari napoletani, Morano, Naples, 1882, pp. 99–106.
- Vittorio Pica, Edoardo Dalbono illustratore, in Emporium, vol. XLIII, no. 257, 1916, pp. 323–342.
- A. Schettini, La Pittura napoletana dell'Ottocento, Editrice E.D.A.R.T., Naples, 1967.
- M. A. Pavone, Napoli scomparsa nei dipinti di fine Ottocento, Newton Compton Editori, Rome, 1987.
- Various authors, Capolavori dell'800 Napoletano, dal romanticismo al verismo, Mazzotta, Milan, 1997.
- Massimo Ricciardi, La costa d'Amalfi nella pittura dell'Ottocento, De Luca editore, Salerno, 1998.
- Nello and Saverio Ammendola, Ottocento-Novecento, due secoli di pittura a Napoli, with introduction and interview by M. Picone Petrusa, Electa Napoli, Naples, 1999.
- Achille della Ragione, Eduardo Dalbono: il pittore della luce, Naples, 2011.
- Isabella Valente, La scuola di Posillipo. La luce che conquistò il mondo, Mediterranea Edizioni, Naples, 2019. ISBN 978-88-94260-51-9.
- Silvestra Bietoletti, Michele Dantini, L'Ottocento italiano: la storia, gli artisti, le opere, Giunti, Florence, 2002.
- Natalia Di Bartolo, Francesco Di Bartolo (1826–1913), incisore e pittore: corpus fondante e corpus di saggi per il Bicentenario della nascita, OperaeOpera, 2026.
- Laura Casone, Eduardo Dalbono, online catalogue Artgate by Fondazione Cariplo, 2010.
