= Achille Talarico =

Italian painter

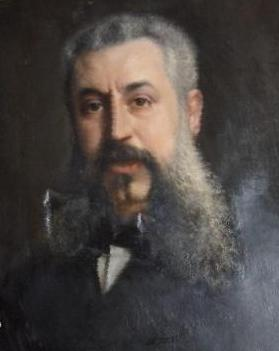
Achille Talarico (c.1890), by Giuseppe Castiglione

Achille Talarico (22 January 1837, Catanzaro - 24 March 1902, Naples) was an Italian painter of the Neapolitan School.

== Biography ==
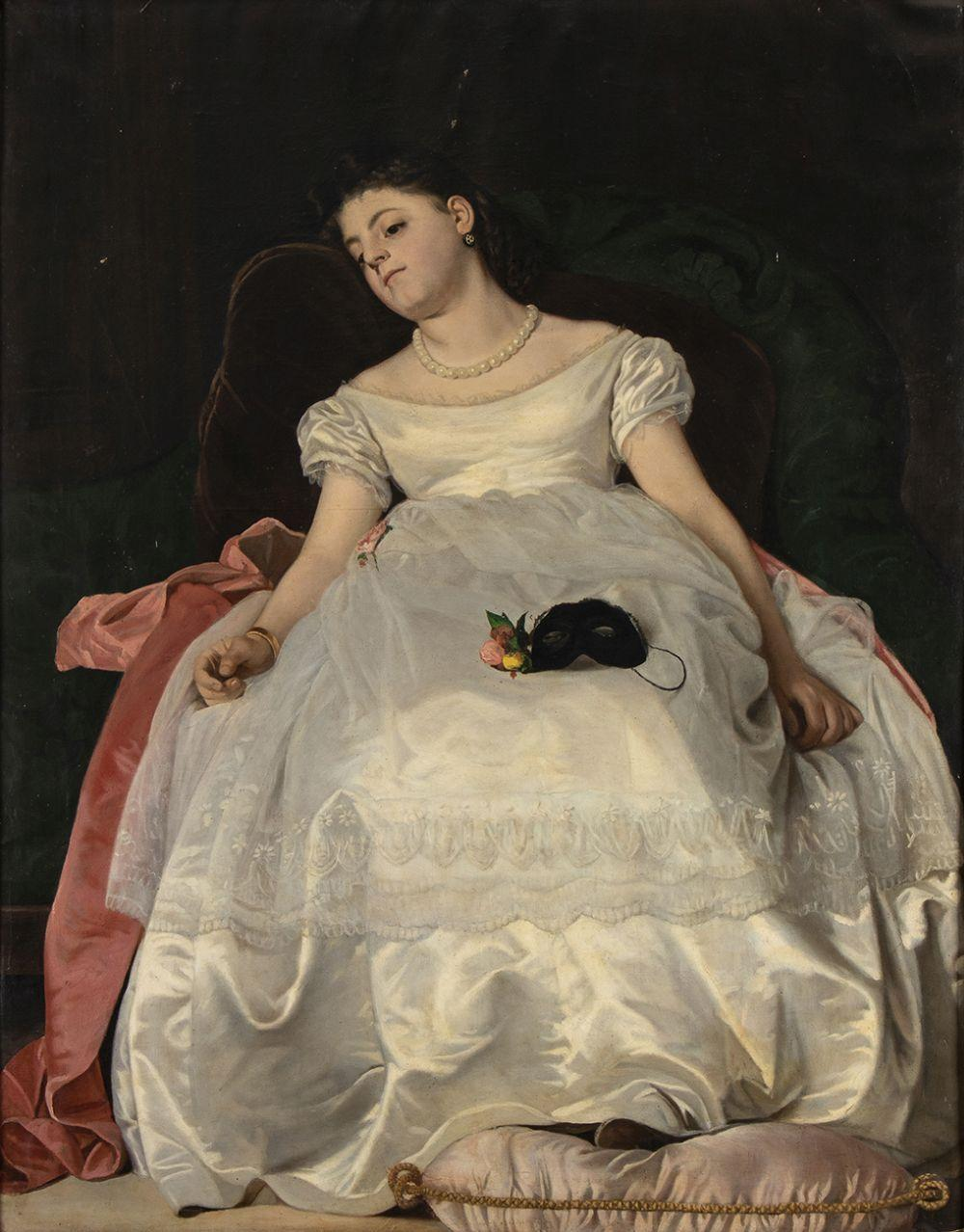
After the Ball

He was born to Antonio Talarico, a fruit merchant, and his wife Maria née Corrado. His studies began in Naples; first with Giuseppe Mancinelli, then at the Academy of Fine Arts with Domenico Morelli. His first work, Memories, was presented at the "Neapolitan Society for Promotion of the Fine Arts" in 1864. The following year, he had a showing in Milan. Over the next few years, he sold several of his paintings through the Society, including After the Ball, which was bought by the Museo di Capodimonte in 1867, and subsequently presented at numerous exhibitions.

In 1870, he was awarded a silver medal at the "National Exposition of Agriculture and Commerce" in Salerno. He also participated in the 1873 Vienna World's Fair. In 1882, he presented his paintings at the Pinacoteca di Brera in Milan. The following year, he had a showing in Rome. There, his works attracted the attention of the diplomat and journalist, Francesco De Renzis, who would mention them in his book, Conversazioni artistiche (1883). He also became friends with the writer, Vittorio Imbriani, who compared him to Edgar Degas.

Toward the end of the century, he was named an honorary Professor at the Accademia in Naples, and was decorated with the Order of the Crown of Italy. Giuseppe Costa was one of his best known students.

Also in 1870, he married Agnese Arena. They had five children, including Virginia Talarico, the operatic soprano. Their eldest son, Achille, was a violinist of some note.

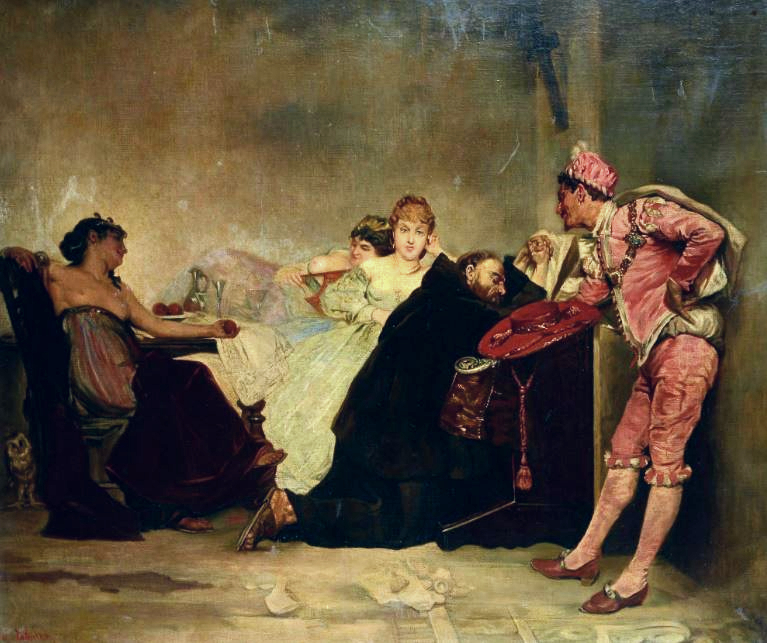
Temptation

He died at his home, aged sixty-five, and was interred at the Cemetery of Poggioreale.

His works may be seen in Rome, at the Galleria Nazionale d'Arte Moderna, in Florence at the Palazzo Pitti, and in Naples at the Museo di San Martino.
