= Francesco Coppola Castaldo =

Italian painter (1847–1916)

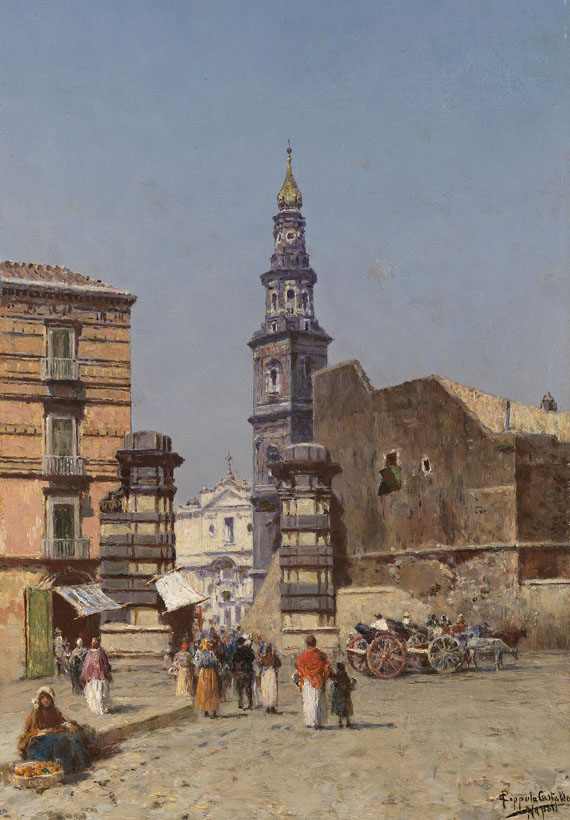
A Scene from Naples

Francesco Coppola Castaldo (11 June 1847, Naples - 17 August 1916, Naples) was an Italian landscape painter.

== Biography ==
He studied at the Accademia di Belle Arti di Napoli, where his primary instructors were Giuseppe Mancinelli and Domenico Morelli. He made his debut in 1863, at the Society for the Promotion of Fine Arts, and would continue to exhibit with them until 1911. His preference for landscapes developed early in his career, and he worked in tempera and gouache as well as oils.

His teaching career began at the Royal Professional School for Women and the Arts. He also served as an Honorary Professor at the Accademia. Naples and the surrounding areas were his favorite subjects, and included seascapes as well as landscapes. He would occasionally create religious scenes; influenced by his continuing friendship with his teacher, Morelli.

In 1870, he joined with Giuseppe Boschetto, Camillo Miola and Giuseppe De Nigris to exhibit at the "German Gallery" on New Bond Street in London. There, he presented two scenes of Naples. Three of his works, A Grove, At the Decline of the Day and On the Shore of the Sea, exhibited at the Society in 1872, 1877 and 1881, were purchased by Vittorio Emanuele II and Umberto I. In addition to his exhibitions there, he also had showings in Genoa, Milan, Turin, Rome and Florence.

According to Angelo De Gubernatis, he also exhibited a seascape at the Paris Salon of 1886, and one of his paintings of Vesuvius was awarded a gold medal there at an unspecified date. This has not been independently confirmed, however.
