= Mazzia =

Mazzia is an Italian surname. Notable people with the surname include:

- Angelo Maria Mazzia (1823–1891), Italian painter
- Bruno Mazzia (born 1941), Italian footballer and manager
- Francesca Mazzia (born 1967), Italian mathematician
- Gonzalo Mazzia (born 1987), Argentine footballer
- Valentino Mazzia (1922–1999), American physician
