= Chi Kang =

Chinese painter and art educator

Chi Kang (Chinese: 季康, 1911–2007), also known by the courtesy name Ningfu and the studio name Fushou Kangning Studio, was a Chinese painter and art educator from Cixi, Zhejiang Province, China, known for his skill in painting figures, beauties, flowers and birds, as well as equestrian art.

== Life ==
Chi Kang was born into a literary family in Cixi in 1911. His wife, Lin Ruo-ji, is the daughter of Taiwanese poet Lin Jing-ren. His father, Ji Yongfang, was an art lover, and his great-grandfather, Ji Boshou, was a painter during the Qing dynasty. His uncle, Ji Shouzheng, was a painter during the early Republic of China era. In 1918, both of his parents died, leaving him and his younger brother, Ji Baofu, as orphans. Chi Kang engaged in meticulous copying of renowned painting manuals held in private collections, such as the Manual of the Mustard Seed Garden, Shizhu Zhai Shuhua Pu (Ten Bamboo Studio Collection of Calligraphy and Painting), and Dianshizhai Shuhuafang (Pointing the Stones to Let the Brush Dance).

His equestrian art was founded on his careful imitations of works by Giuseppe Castiglione (1688–1766), as well as his firsthand observations of horses at the Shanghai racecourse.During his time in Shanghai, he developed close friendships with artists like Pu Ru, Chang Dai-Chien, and Lang Jingshan. Their bond was exceptionally strong.

In 1937, when the Second Sino-Japanese War broke out, Chi Kang traveled through mainland China and Southwest China, experiencing life in Guangzhou, Liuzhou, Guizhou, and Kunming. After the war ended in 1945, he returned to Shanghai.

In 1947, Chi Kang visited Taiwan, and ultimately settled there. He was introduced by his friend to the Shilin Horticultural Farm, where he resided for a time and started painting the variety of orchid from the Farm, that would become a significant subject of his artwork. During his time in Taiwan, he served as a professor of the Fine Arts Department at the Taiwan Academy of Chinese Culture (now the Chinese Culture University), a member of the Fine Arts Education Committee of the Ministry of Education of the Republic of China, and the president of the Taiwan Chinese Painting Association.

In 1957, Chi Kang and his wife, along with Gao Yihong, Gong Shujin, Tao Shoubó, Qiang Shuping, Chen Junfu, Wu Yongchun, Fu Juanfu, Xi Defang, Lin Zhongxing, Shao Youxuan, and six other couples of ink wash painters, founded the "Six Couples Painting Society."

In 1960, Chi Kang, along with Lin Yushan, Fu Juanfu, Chen Dancheng, Ma Shaowen, Wang Zhanru, Zheng Yuebo, and Hu Kemin, formed the "Eight Friends Art Association ."

In 1982, Chi Kang and his wife moved to San Diego, California, in the United States. He died there on April 16, 2007, at the age of 96.

== Art ==
Chi Kang was skilled in meticulous painting, especially portraits of maidens. His works often depicted horses, women, and flowers and birds. These themes became known as the "three masterpieces of Chi Kang." Chang Dai-chien once inscribed a praise on a maiden painting created by Chi Kang in 1977, expressing that, in his extensive survey of hundreds of years' worth of fan paintings featuring maidens, none could compare to Chi Kang's skill. The architect of the Grand Hotel in Taipei, Yang Cho-Cheng, once invited Ji Kang to assist in designing the hotel's carved beams and painted ceilings.。

His paintings have been collected by major museums, including the National Palace Museum and National Museum of History in Taipei, as well as National Taiwan Museum of Fine Arts in Taichung. The Zhongshan Building in Yangmingshan also houses his giant three-panel, eight-fan screen painting of maidens. In addition, his works have appeared in many auctions. In 2010, a memorial exhibition entitled "Elegance and Grace: Chi Kang Memorial Exhibition" was held in National Museum of History in Taipei.
