= Vincenzo Montefusco (painter) =

Italian painter

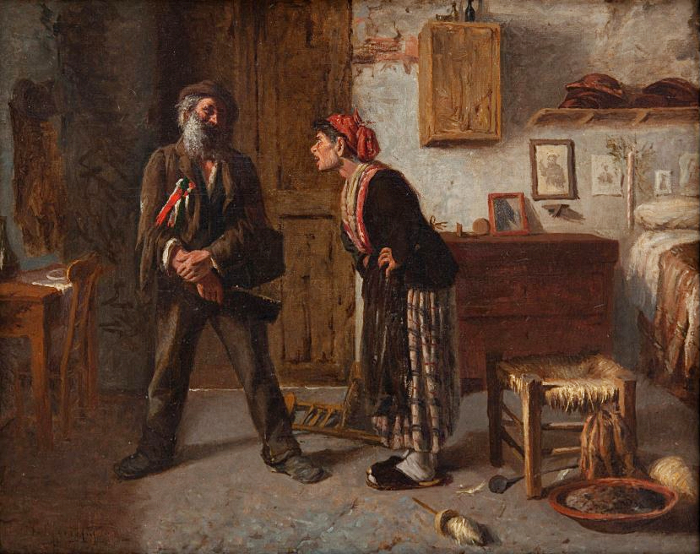
The Reproach

Vincenzo Montefusco (1852 – 1912) was an Italian painter.

== Life and work ==
He was born in Cava dei Tirreni in Campania, Kingdom of the Two Sicilies, and attended the Academy of Fine Arts in Naples. He began his studies with Gabriele Smargiassi and Giuseppe Mancinelli; completing them with Domenico Morelli.

In 1869, he made his debut at the "Society for the Promotion of the Fine Arts" with several landscapes; his initial specialty. By 1873, he had started to favor genre scenes. Most of them depict sentimental themes from everyday life, but some are of a patriotic nature; notably Settembrini in the Prison of Santo Stefano.

Many of his paintings were sold to French collectors, by the Goupil Gallery. His other works include The Public Scribe; On Vesuvius; Borgo Santa Lucia; The Fishmonger; A Toast!; The Boyfriends; and The Pumpkin Seller, He painted in both oils and watercolors, three of which he displayed at the Milan National Exhibition of 1881.

He died in Rome. Many of his works may be seen at the Museo di Capodimonte and the Museum of San Martino in Naples.
