= Ice Rink Piné =

Italian sport's stadium

- Ghiaccio dei Campioni (Ice of Champions)
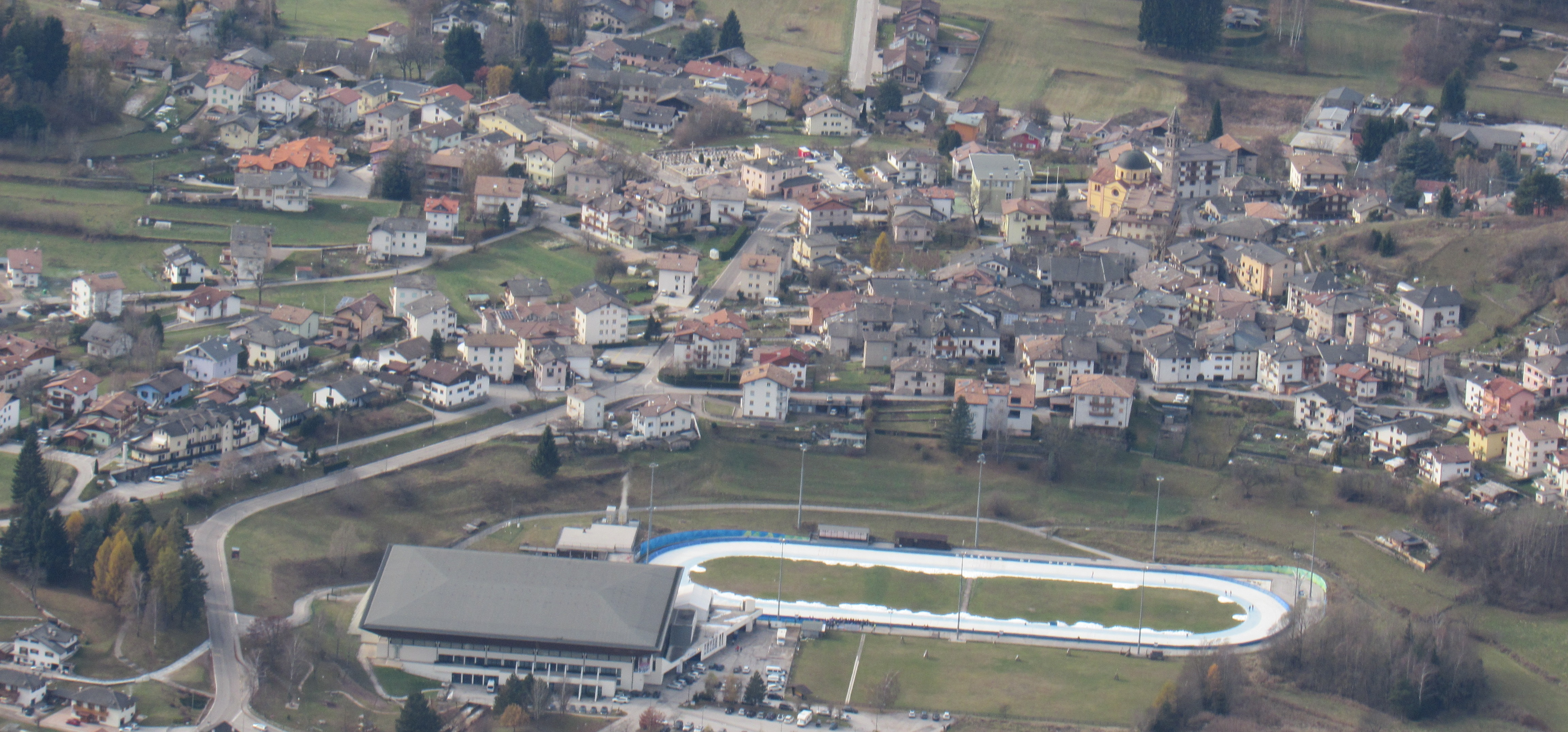
- Interactive map of Ice Rink Piné
- Location: Miola, Baselga di Piné, Italy
- Coordinates: 46°7′36.92″N 11°15′4.76″E
- Owner: City of Baselga di Piné

Ice Rink Piné (Italian: Stadio del ghiaccio di Piné) is a speed skating oval and training facility located in Miola, Baselga di Piné, Italy.

The facility hosts the Italian national speed skating team.

== History ==
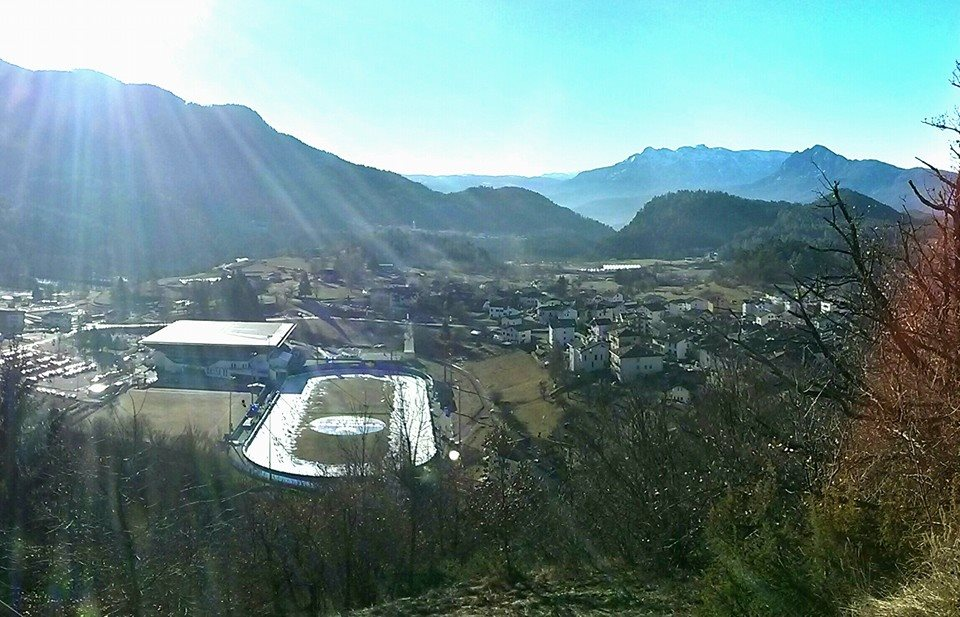
Ice Rink Piné

The construction of the ice rink began in 1984 and was completed the following year. The official opening took place in January 1986 during an international ice speed skating competition.

The Piné ice rink hosted the speed skating and curling competitions of the XXVI Winter Universiade of Trentino 2013 and the Junior Speed Skating World Championships in February 2019.

Among the local skaters who grew up on the Piné oval are Roberto Sighel (first Italian winner of a world title) and Matteo Anesi (gold medal in team pursuit at the 2006 Winter Olympics in Turin).

The facility was slated to host the 2026 Winter Olympics. As originally planned, the oval would be subject to a radical redevelopment that would have led to the construction of a total coverage of the oval, with capacity to accommodate up to 5,000 spectators (3,000 people on the permanent stands and 2,000 people in temporary seating). However, in 2023 after cost overruns, the International Olympic Committee and Organizing Committee decided to move the events to Fiera Milano in Rho.

== Characteristics ==
The facility has an ice speed skating rink, known as Miola di Piné Oval, made of concrete with artificial refrigeration system (which can therefore be used both in winter and in summer with roller skates), consisting of two 113.58 metre long straight lines, connected by two 180° curves, and a total linear length of 400 metres. The width of the track is 12 metres.

Next to the oval, a sports hall has been built which houses a 60 x 30 metre ice rink, used for winter sports such as ice skating, ice hockey, broomball and curling.

== Main events hosted ==
- World Allround Speed Skating Championships for Men: 1995
- World Junior Speed Skating Championships: 1993, 2019
- European Speed Skating Championships: 2001
- Winter Universiade: 2013 (speed skating and curling)
- Italian National Speed Skating Championships: 1996, 1998, 2000, 2002, 2004, 2005 (sprint only), 2006, 2007, 2008, 2009, 2010, 2011, 2012, 2013, 2014, 2015, 2016, 2017
