= Tofano =

Tofano is an Italian surname. Notable people with the surname include:

- Edoardo Tofano (1838–1920), Italian painter
- Rosetta Tofano (1902–1960), Italian costume designer and film star
- Sergio Tòfano (1886–1973), Italian actor, director, playwright, scene designer and illustrator
- Tecla Tofano (1927–1995), Venezuelan artist, ceramicist, and writer
