= Nigro =

Nigro is a surname of Italian origin, meaning black. Notable people with the surname include:

- Carmine Nigro (1910–2001), American chess master and instructor; first coach of Bobby Fischer
- Dan Nigro (born 1982), American songwriter and producer
- Daniel A. Nigro (born 1948), 33rd New York City Fire Commissioner
- Don Nigro (born 1949), American playwright
- Fabio Nigro (born 1965), Argentine association football player
- Filippo Nigro (born 1970), Italian actor
- Frank Nigro (born 1960), Canadian-Italian ice hockey player
- Jan Nigro (1920–2012), New Zealand artist
- Laura Nyro (1947–1997), American singer/songwriter
- Louis J. Nigro Jr. (1947–2013), American diplomat and ambassador
- Pierre Nigro (born 1955), Italian singer better known as Michael Fortunati
- Russell M. Nigro (born 1946), American politician from Pennsylvania; former justice of the Supreme Court of Pennsylvania
- Stefan Nigro (born 1996), Australian footballer

== See also ==
- Negro
- Nigris
