= Francesco Coppola =

Francesco Coppola may refer to:

- Francesco Coppola Castaldo (1847–1916), Italian painter
- Francesco Coppola (journalist) (1878–1957), Italian journalist and politician
- Frank Coppola (mobster) (1899–1982), Italian-American mobster
- Francesco Coppola (footballer) (born 2005), Italian footballer
