= Anselmo Gianfanti =

Italian painter

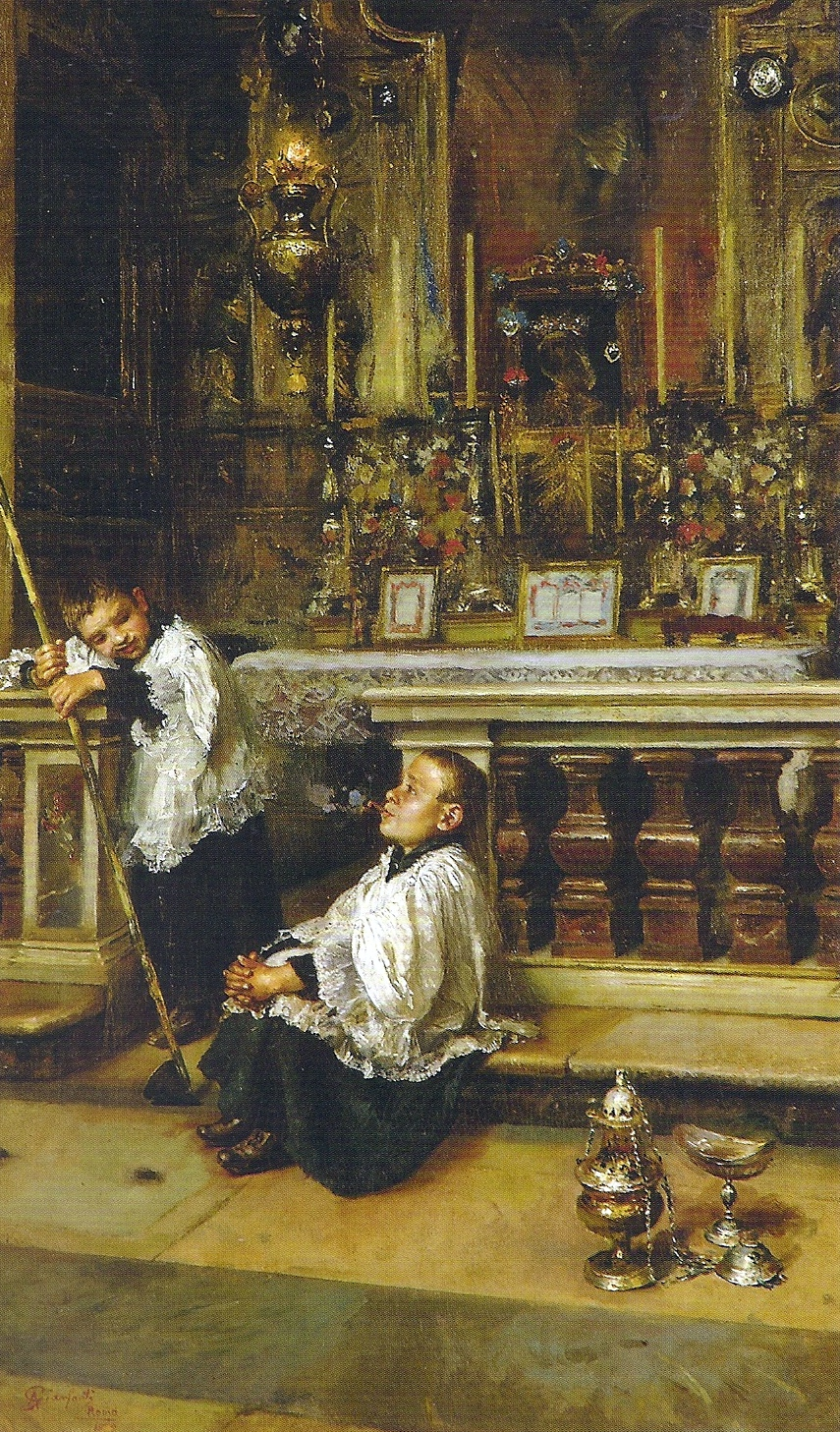
Interior of Church (1889)

Anselmo Gianfanti (28 September 1857–11 January 1907) was an Italian painter known for depiction of genre subjects and portraits. He was born in Montiano, a comune near the city of Cesena. He was a pupil of Domenico Morelli. He painted the Benedicamus Domini in the National Gallery of Modern Art in Rome. He also painted a Frati miniatore and various portraits.

He initially had gained a stipend to study at the Accademia di Belle Arti di Firenze, but by 1880 was in Naples with Morelli. He befriended the painters of Cesena, Paolo Grilli and Tullio Golfarelli. In Cesena, he also met Giosuè Carducci and Nazzareno Trovanelli. He died in Cesena of tuberculosis.
