= Giuseppe Castiglione =

Giuseppe Castiglione may refer to:

- Giuseppe Castiglione (Jesuit painter) (1688–1766), Italian Jesuit Brother, missionary and court painter in China
- Giuseppe Castiglione (1829–1908), Italian painter
- Giuseppe Castiglione (politician) (born 1963), Italian politician
