= Giuseppe Costa =

Italian painter

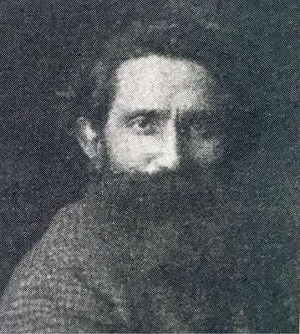
Giuseppe Costa (date unknown)

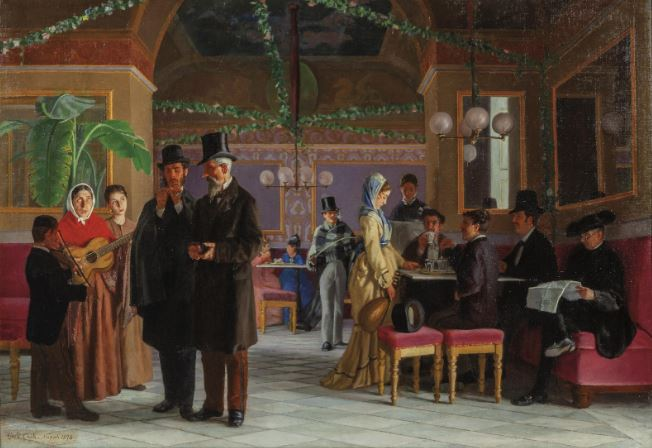
Necessity and Modesty

Giuseppe Costa (6 April 1852, Naples, Kingdom of the Two Sicilies – 9 February 1912, Naples) was an Italian painter; primarily of portraits and genre scenes.

== Life and work ==
When he was still young, his family moved to Chieti, where he took some private painting lessons. Later, he returned to Naples and enrolled at the Accademia di Belle Arti, where his primary instructor was Domenico Morelli. He also studied portrait painting with Achille Talarico.

Beginning in 1875, he held numerous showings at the "Società Promotrice di Belle Arti". He would continue to exhibit there until 1885. He was also a participant in the National Expositions of Milan (1880) and Naples (1906). His final showing was in 1911. Some of his works were purchased by Kings Umberto I and Victor Emmanuel III.

He is largely remembered for his genre scenes, including The Userer and His Victims, Two Orphan Girls, Distraction, After Work, Innocuous Love and Necessity and Modesty. Many of his works are preserved at the Galleria dell'Accademia.
