= San Pietro, Rogliano =

Church in the province of Cosenza, Italy

Coordinates: 39°10′36.09″N 16°19′11.18″E

San Pietro is the duomo or main church of the town of Rogliano, Province of Calabria, Italy.

== Description ==
The church was built in baroque style. The portal in tufo stone dates to 1717, and the interior stucco dates from the 18th century. Inside a gilded chapel is the icon of the Immaculate Conception, which represents the patron of the city. The church has frescoes by the 19th century painter Enrico Salfi.
