= Nigris =

Nigris is a surname of Italian origin, meaning black. Notable people with the surname include:

- Aldo de Nigris (born 1983), Mexican footballer
- Alfonso de Nigris (born 1976), known professionally as Poncho de Nigris, is a Mexican television host
- Antonio de Nigris (1978–2009), Mexican footballer
- Giuseppe De Nigris (1832–1903), Italian painter
- Julie Le Brun (née Julie Nigris; 1780–1819), daughter of Élisabeth Vigée Le Brun, and was the model of many of her paintings
- Leone Giovanni Battista Nigris (1884–1964), Italian prelate of the Catholic Church who worked in Albania, archbishop
