= Ulisse Caputo =

Italian painter

Ulisse Caputo (1872–1948) was a Neapolitan painter who resided in Paris.

He was born in Salerno. He studied under Domenico Morelli and was a collaborator of Gaetano Esposito. Caputo first exhibited in the 1900 Venice Biennale. He painted genre subjects, often finely dressed and in intimate familial situations. He also painted East Asian subjects.

Caputo was known for his paintings of landscapes and views of the Amalfi Coast, painted with calm tones and realism. He exhibited his works in many galleries and museums in Italy and abroad. In 1900, he participated in the Universal Exhibition in Paris. Caputo also painted portraits and still lifes. He lived in Salerno and spent time on the Amalfi Coast. Caputo died in Salerno in 1948.

Caputo's works are preserved in many public and private collections and have been sold at auction. In 2019, a view of the Amalfi Coast was sold at auction for 50,000 euros.
