= Roggiano Gravina =

- Comune
- Comune di Roggiano Gravina
- Location within Italy Location within Calabria
- Coordinates: 39°37′N 16°9′E
- Country: Italy
- Region: Calabria
- Province: Cosenza (CS)

Area
  - Total: 44 km^{2} (17 sq mi)
- Elevation: 260 m (850 ft)

Population (2018-01-01)
  - Total: 7,205
  - Density: 160/km^{2} (420/sq mi)
- Time zone: UTC+1 (CET)
  - Summer (DST): UTC+2 (CEST)
- Website: Official website

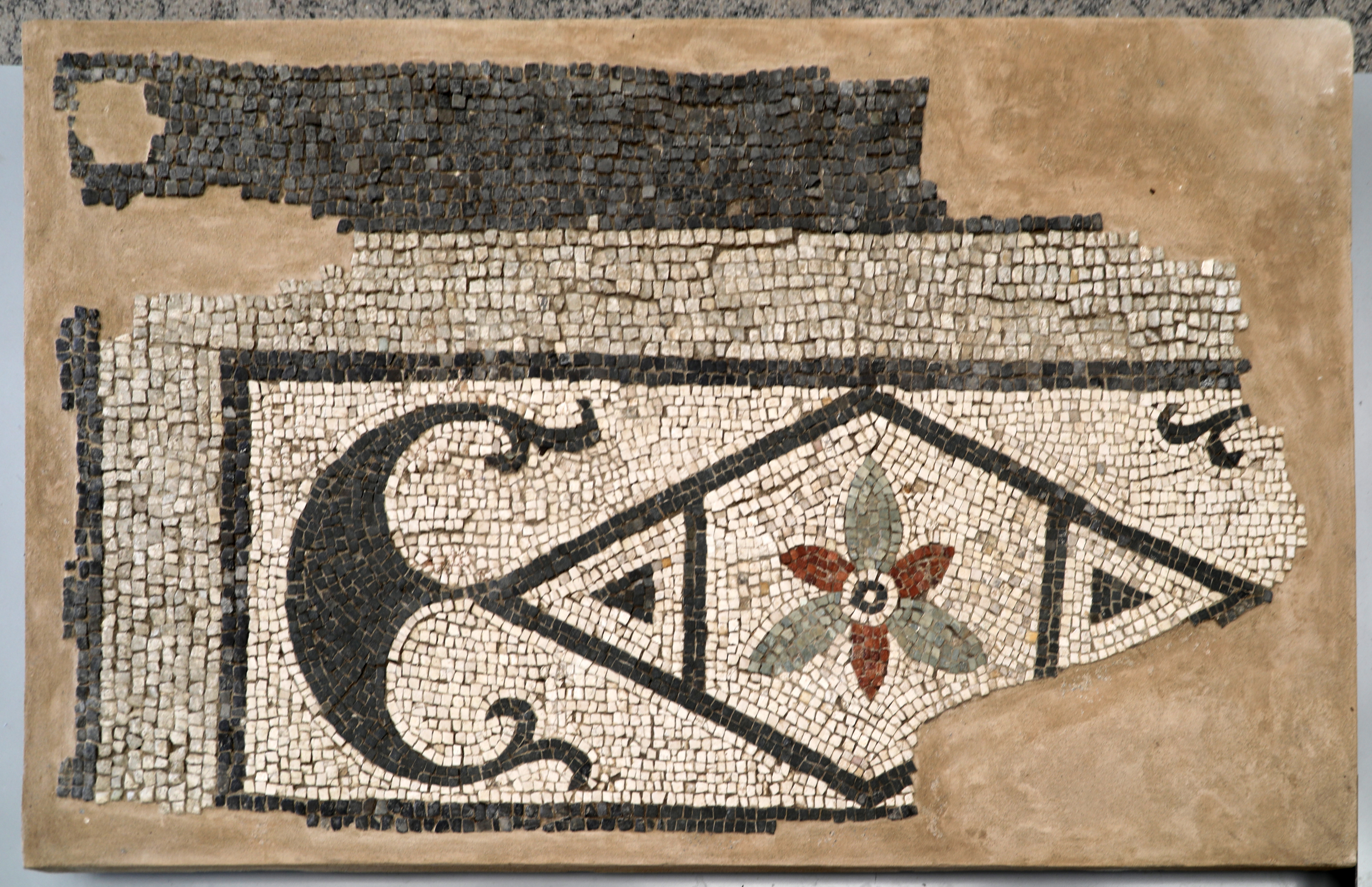
Mosaic, 90-110 AD, from the Villa Larderia (Museum of Sybaris)

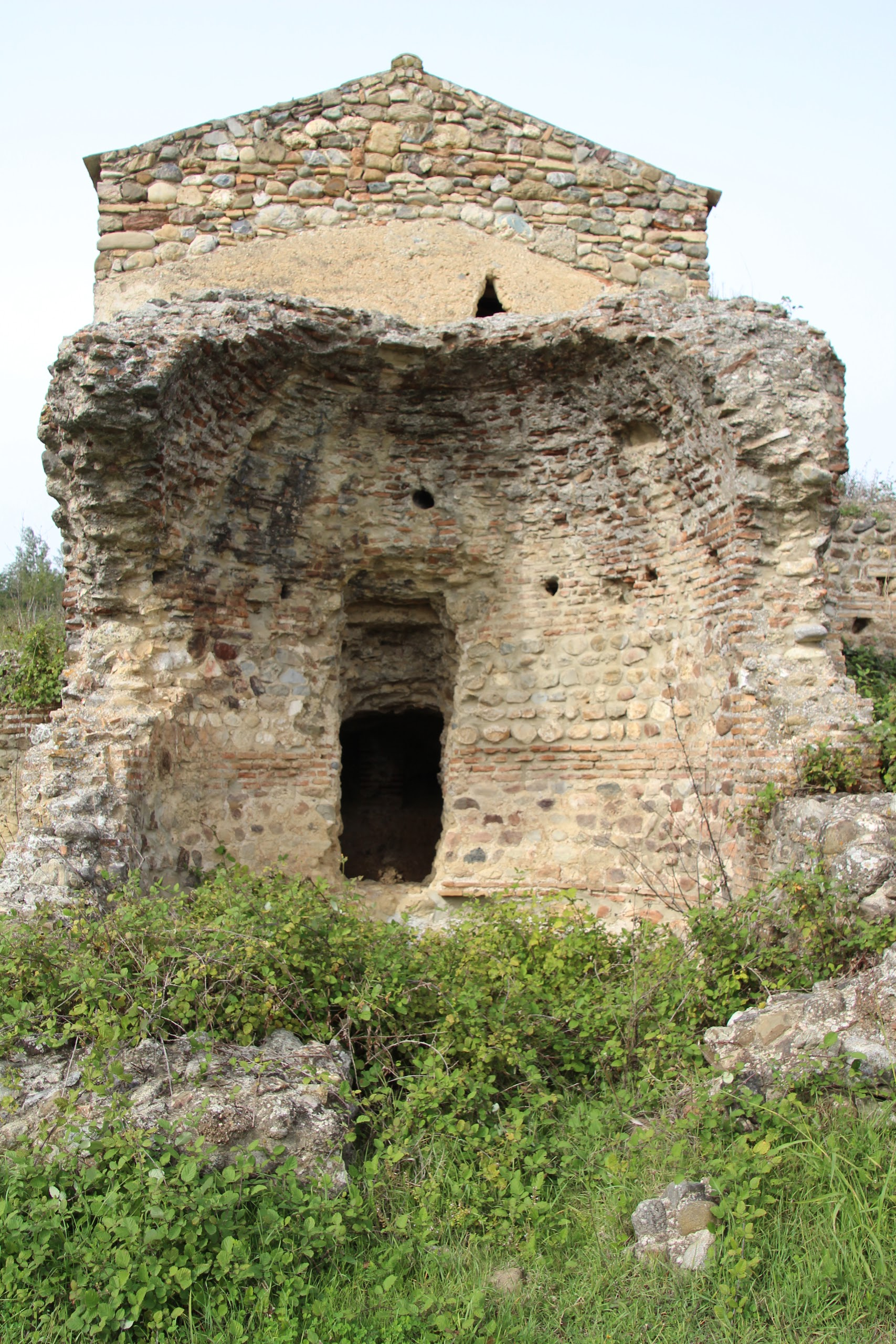
Baths, Roman villa Larderia

Roggiano Gravina is a town and comune in the province of Cosenza in the Calabria region of southern Italy.

The Roman villa of Larderia is one of the most important extra-urban residential complexes in Roman Calabria, both in terms of layout and mosaics floors. The site dates from the end of the 3rd century BC until the early Middle Ages. The villa is built on two terraces: the eastern sector, a group of three rooms and the western sector with a large nymphaeum with a semicircular exedra in front of a cross-shaped room. The residential part to the east overlooked a large courtyard probably with a portico. To the west were large baths with a series of rooms with a hypocaust and geometric mosaic floors from the 2nd century AD.

Giovanni Vincenzo Gravina (1664–1718), an Italian man of letters and jurist was born at Roggiano Gravina. Angelo Maria Mazzia (1823–1891), an Italian painter was also born there.
