= Angelo Maria Mazzia =

Italian painter (1823–1891)

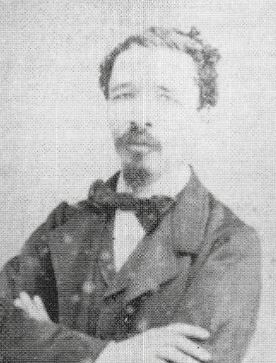
Angelo Maria Mazzia (date unknown)

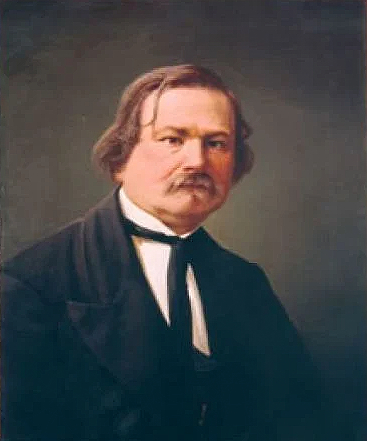
Portrait of Errico Petrella

Angelo Maria Mazzia (7 October 1825 in Roggiano Gravina, Province of Cosenza – 2 January 1890 in Naples) was an Italian painter. His father, Francesco Mazzia, was also a painter.

== Biography ==
He was initially given a standard classical education in Letters at the local Seminary of San Marco, but when he was awarded a scholarship by the province he moved to Naples, to study veterinary medicine. Once there, he began taking private lessons in design from professor Giuseppe Cammarano. This led to another scholarship to study painting at the Royal Academy of Fine Arts. His instructors there were Giuseppe Mancinelli, Costanzo Angelini and Camillo Guerra. In 1860, he became an instructor of the Institute of Fine Arts, where he wrote a text on geometric design. In 1872, he won a position as Professor of Design at the school in Portici.

His works included various portraits of notable people from Calabria. His painting St Sebastian after his Martyrdom was exhibited in 1859 and awarded a gold medal. Also worth mentioning are The Assumption with a Choir of Angels; Saint Cristina (Royal Palace of Caserta); The Virgin of the Catacombs (Museo di Capodimonte); Pope Clement VII and Emperor Charles V (1864); Dante in the Bedlam of the Hypocrites (1866); and Dante in the Light, Rome in Darkness (1872), which was exhibited at the Brera Academy . The following year, it was shown at the World's Fair in Vienna.

He was awarded the Knight's Cross of the Order of the Crown of Italy, and was honorary President of the Society of Mechanical Operators in Portici. His portrait of Errico Petrella is in the picture gallery of the Music Conservatories of Naples. Enrico Salfi was one of his pupils.

The Municipality of Roggiano Gravina has dedicated a street to him.
