= Camillo Miola =

Italian painter

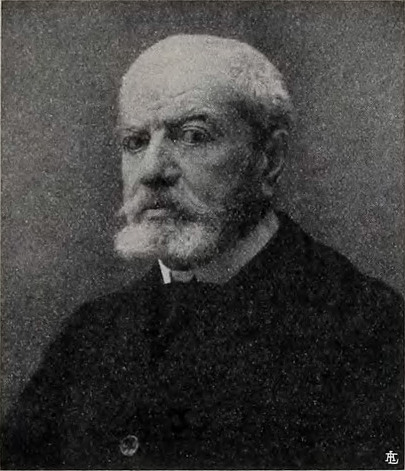
- Born: 14 September 1840; Naples
- Died: 4 May 1919 (aged 78); Naples
- Alma mater: Accademia di Belle Arti di Napoli
- Occupation: Painter

Camillo Miola (14 September 1840 – 4 May 1919), also known as Biacca, was an Italian painter of historical scenes and portraits. He often portrayed Neo-Pompeian and Orientalist subjects.

== Biography ==
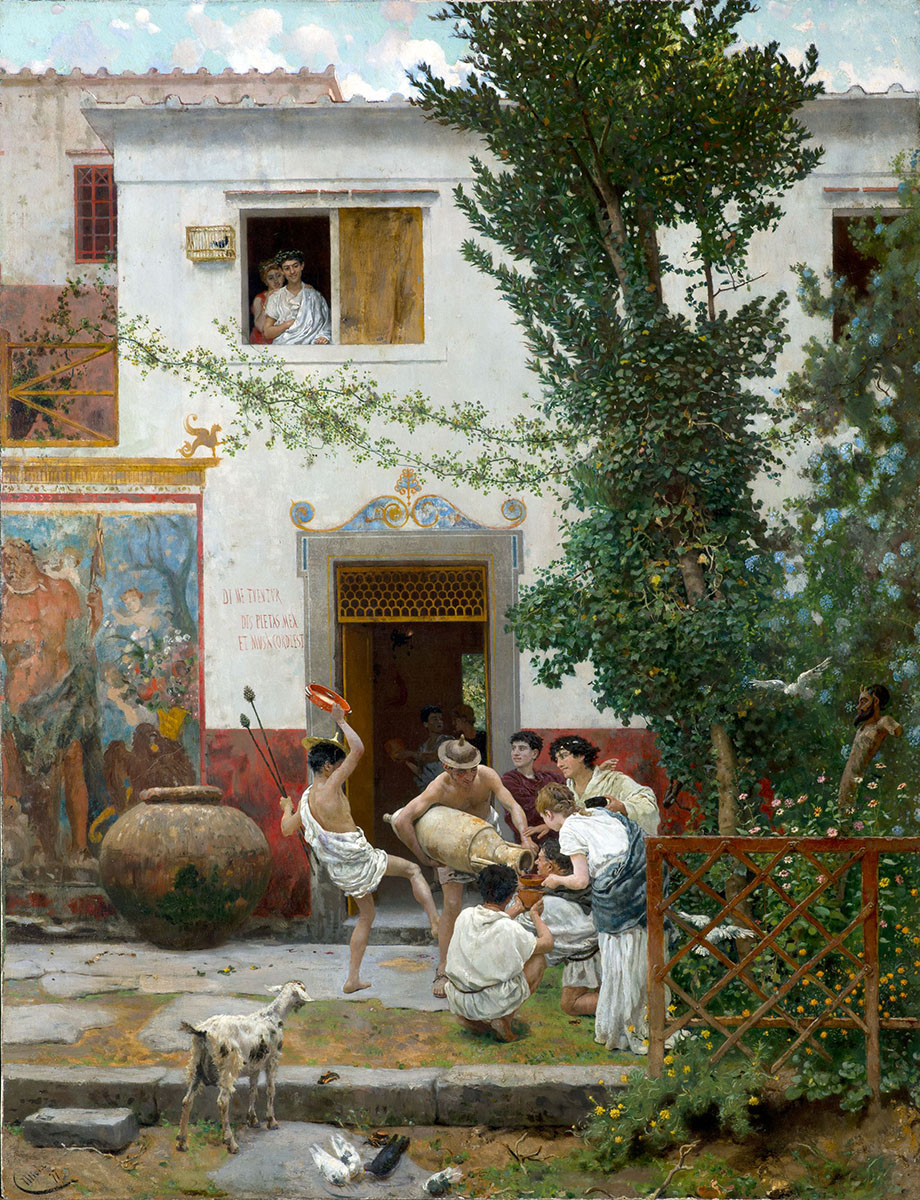
Horace in the Villa

Miola was born in Naples. He received a Jesuit education and briefly worked for the government, while pursuing his interest in art. At the age of 21 became a pupil of the Royal Institute of Fine Arts in Naples, where his primary instructor was Domenico Morelli. He was a contemporary of another Morelli pupil, Giuseppe Boschetto, who also painted Ancient Roman topics.

His first painting exhibited in Naples was Francesco Pusterla and the Astrologer Tommaso Pizzano (a scene from the novel Margherita Pusterla by Cesare Cantù). He traveled to Paris in 1867 to work in the studio of the Neoclassic sculptor Jean-Louis Ernest Meissonier and met Gérôme. He returned to Naples by 1868.

He participated in competitions in Naples, Dublin and Paris, entering the work Plautus the Miller, now found in Naples. He exhibited Erinna of Lesbos at Naples and, at Paris, in the Exposition Universelle of 1867, the Bust of Cicero. Other major works are Tarquin and the Sibyl, The Daneids, The Oracle of Delphi (exhibited at Turin in 1880), The Bow Sentry, (exhibited in Milan in 1881), Death of Verginia (exhibited at the newly opened Palazzo delle Esposizioni in Rome in 1883), Horace in the villa (exhibited in 1877 at Naples), and A Roman and a Barbarian (exhibited at the Exposition Universelle of 1878 in Paris).

The Princess of Bauffremont commissioned a Portrait of the Abbott Vito Fornari. In 1876 he painted the Prophet Elias for the Cathedral of Altamura. He was President of the Artistic Congress of Rome in 1883, and served for five years as the Secretary of the Società Promotrice delle Belle Arti. He was also Director for Costumes for the theatrical presentations of Plautus' comedies at the University of Naples.

In 1883, he traveled to Egypt, and the next year, he was invited by the Prince of Sirignano, to travel on his yacht along with the painters Francesco Netti and Eduardo Dalbono, as the Prince visited the east Mediterranean coasts. This led Miola to paint some orientalist canvases.

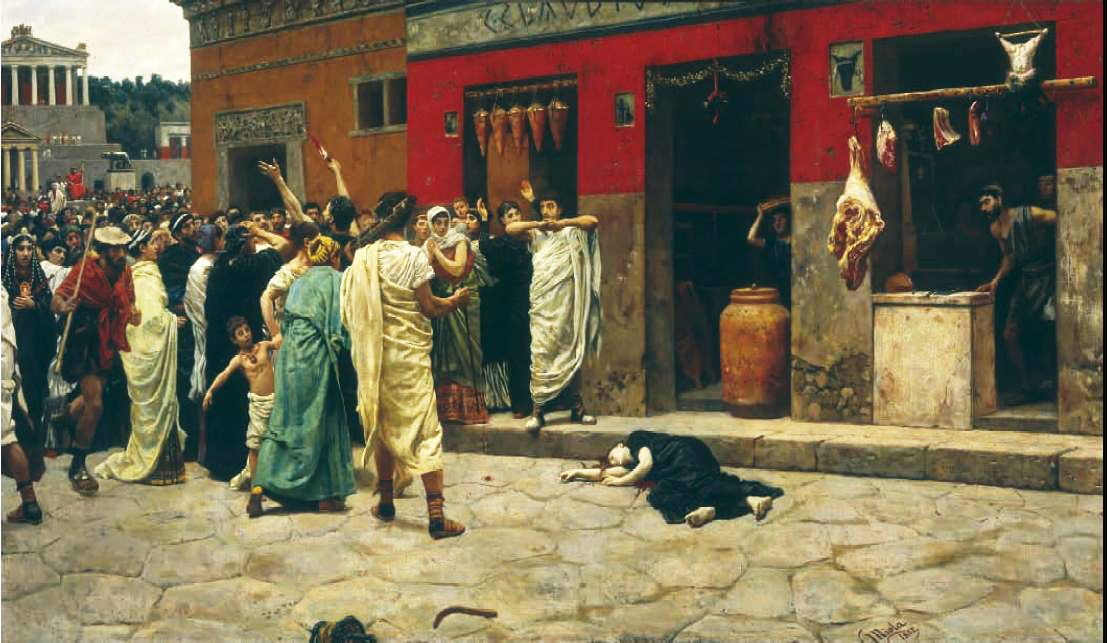
Death of Verginia (1882). Naples, Museo di Capodimonte.

He was made an honorary Professor of the Royal Institute. In addition to painting, he was known for his art criticism, and wrote under the pseudonym of "Biacca". In the 1890s, he taught drawing in a girls' school and gave lessons in the history of art at the Naples academy. He died in Naples, aged 78.

The Oracle

Camillo Miola (Biacca) - The Oracle The Pythia, a virgin from the local village selected in ceremonies that established her as Apollo's choice, sits atop the sacred tripod as the Delphic oracle. To the left is the omphalos, the most sacred object at Delphi, regarded as the center of the earth. A plinth on the right bears an inscription describing Apollo's conquest of Delphi with the Cretans, who became his first priests.
