= Paolo Grilli =

Italian painter

Paolo Grilli (3 August 1857 – 16 January 1952) was an Italian sculptor and painter.

== Biography ==
He was born in Cesena. In the early 1880s, he studied in the Academy of Fine Arts in Florence, and later in Rome. He returned to Cesena, where he was active in creating statues, busts and medallions for public and private commissions. He died in Rome.

It is unclear what his relationship was to Paolo Grilli, also from Cesena, who was arrested, along with Paolo Tibaldi from Longo and Giuseppe Bartolotti from Bologna, on June 13, 1857, in Paris for a conspiracy to murder the Emperor Napoleon III of France. This conspiracy appears to have been hatched by or with the help of Giuseppe Mazzini, then in exile in London. This is about a year before the Orsini affair.
