= Enrico Salfi =

Italian painter

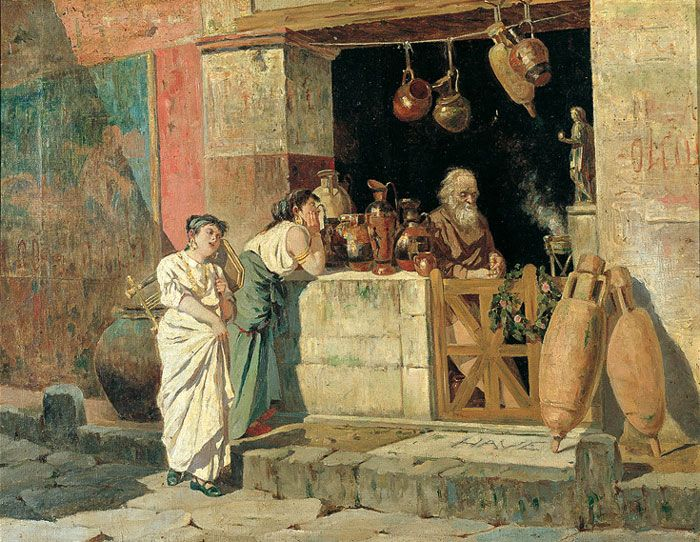
The Amphora Salesman

Enrico Salfi (28 November 1857 – 14 January 1935) was an Italian painter, mainly of biblical or Ancient Roman subjects. He also excelled in oil portraits.

== Biography ==
He was born in Cosenza. In 1876, he began his studies at the Tarantino Lyceum, where he was a pupil of Vincenzo Marinelli, among others. Like Domenico Morelli, Giuseppe Sciuti and Cesare Maccari, he had a predilection for "Pompeiian" or "Neo-Pompeiian" scenes.

He lived in Palermo until the 1918, then moved to Petrosino. In 1883 in Rome, he created two Pompeiian scenes titled The Amphora Salesman and Licet? (Is it Allowed?), the latter of which was acquired by the Provincial Council of Naples. In 1885, he exhibited Golgotha at the Society for the Promotion of the Fine Arts. Once again in Rome, in 1887, he exhibited a Utopia of Lace, a Madonna and a Face of Jesus. In 1898, at the General Exposition in Turin, he exhibited Le Maghe (Sorceresses).

He painted an altarpiece for the Church of Basilicata, depicting Saint Francis of Paola in Ecstasy. At the Exposizione Permanente on the island of Capri, he displayed an Effect of Lights.

In Cosenza, he painted an Allegory of the Arts (1905) on the ceiling of the Teatro Massimo, which was destroyed during a bombardment in World War II. He also painted a large canvas depicting The Sons of Brutus for the City Council of Cosenza. In addition to his art, he published a small volume of poetry, titled Lirica Pompeiana and served in several official positions, including "Inspector of Monuments and Excavations" (1897–1903).

He also painted extensively for churches throughout Calabria, including San Domenico in Cerisano, the parish church of Parenti, the church of San Pietro in Rogliano, and the ceiling of the original church of San Nicola di Bari in Cosenza, which was demolished in 1961. Among other works are Satan Vanquished (exhibited in Genoa, 1904); Judas (at the International Exhibition of Art in Rome, 1911); Waiting for the wife (Biennali d'Arte Calabrese, 1922); and the somewhat hallucinatory Song of Songs (Biennale Reggina, 1926). At the Sixth exhibition of Art and Artistry of Reggio Calabria in 1931, he depicted the anti-semitic image of the legendary Wandering Jew (“L’ebreo errante”).

Salfi died in 1935 in Cosenza.
