= Francesca Mazzia =

Italian applied mathematician

Francesca Mazzia (born 13 March 1967) is an Italian applied mathematician and computer scientist specializing in numerical analysis, including numerical methods for ordinary differential equations. She is a professor of computer science at the University of Bari.

== Education and career ==
Mazzia was born on 13 March 1967 in Taranto, and earned a laurea (the Italian equivalent of a master's degree) in information science in 1989 at the University of Bari, advised by Donato Trigiante.

After continuing to work at the University of Bari as a researcher in the department of mathematics, beginning in 1990, She took a postdoctoral research position in parallel algorithms at the Centre européen de recherche et de formation avancée en calcul scientifique (CERFACS), in Toulouse, France, from 1997 to 1998, with the support of a Marie Curie Research Training Grant.

Returning to Italy, she took an associate professor position in the department of mathematics at the University of Bari in 2000. In 2018, she moved to the department of computer science as a full professor.

== Book ==
Mazzia is a coauthor of the book Solving Differential Equations in R (Springer, 2012), with Dutch ecoscientist Karline Soetaert and British mathematician Jeff R. Cash. The book was listed by the Association for Computing Machinery as one of the best computing books published in 2012.

== Recognition ==
Mazzia is an honorary fellow of the European Society of Computational Methods in Sciences, Engineering and Technology.
