= Edoardo Tofano =

Italian painter (1838–1920)

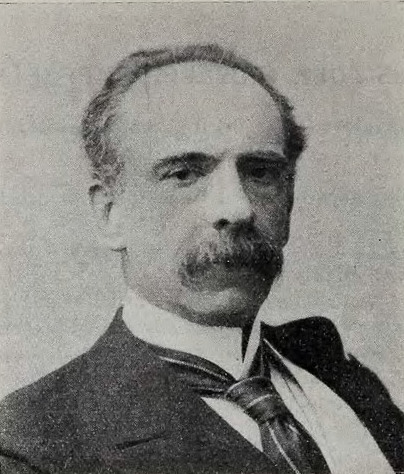
- Born: 31 August 1838; Naples
- Died: 20 December 1920 (aged 82); Rome
- Occupation: Painter

Edoardo Tofano (1838 in Naples – 1920 in Rome) was an Italian painter. He painted historic, genre and Orientalist themes.

== Biography ==
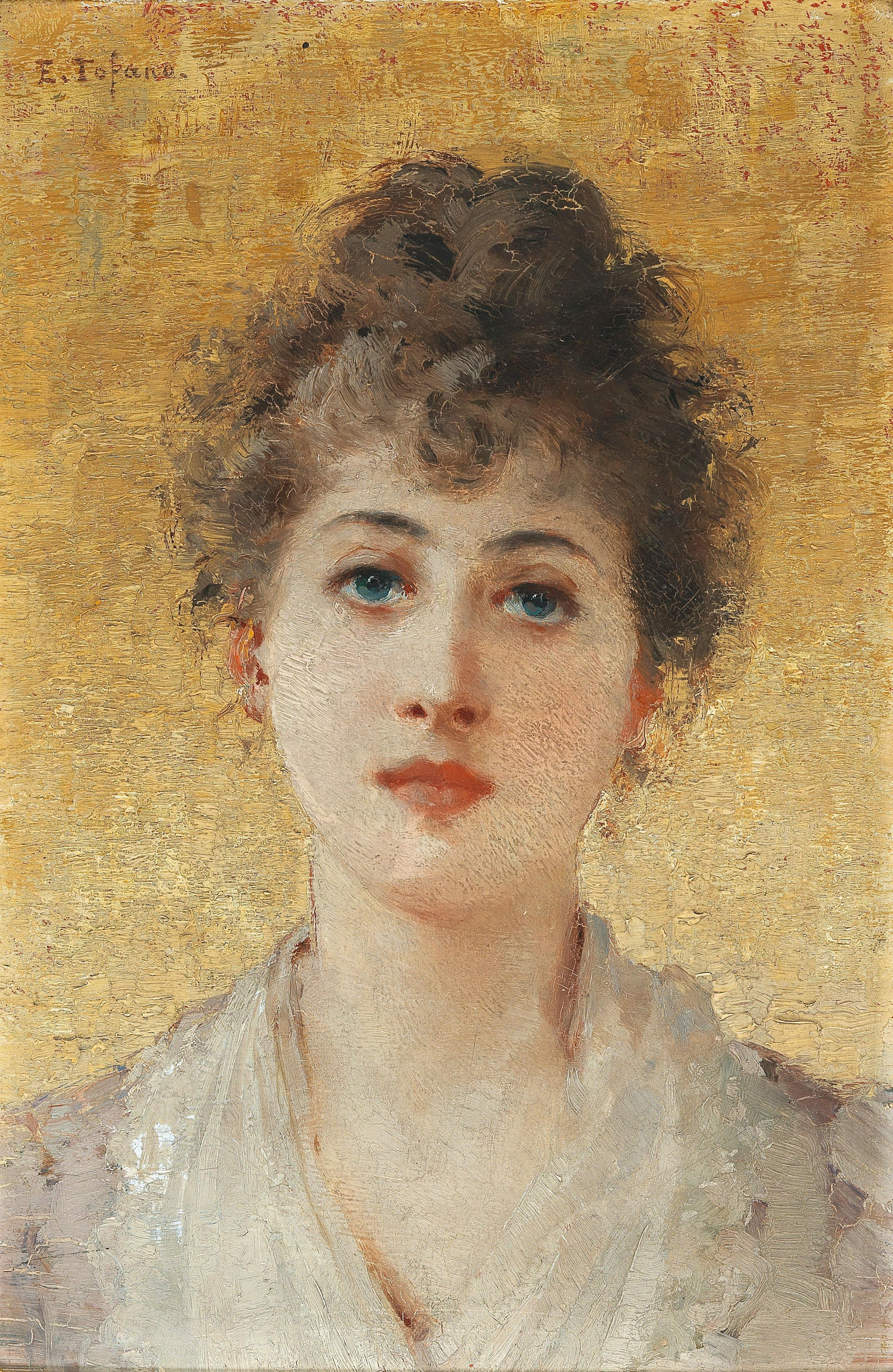
In deep thought, oil on panel

He began his studies at the Albertina Academy of Turin, but completed studies at the Accademia Clementina of Bologna. He then returned to Naples where he became a follower of the Realism of Domenico Morelli. At the age of 23 (1861), he was recruited as an instructor at the Art Institute of Naples, a post he held until 1864. He resigned to create works marketed by the Goupil Gallery in Paris, and was patronized by British collectors.

Among his work are The cabin of Nelson and Donna con Ventaglio (Girl with Fan) He also painted orientalist subjects and portraits, including those exhibited at 1897 at London, Portrait of Lady Hastings Campbell (Flora Mure-Campbell, Marchioness of Hastings?) and in 1906 at Paris (Princess Alexandria of Yugoslavia).

== See also ==
- List of Orientalist artists
- Orientalism
