= Giuseppe De Nigris =

Italian painter (1832–1903)

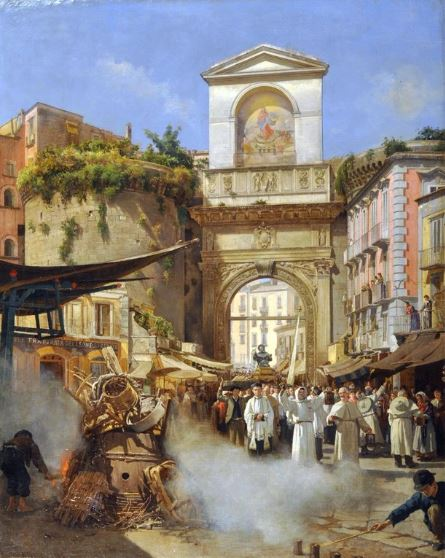
At the Gates of Capua, 1883

Giuseppe De Nigris (7 July 1832 – 2 February 1903) was an Italian painter who depicted genre scenes and still-lifes in a style known as Neo-Pompeian.

== Life and works ==
He was born in Foggia. In 1848, he and a friend left to study in Rome. Due to the ongoing revolution, he was arrested for suspected seditious activity. Repatriated, he moved to Naples, where he had studied at the Academy of Fine Arts under Giuseppe Mancinelli. He was able to return to Rome in 1859, when Domenico Morelli gave him a letter of introduction to work in the studios of Achille Vertunni. A year later he returned to Naples, which was in a state of patriotic ferment from the activities of Garibaldi.

Among his first works exhibited in Naples were Love Song, The Last Mass, The Blind Workers, and Wine and Women. In later Neapolitan exhibitions, he displayed Christ in the Garden (1855) and Ossian and Malvina (1859). After 1860, his subject matter included patriotic and genre themes, in addition to Neo-Pompeian subjects. These works included The Parish Bell, The Thief's Hand, Garibaldi Said: What a Sad Fate it is for Men to Slaughter Each Other (1862), and The Penitence Procession in the Catacombs of Naples (1880).

Outside of Naples, he displayed Small Pompeian Gladiators (1870, Parma), The Last Day of Pompei (1873, Vienna), A Final Mass (1878, Paris), The First Portrait (1887, Venice), Mannequin (1892, Florence), and The Office of the Phrenologist Gall (1894, Rome). He also participated in many exhibits outside of Central Europe, including Melbourne (1880) and London (1888), where he painted two still-life arrangements on a bright background and presented them at the Cheltenham Gallery. His still-lifes were influenced by Gioacchino Toma.

He is, perhaps, best known for his patriotic canvases. In addition to Garibaldi Said..., he created Garibaldi at Caprera, The Death of Mentana, The Impressions of a Painting and The Miracles of Chassepot.

De Nigris died in Naples in 1903.

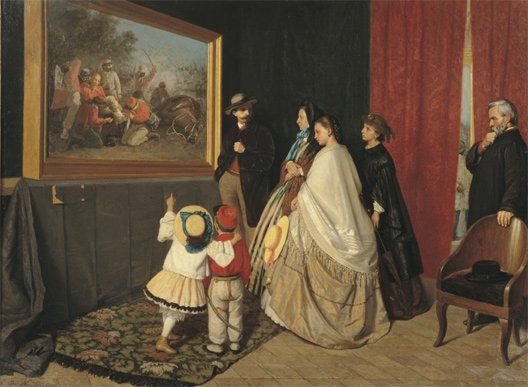
The Impressions of a Painting, 1863
