= Giuseppe Boschetto =

Italian painter (1841–1918)

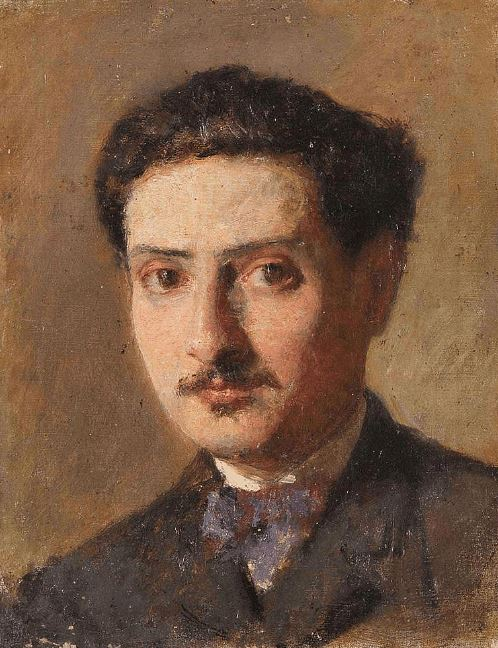
- Born: April 1841; Naples
- Died: 1918 (aged 76–77); Naples

Giuseppe Boschetto (1841–1918) was an Italian painter, specializing in historical scenes. Many were set in ancient Greece or Rome, in a style known as Neo-Pompeian.

== Life and work ==
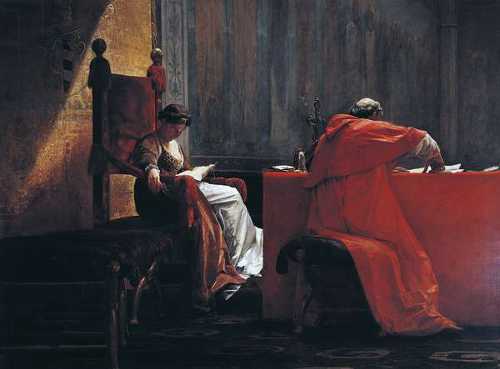
Lucrezia Borgia and Her Father, Pope Alexander VI

He was born to family of successful merchants, who supported his interest in art. His first lessons were in the studios of Giuseppe Mancinelli. Later, he worked with Domenico Morelli, for whom he was a prominent pupil.

His first exhibitions came in the 1860s; notably a depiction of Galileo appearing before the Holy Office, which was shown at the Society for the Promotion of Fine Arts in 1865. His rendering of Eleonora Pimentel Fonseca being led to the gallows was shown at the Royal Palace in 1868. Several more major works were displayed at the Society during the 1870s, including Sortilege (1874) and Maga (Sorceress, 1877). That same year, he exhibited The proscriptions of Sulla and Agrippina spies on the Senate, at the Galleria dell'Accademia.

In the 1880s, he began exhibiting outside of Naples. Notable examples include Santa Lucia in Naples at the Industrial Exhibition in Turin (1880), and The Death of Socrates, at the new Palazzo delle Esposizioni in Rome (1883). Several of his paintings were purchased by Goupil & Cie of Paris.

Upon his older brother's death, he gave up painting to manage the family's business interests. His lack of commercial expertise led to a series of poor investments, leaving him penniless and in debt. He attempted to restart his painting career, but was rebuffed when he applied for a teaching position at the Academy of Fine Arts. Even his application for a part-time night school position was deemed insufficient. For several years, he operated a small workshop that was frequented by young artists, but that was interrupted by World War I. He died indigent and largely forgotten.
