= Giuseppe Mancinelli (painter) =

Italian painter

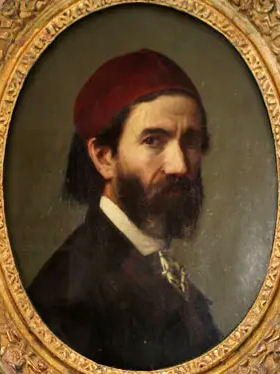
Self-portrait (date unknown)

Giuseppe Mancinelli (17 March 1813 – 25 May 1875) was an Italian painter of religious and historical scenes.

== Biography ==
Mancinelli was born in Naples, Italy. His father, Pietro, was in the service of the noble Ventignano family. With their support, at the age of twelve, he was able to enroll at the Royal Academy of Fine Arts in Naples, where his primary instructor was Costanzo Angelini. At the age of seventeen, he began taking part in the Bourbon Exhibitions; winning a major award in 1835. This enabled him to go to Rome, where he studied with Vincenzo Camuccini. Although he focused on Renaissance art, he also made contact with the practitioners of contemporary styles, including the German immigrant artists of the Nazarene movement and the adherents of Purismo.

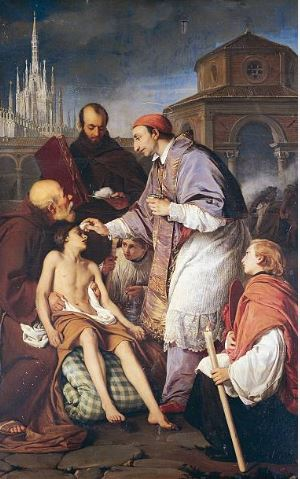
St. Charles Borromeo administering Extreme Unction to a Plague Victim

He married Maddalena Arnoldi in 1840. They had seven children together. Over the next few years, he dedicated a series of drawings to his wife's family and continued to participate in the Bourbon Exhibitions.

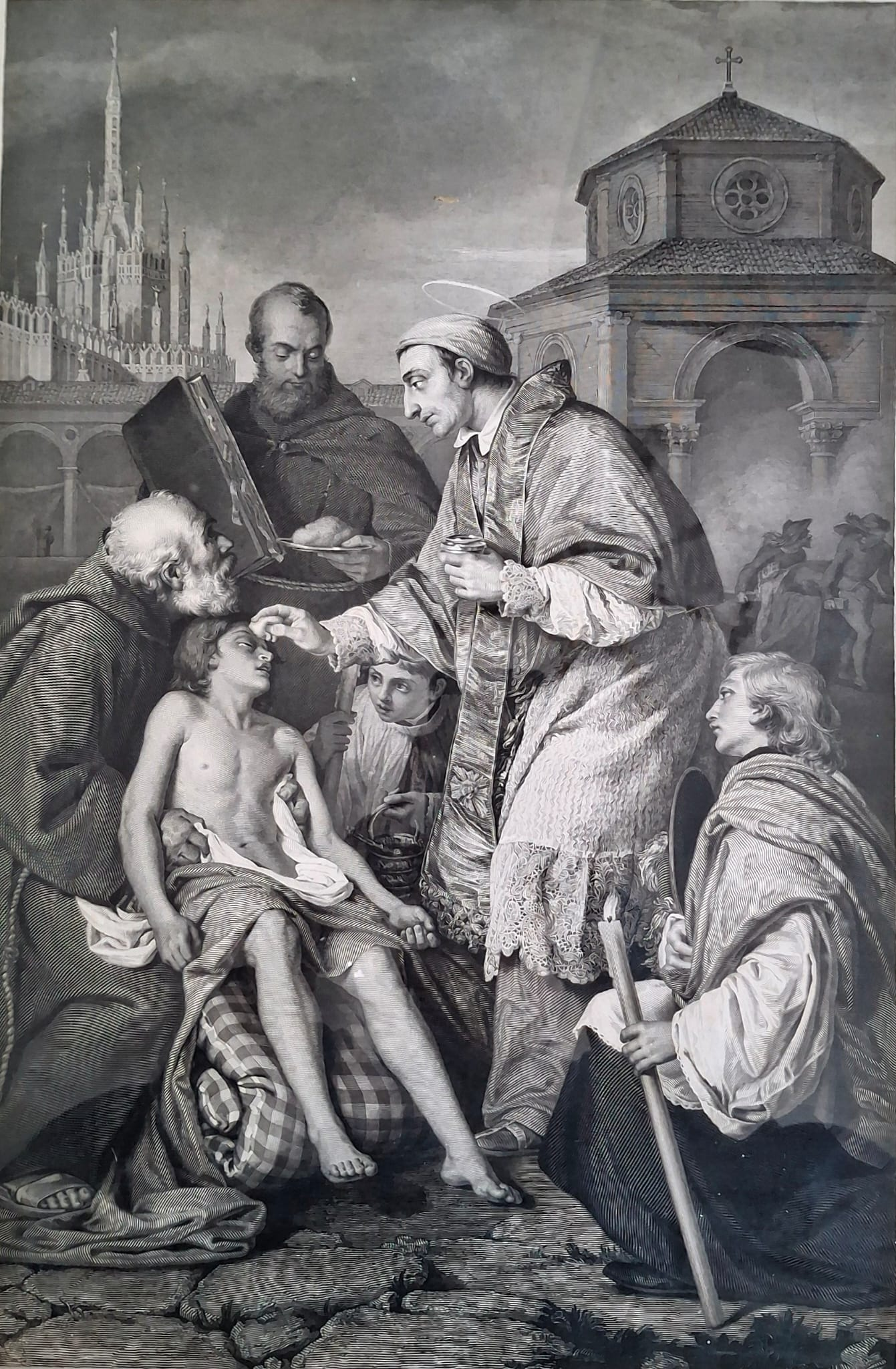
Tommaso Aloysio Juvara and Francesco Di Bartolo after Giuseppe Mancinelli, Saint Charles Borromeo administering Extreme Unction to a Plague Victim, engraving, 1875

After returning to Naples, in 1847 Mancinelli painted the large canvas Saint Charles Borromeo Administering Extreme Unction to a Plague Victim for the church of San Carlo all'Arena in Naples. For this, he was awarded the Royal Order of Francis I. The work was so successful in Naples that the Bourbon government, which had commissioned it from the artist, promoted its reproduction as an engraving for devotional circulation, entrusting the project to the engraver Tommaso Aloysio Juvara.

The engraving had a long and complex history. The preparatory drawing was made by Saro Cucinotta; the plate was begun by Juvara and later completed by his pupil Francesco Di Bartolo, who worked on it for many years. The engraving was published in Rome in 1875 by the Regia Calcografia.

In 1851 Mancinelli won in Naples a competition for the Chair of Painting at the Institute. Two years later, he was named Professor of Design there, replacing his former teacher, Angelini, who had died.

During the decade that he spent teaching, he acted as a mediator between the competing Classical, Romantic and Realistic styles. His well-known students included Francesco Coppola Castaldo, Cesare Uva, Giuseppe De Nigris, Angelo Maria Mazzia and Valerico Laccetti, as well as his own son, Gustavo. He also continued to paint and, in 1854, created theatre curtains for the Teatro di San Carlo, depicting Homer being honored by muses, poets and musicians. This replaced the original curtain by Giuseppe Cammarano that had burned in a fire.

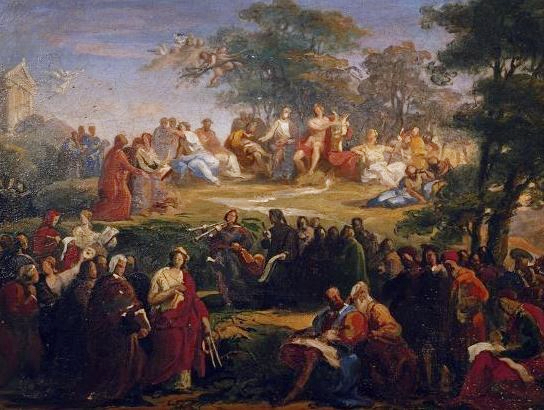
Sketch for the San Carlo theater curtain

After 1860, due to the decrease of interest in historical paintings, he handed over his teaching duties to Domenico Morelli; focusing on religious and devotional subjects. Several of his works were shown in the Vatican Pavilion at the Exposition Universelle (1867). His last work, completed shortly before his death, was a depiction of the Virgin in the Temple, for the Cathedral of Altamura.

== Bibliography ==
- Eleonora Damiani, Giuseppe Mancinelli e le sue opere, Palermo, Alberto Reber, 1906
- Anna Caputi, Raffaello Causa, Raffaele Mormone (Eds.), La Galleria dell'Accademia di Belle Arti in Napoli, Banco di Napoli, 1971
- Di Bartolo, Natalia, Francesco Di Bartolo (1826–1913), engraver and painter: Essays for the Bicentenary. OperaeOpera 2026.
