= Giuseppe Castiglione (1829–1908) =

Italian painter

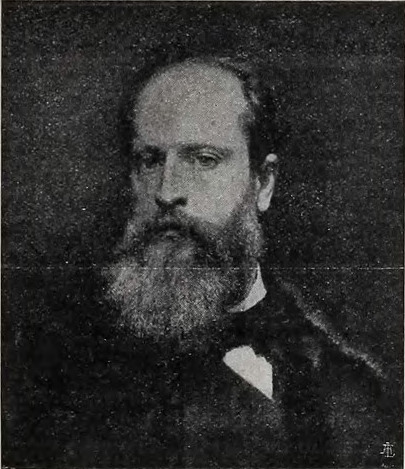
- Born: 5 April 1829
- Occupation: Painter

Signature
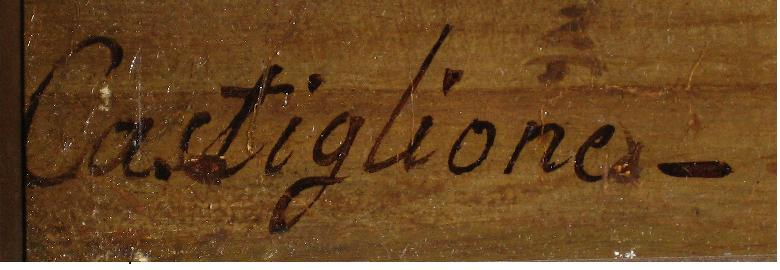

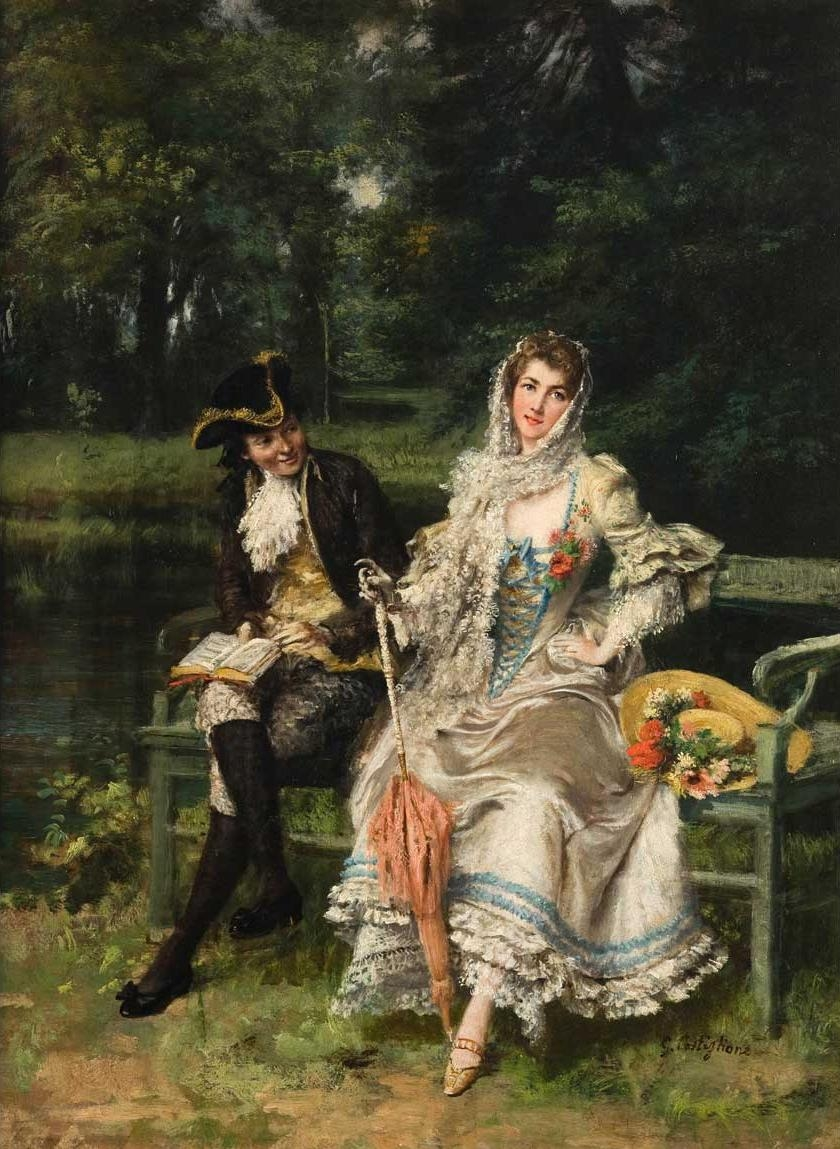
Couple on a Park Bench

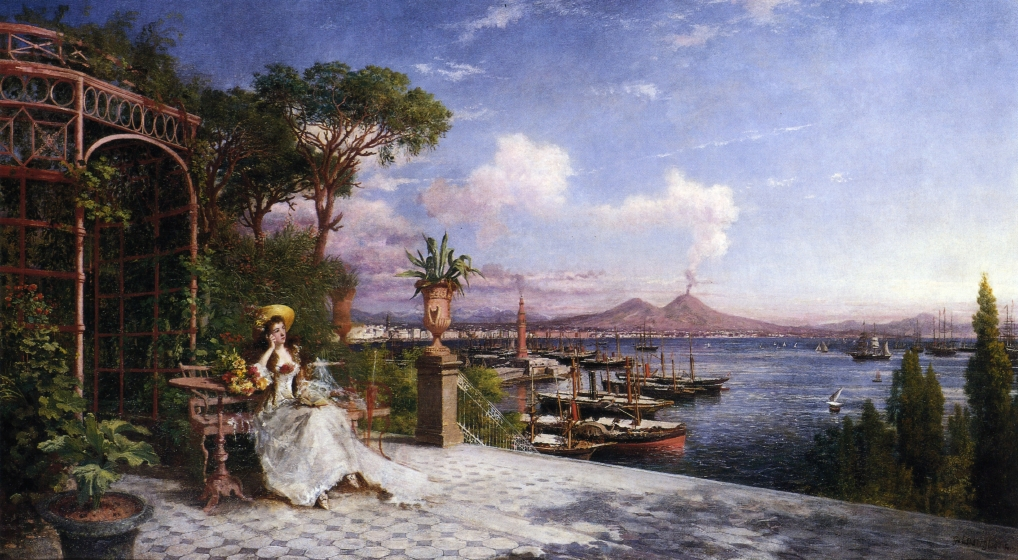
Lost in Reverie by The Bay of Naples.

Giuseppe Castiglione (1829–1908) was an Italian artist known for genre paintings and portraits.

Castiglione was born in Naples, Kingdom of the Two Sicilies. He moved to Paris early in his career and is thought to have studied painting there. He started exhibiting his paintings in Paris and Turin. He was a member of the Société des Artistes Français and was awarded honorable mention at the 1861 Salon exhibition. He was awarded a medal at the Salon exhibition of 1869. At the Exposition Universelle of 1900, Castiglione was awarded a bronze medal. He was decorated with the Légion d’honneur in 1893.

He played chess.

== Works ==
These include:

- Le Salon Carré, 1861, 69 x 103 cm, Louvre museum, Paris
- Visiting the Cardinal Uncle, Philadelphia Exposition, 1876, medal
- The Warrants, 1876
- The Terrace of the Palace Royal at Naples, Paris, 1877
- A Duel Without Witnesses, Paris, 1877
- Portrait of Pandolfini of the Theater des Italians, 1878
- Lesson to the Paroquet, 1878
- A View of Haddon Hall, England, Invaded by Soldiers of Cromwell, Paris Exposition 1878
- The Introduction
- The Three Musketeers, VerzamelaarsVeiling oktober 2017
- On the River at Dusk
