= Domenico Morelli =

Italian painter (1823–1901)

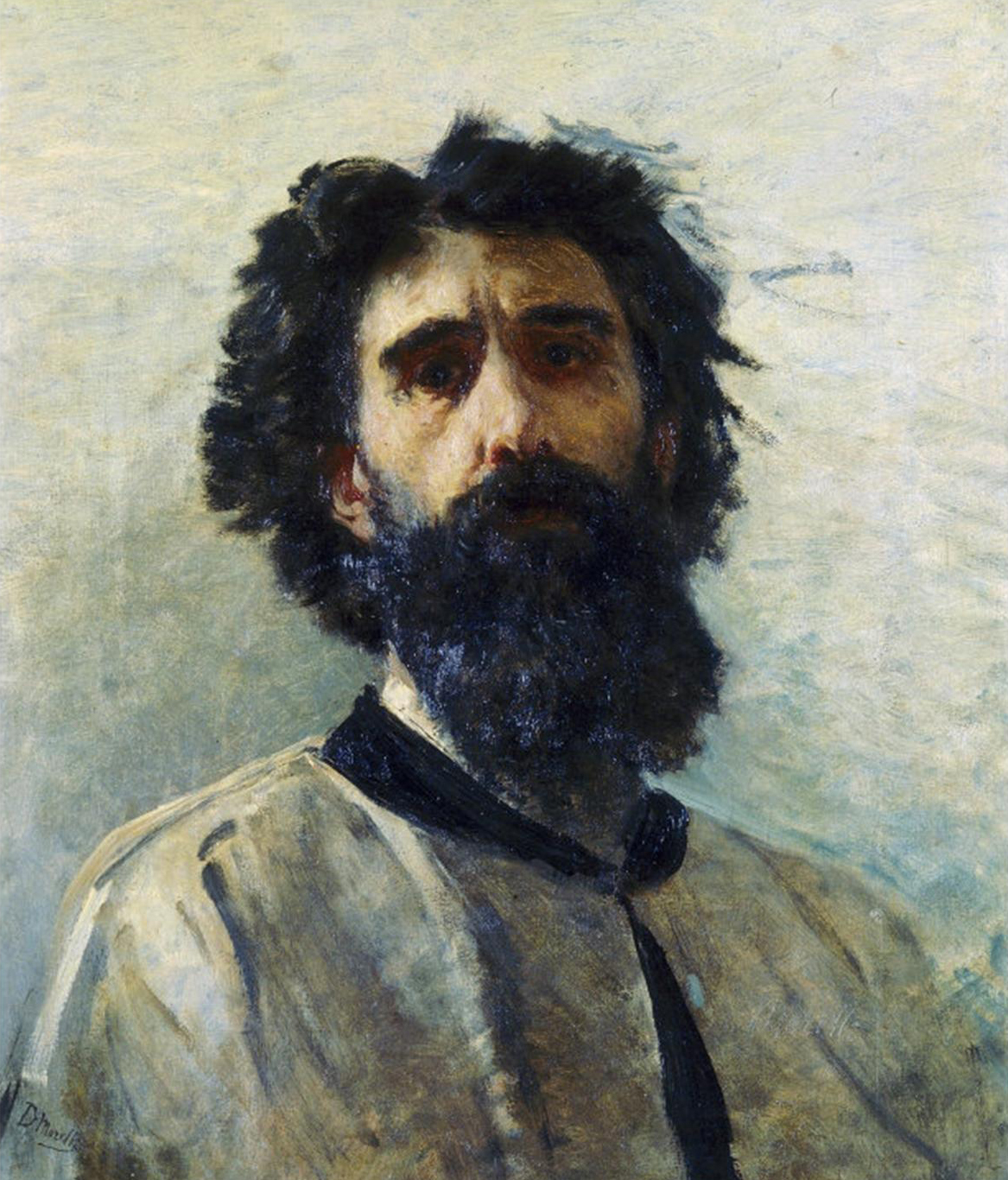
Self-portrait (date unknown)

Domenico Morelli (4 August 1823 – 13 August 1901) was an Italian painter, who mainly produced historical and religious works. Morelli was immensely influential in the arts of the second half of the 19th century, both as director of the Accademia di Belle Arti in Naples, but also because of his rebelliousness against institutions: traits that flourished into the passionate, often patriotic, Romantic and later Symbolist subjects of his canvases. Morelli was the teacher of Vincenzo Petrocelli, Ulisse Caputo, and Anselmo Gianfanti.

== Biography ==
He was born to a poor family in Naples. His mother had hoped he would become a priest. His precocious talent was noted, and he was enrolled at the Royal Academy of Fine Arts in Naples in 1836–1846, where he befriended Francesco Altamura. His early works contain imagery drawn from the Medieval stories and Romantic poets such as Byron. In 1845, he painted a prize-winning L' angelo che porta le anime al Purgatorio dantesco. In 1845–46, with the painting of Saul calmato da David, and help from a generous patron, the lawyer Ruggiero, he won a fellowship to study in Rome. In 1847–48, he painted Il corsaio and Una sfida di Trovatori, the prize-winning Bacio del Corsaro, and Goffredo a cui appare l'angelo. In 1847 at Rome, he painted a Madonna che culla il bambino, aiutata da San Giovanni.

Morelli had just returned to Naples when the insurrections of 1848 erupted in Naples. He joined the protesters in the barricades on via Toledo, and was wounded, nearly killed, and briefly imprisoned. In a retrospective published after his death, Isabella Anderton would label Domenico as one of the warrior artists of Italy, a group which also included Filippo Palizzi, Telemaco Signorini, Stefano Ussi, and Francesco Saverio Altamura.

Released, Morelli returned to Rome. He painted Van der Welt in mezzo ai corsari sopra una via romita (1851) and Cesare Borgia a Capita in mezzo ad una folla di fanciulle.

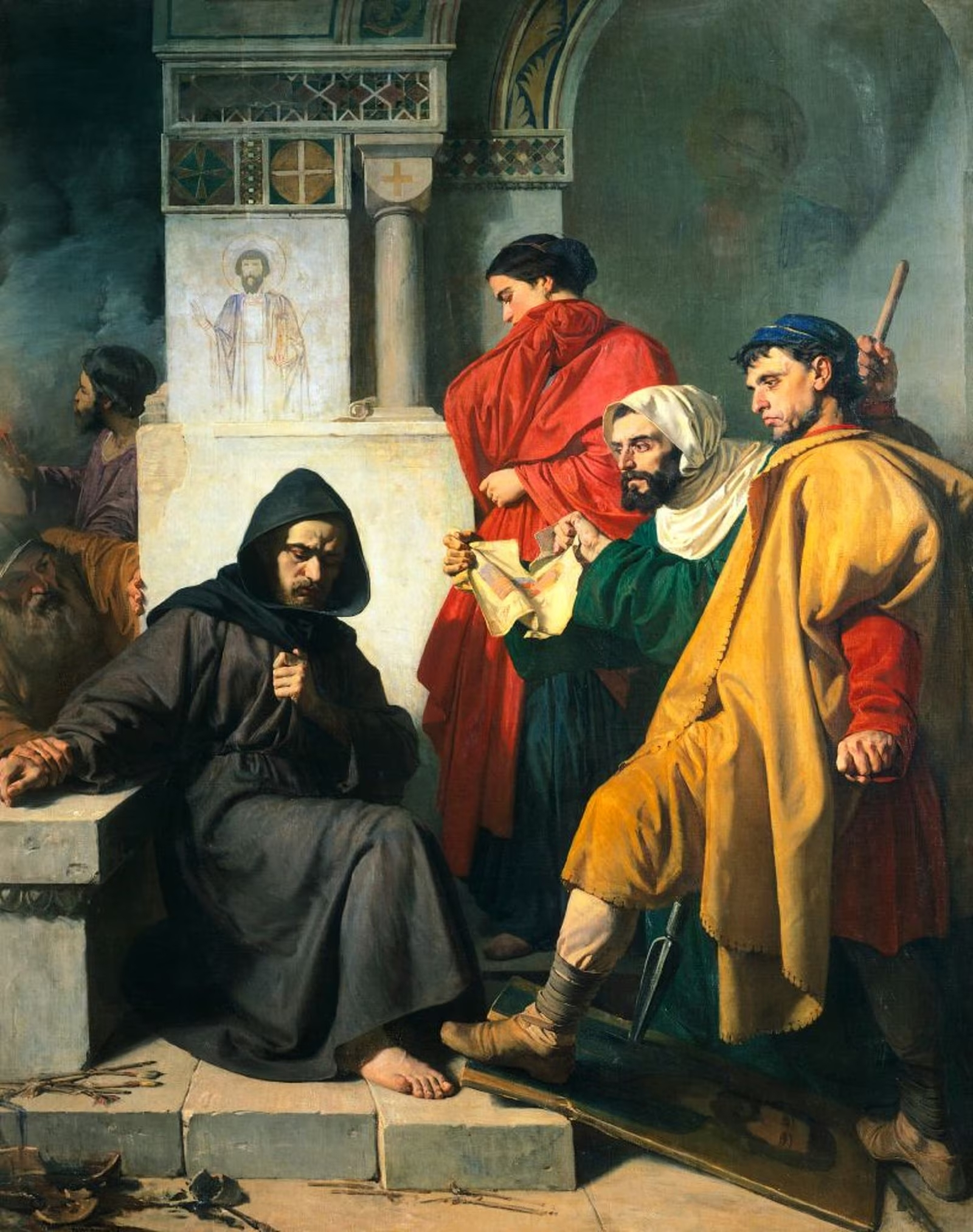
The Iconoclasts

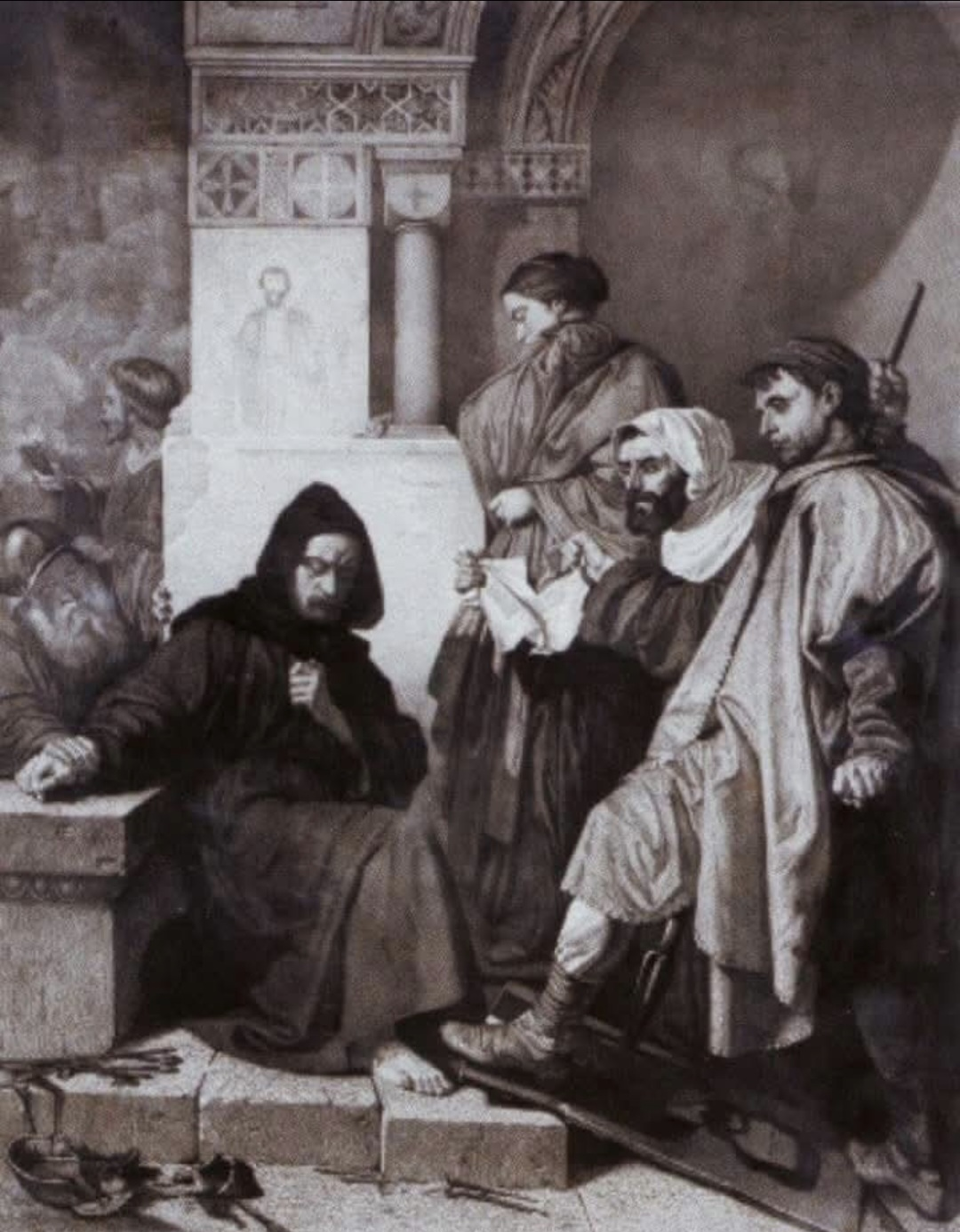
Gl'Iconoclasti, etching by Francesco Di Bartolo after Morelli’s The Iconoclasts.

In 1855 at the Florentine Exposition, he displayed his famous The Iconoclasts. The painting was later translated into etching by the Sicilian engraver and painter Francesco Di Bartolo, a friend and colleague of Morelli within the Neapolitan artistic circle. Di Bartolo’s etching Gl'Iconoclasti gave the composition a wide circulation in print and contributed to the public reputation of Morelli’s painting. Di Bartolo also etched Morelli's portrait.

Morelli participated in the Universal Exposition in Paris in 1855. More than twenty years later, in 1878, he was again involved in the Paris Universal Exposition, together with Francesco Di Bartolo and the sculptor Giulio Monteverde, in the context of the Italian artistic representation promoted by Minister Majorana Calatabiano.

After the 1855 Paris Universal Exposition, he was in Florence, where he took an active part in the Macchiaioli discussions on Realism. Morelli claimed that it was these discussions that made his own work less academic and helped him to develop a freer style and to experiment with colour. In this period, he is grouped into the school of Realism.

In 1857, he won a contest to design the decoration of the Church of San Francesco of Gaeta, a project never completed. On a trip to Milan, he painted Count di Ijara, Pompeian Bath, and a Madonna Addolorata. By 1857, he had returned to Naples, painting a Torquato Tasso. For the ceiling of the Royal chapel of Naples, he painted an Assumption of the Virgin.

He was also involved in the Società Promotrice di Belle Arti in Naples, founded in 1861 under the first presidency of his friend Filippo Palizzi, as part of the effort to promote contemporary art outside the traditional academic framework.

He was appointed consultant for new acquisitions of the Capodimonte art museum in Naples and, thus, had a significant impact on the subsequent direction of the collections.

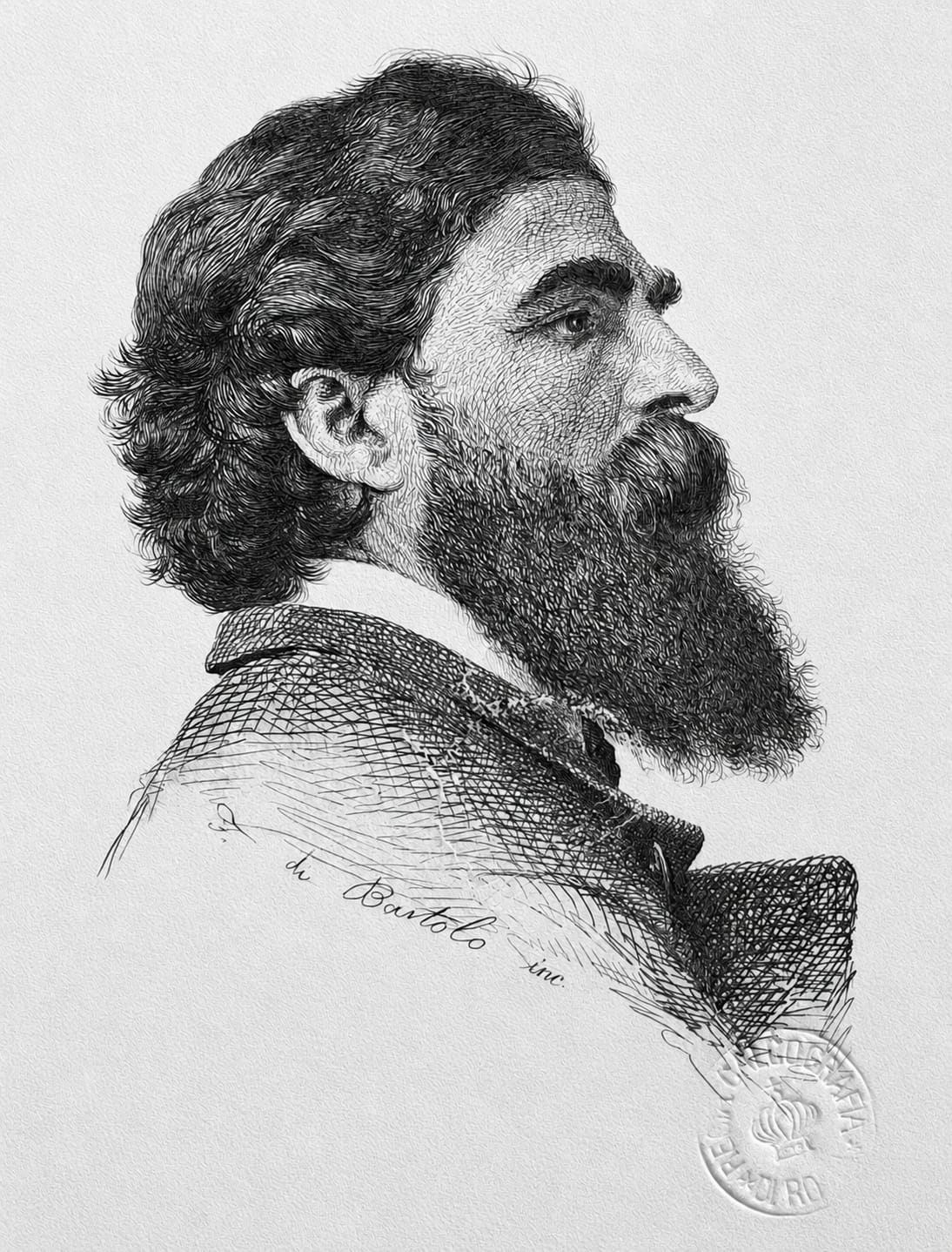
Domenico Morelli, portrait etching by Francesco Di Bartolo

In 1868, Morelli became a professor of painting at his old Academy, which now became the Royal Institute of Fine Arts in Naples. From that period onward, his interest turned to religious and mystical themes, drawn from mostly Christian, but also Jewish and Muslim traditions. Perhaps best known from this period is the Assumption on the ceiling of the Royal Palace in Naples. Morelli was also one of the collaborators for the illustrations of the Amsterdam Bible in 1895. From 1899 until his death, he was president of the Royal Academy of Fine Arts in Naples.

Morelli, late in life, won many awards and distinctions. He was named honorary professor of the principal academies of Italy and Europe, commendatore of the Order of SS. Maurizio e Lazzaro and of the Order of the Crown of Italy, and cavaliere dell' Ordine civile di Savoia. In June 1886, he was knighted a senator by the King. He died on 13 August 1901 in Naples.

Among his many pupils were Giuseppe Costa, Francesco Paolo Michetti, Vittorio Matteo Corcos, Giuseppe Boschetto, Camillo Miola, Edoardo Tofano, Antonio Mancini, Vincenzo Montefusco and Enrico Salfi. Morelli designed the frescoes painted for the tomb of Giacomo Leopardi, located in the church of San Vitale, Naples, at Fuorigrotta, but they were completed posthumously by his son-in-law, Paolo Vetri.

== Gallery ==
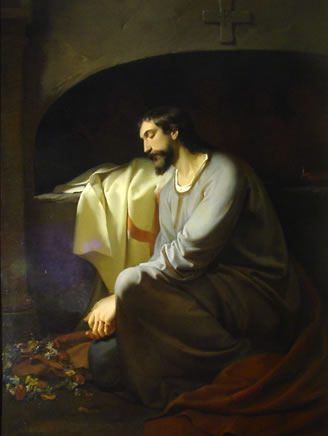
Neophyte, 1851

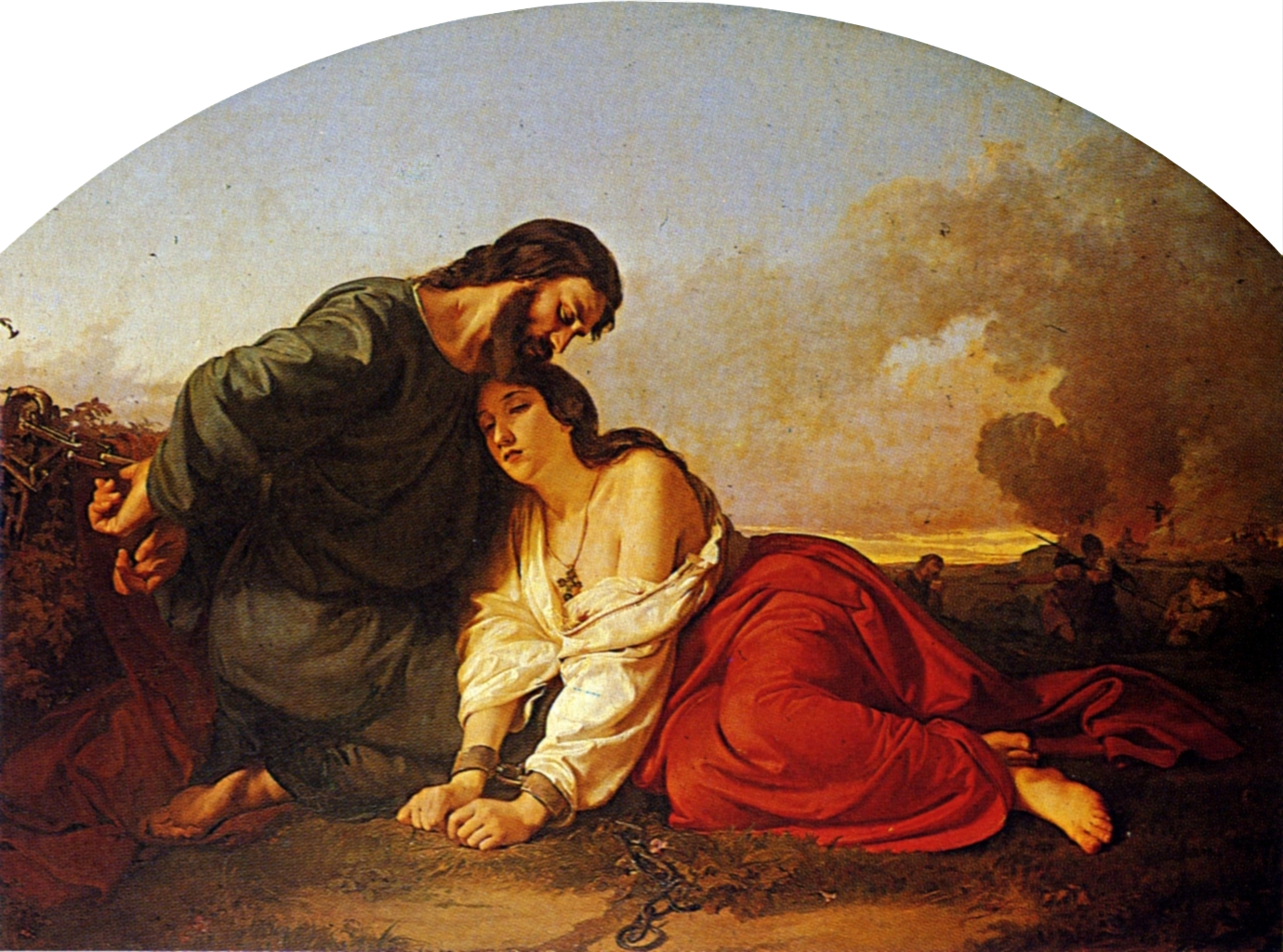
Christian Martyrs, 1851

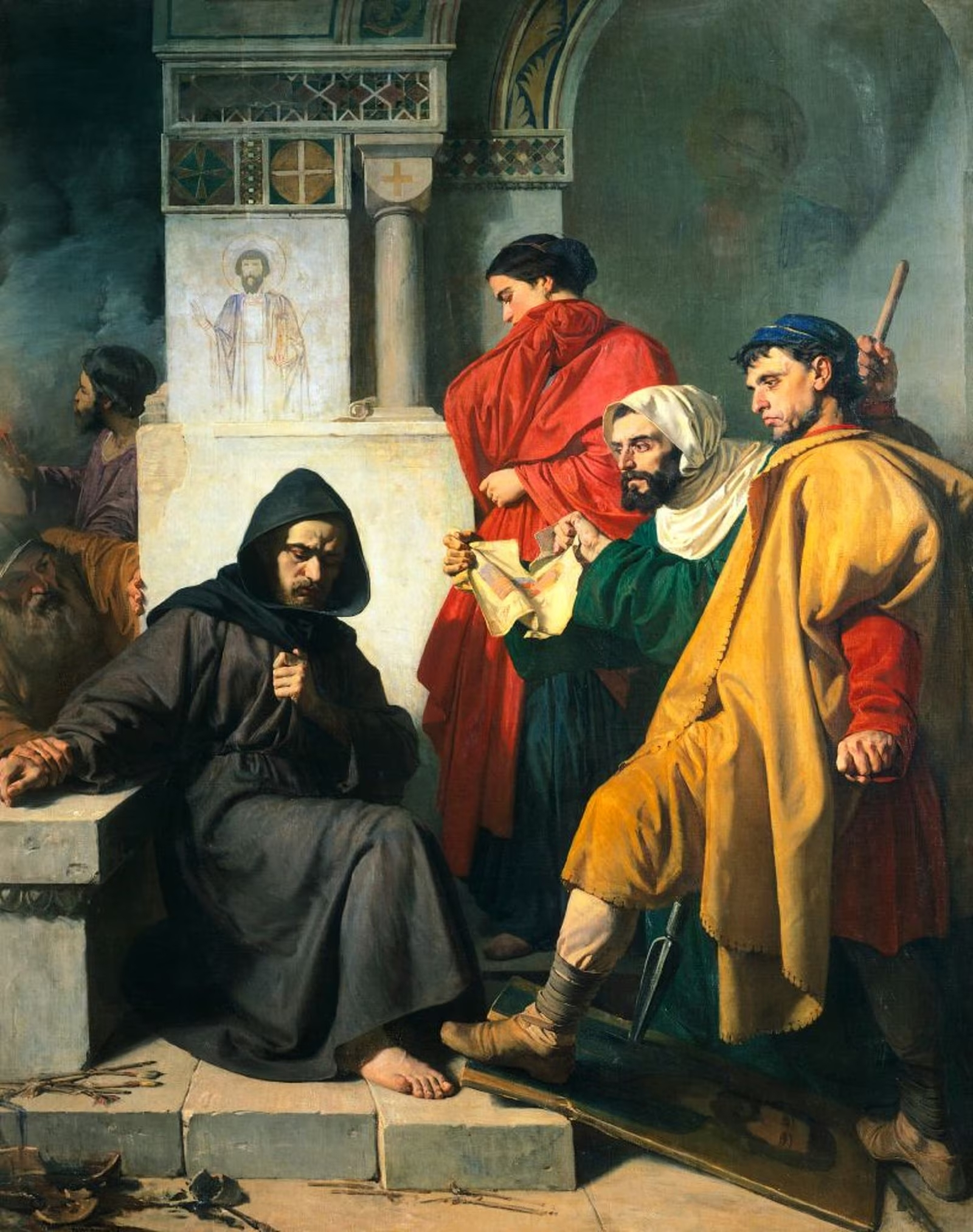
The Iconoclasts, 1855

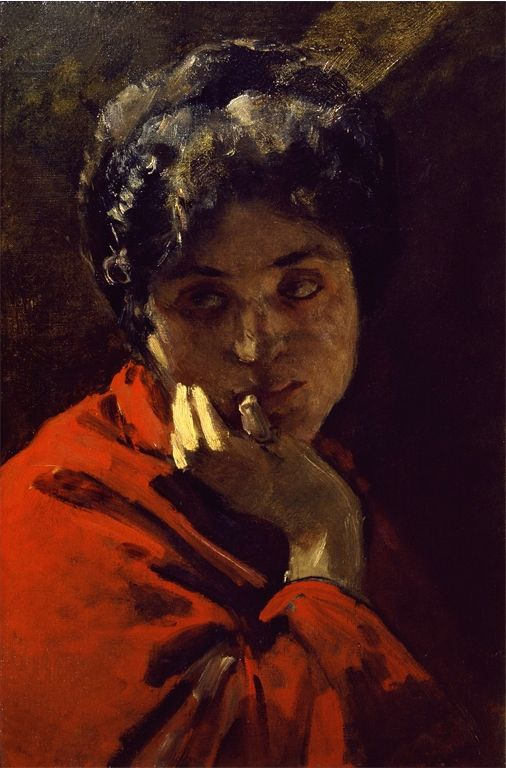
Girl in Red, 1855

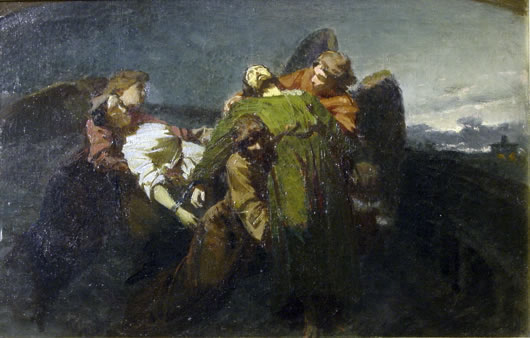
Angels carry Martyrs, 1855

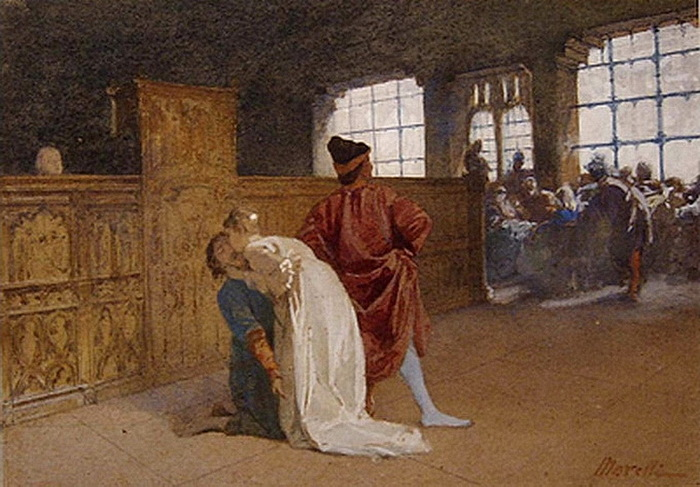
Guinevere kisses Lancelot

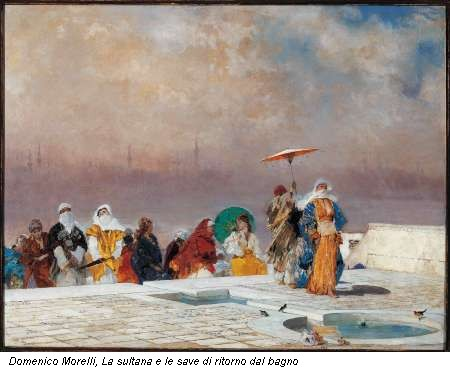
Sultan's wife returns
from the Bath

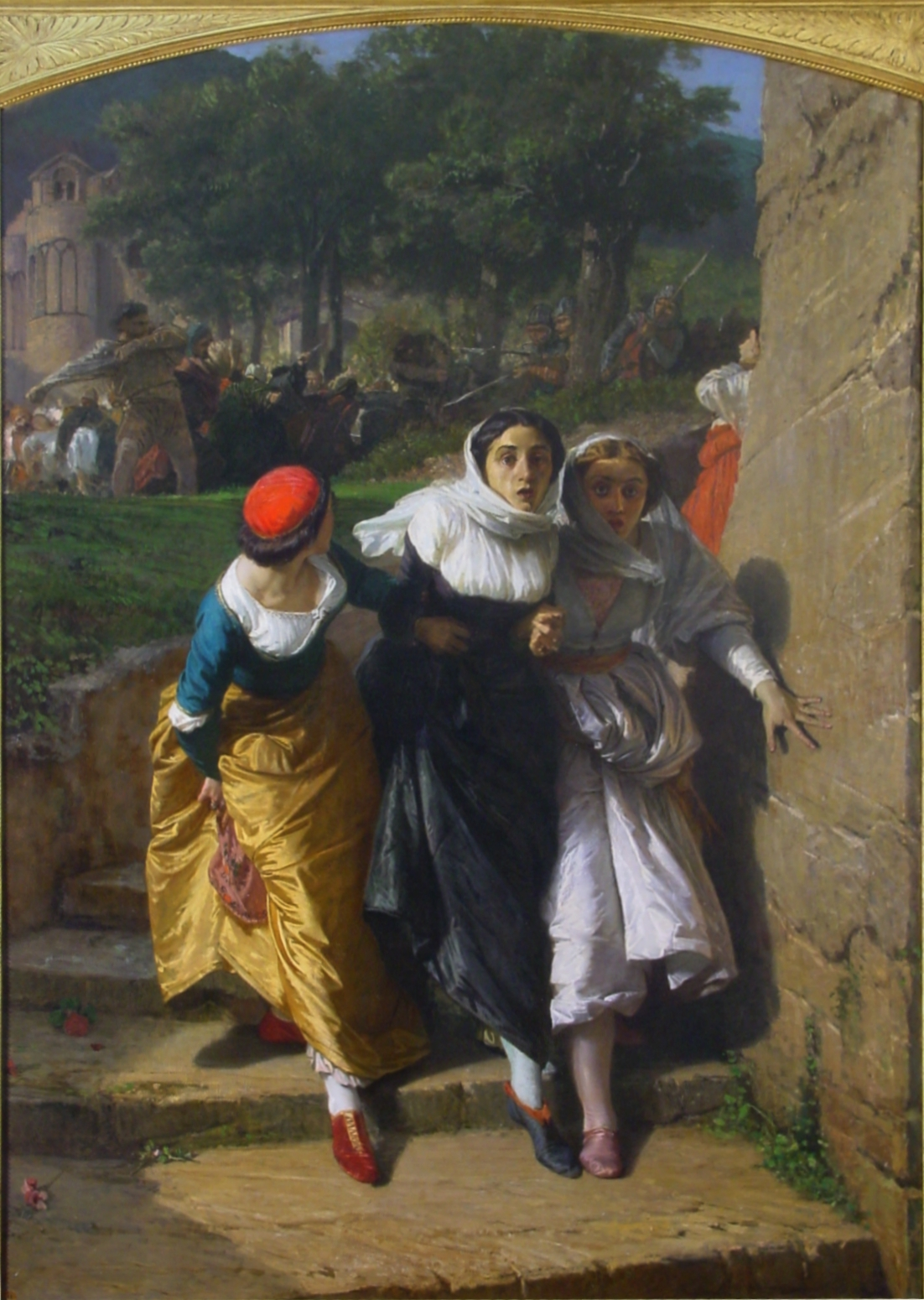
Sicilian Vespers

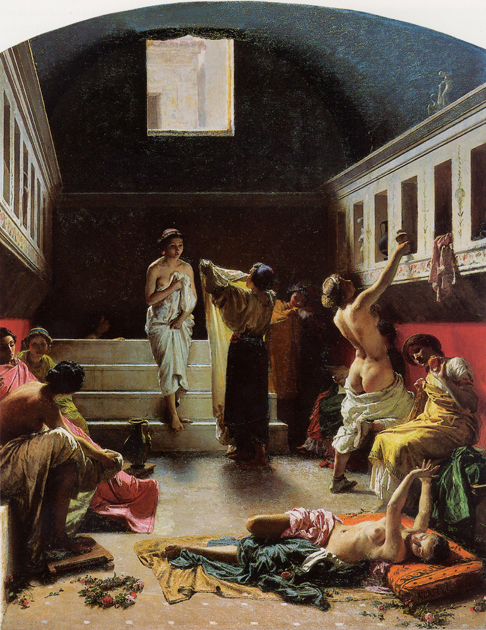
Pompeian Bath, 1861

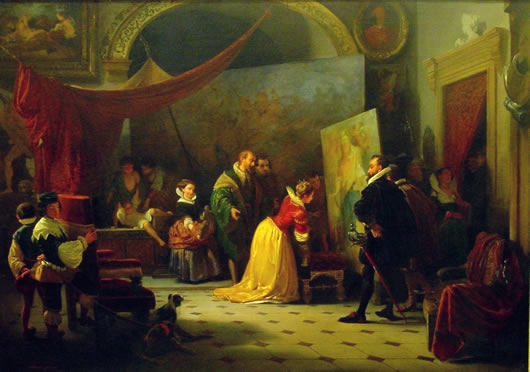
Maria De Medici visits
Ruben's studio, 1861

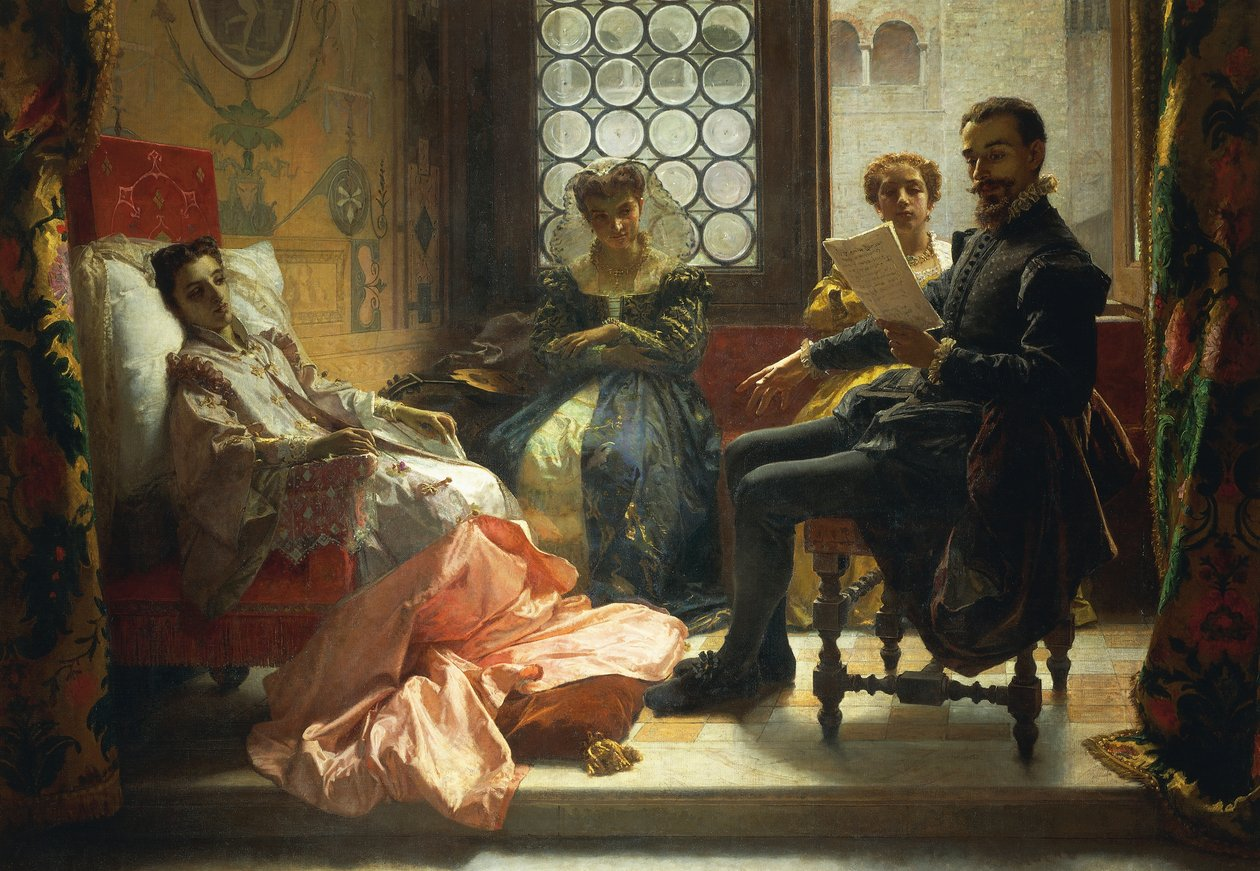
Tasso reads his poem
to Eleonora d'Este, 1865

Gemini, 1870s

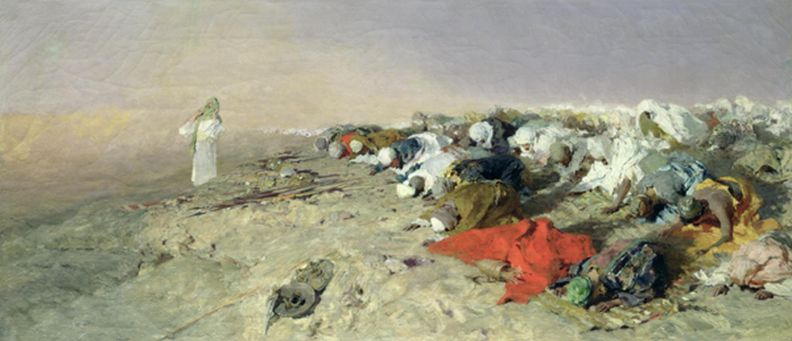
Sermon of Mohammed, 1890s

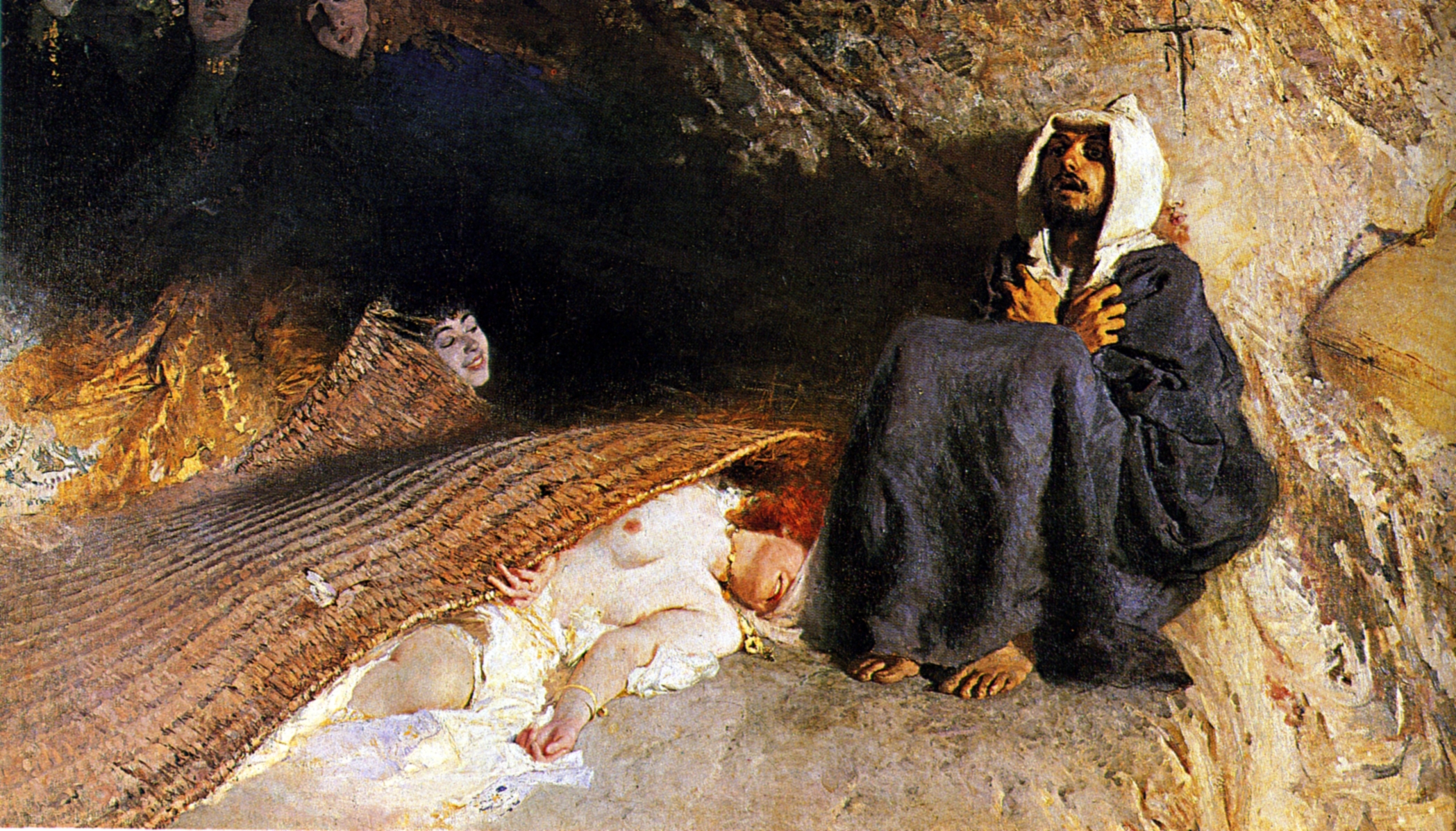
Temptation of St Anthony

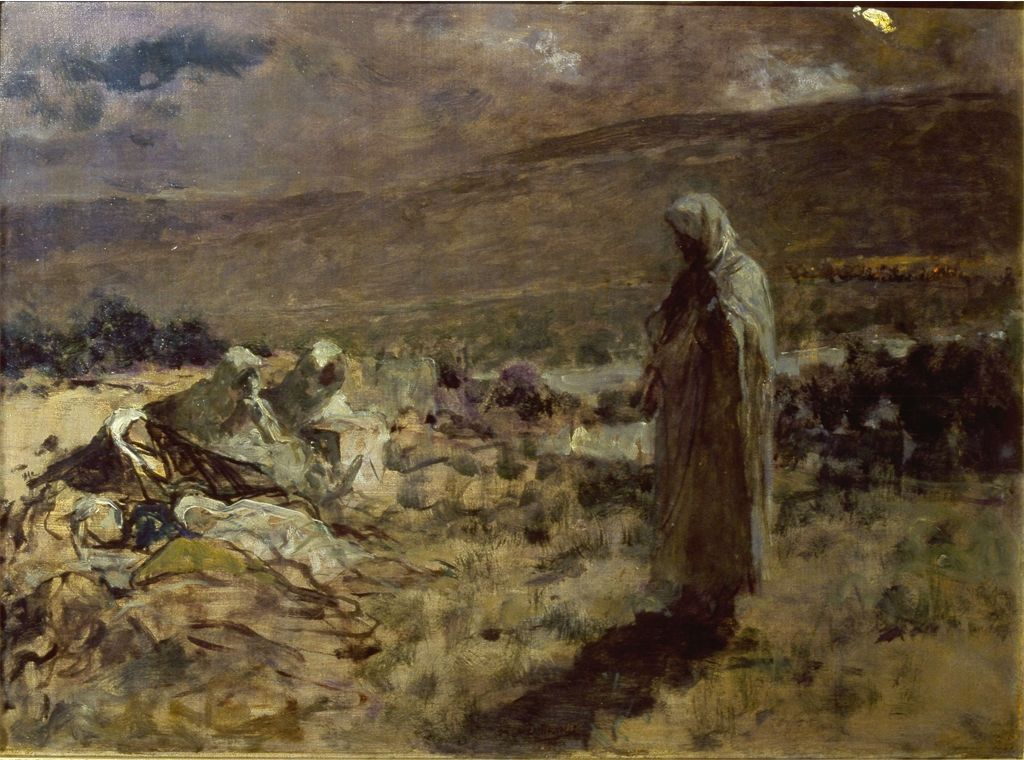
Christ watches over the Apostles, 1891

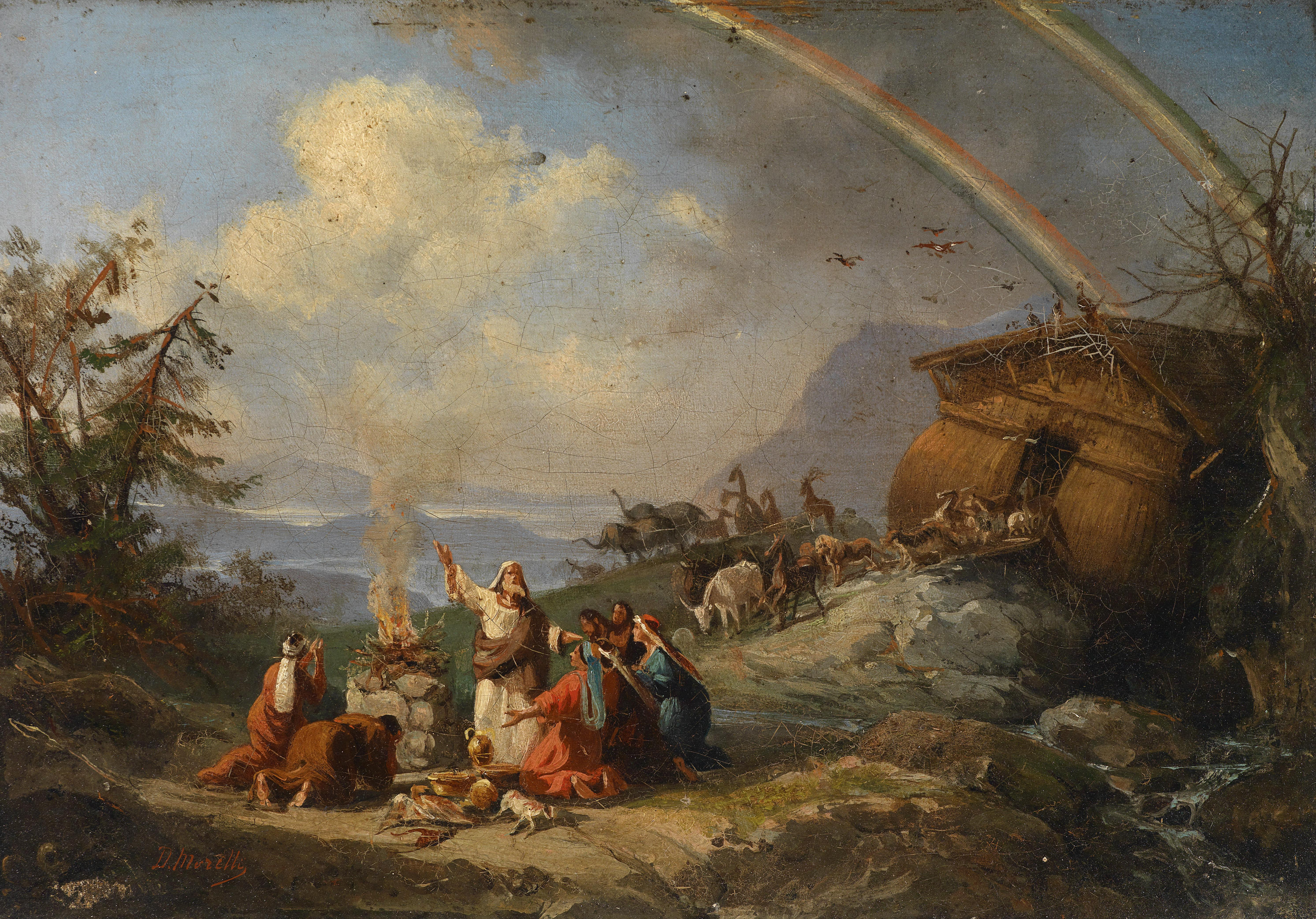
Noah gives Thanks for Deliverance, 1901

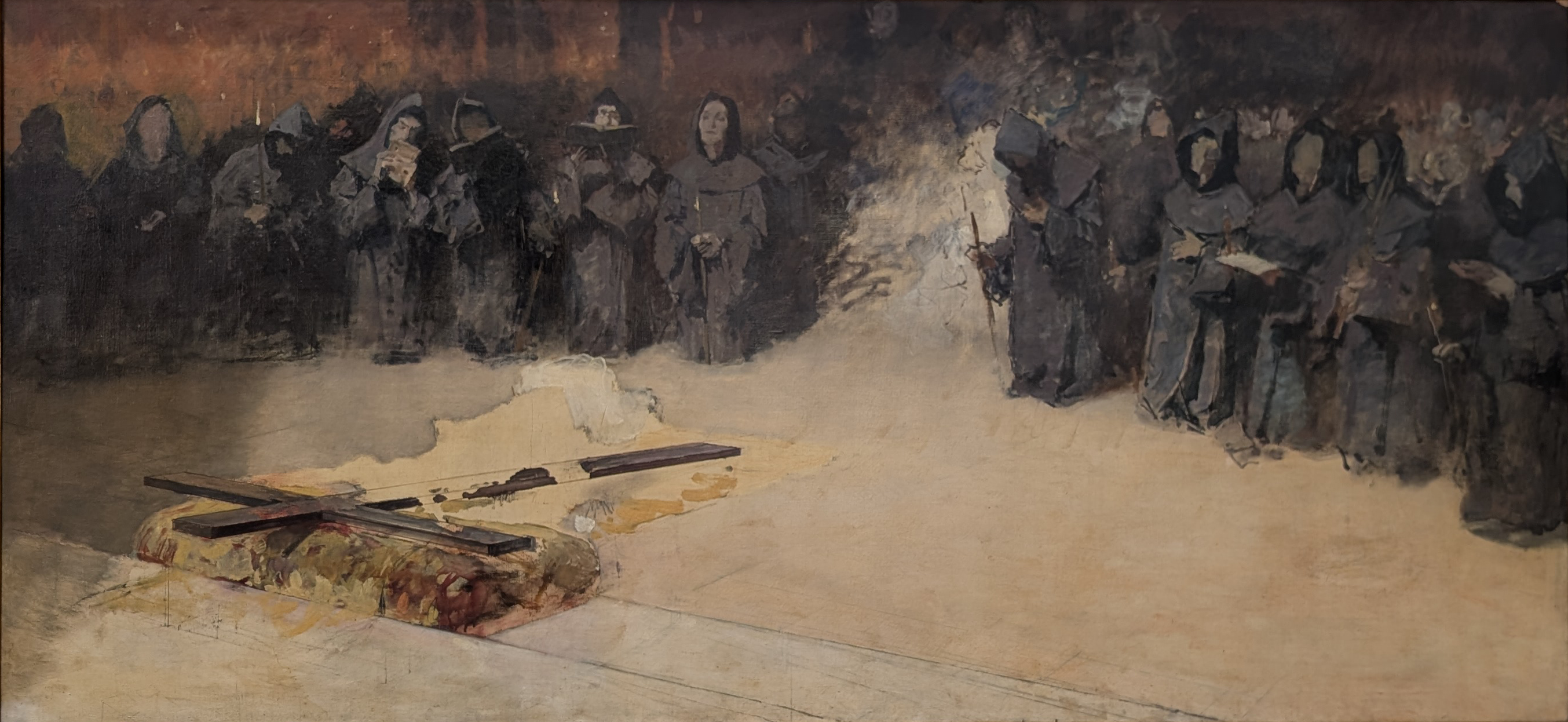
The Monks (Good Friday), 1880

== Sources ==
- Willard, Ashton Rollins (1895). A sketch of the life and work of the painter Domenico Morelli. Cambridge, MA, USA: The Riverside Press, Houghton, Mifflin, and Company.
- Di Bartolo, Natalia. "Francesco Di Bartolo (1826-1913), engraver and painter: corpus of studies and essays for the bicentenary of birth". OperaeOpera.
