= Palizzi (surname) =

Palizzi is an Italian surname. Notable people with the surname include:

- Francesco Paolo Palizzi (1825 - 1871), Italian painter
- Filippo Palizzi (1818 – 1899), Italian painter
- Giuseppe Palizzi (1812- 1888), Italian-born French painter
- Nicola Palizzi (1820 - 1870), Italian painter

== See also ==
- Palizzi
