= Raimondo Scoppa =

Italian painter (1820–1890)

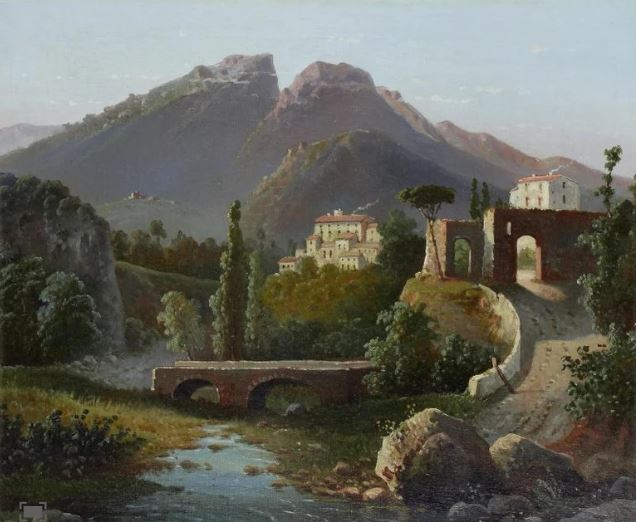
Hill Town in an Italian Landscape

Raimondo Scoppa (March 22, 1820, Naples – after 1890) was an Italian painter of historical subjects and landscapes.

== Life and work ==
He attended the Accademia di Belle Arti in Naples, where he studied with Gabriele Smargiassi, one of the leaders of the School of Posillipo. His debut came at the Bourbon Exhibition of 1841, with a view of the main pier at the Port of Naples. He would be a regular participant in the biennial exhibitions from 1843 to 1859, the final one held before Italian Unification.

The most notable works he exhibited include The Ideal Battle (1851), set in the late Middle Ages, The Prayer in the Garden (1855), and Bice led to the Castle of Rosate (1859), a painting inspired by Marco Visconti, a novel by Tommaso Grossi. It was awarded a gold medal and is now kept at the Palazzo del Circolo della Stampa .

He also painted The Cliff of Capo d'Urso (1854), commissioned by the Bourbon King Ferdinand II, and now in the Royal Palace of Naples.

During his later years, he focused on seascapes and historical landscapes with contemporary additions. From 1862 to 1884 he was a regular exhibitor at the "Society for the Promotion of the Fine Arts", as well as at exhibitions in Florence, Milan, Genoa and Turin. His son Gustavo also became a landscape painter.
