= Giovanni Giorgio =

Giovanni Giorgio may refer to:

- Giovanni Giorgio Moroder, an Italian record producer
- Giovanni Di Giorgio (1914–1992), an Italian painter
- Gian Giorgio Trissino (equestrian), an Italian horse rider
- John George, Marquess of Montferrat
