= Francesco Pénna =

Italian sculptor

Francesco Pénna (9 April 1865 – 1927) was an Italian sculptor.

== Biography ==
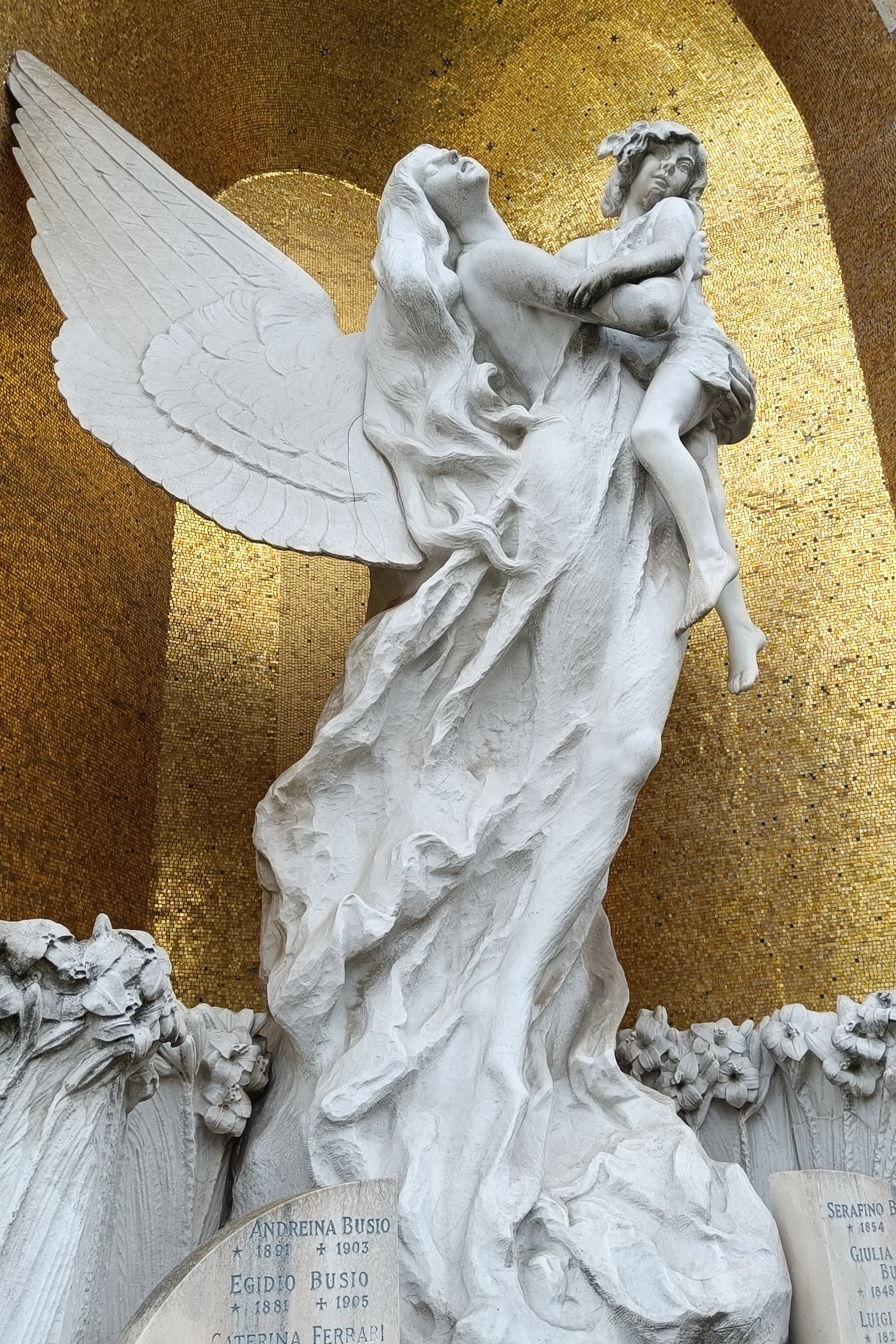
Francesco Penna, Lily in the sky, Monument Elisi, 1916, Monumental cimitery, Milan

Born in Naples, he completed his studies at the Institute of Fine Arts of Naples, where he won a variety of contests, and dedicated himself to industrial sculptural art in terra cotta and ceramic, working mostly from Rome and Milan. He garnered prizes for this at the Exhibition of Melbourne, Australia, and in Buenos Aires, Argentina. At the first of these Exhibitions, he sent large chalices in ceramic and terracotta. Additionally, to New Orleans, Louisiana he sent a small sculpture depicting The Orphan of Casamicciola, which won a gold medal. Many of his works were sold in Buenos Aires. His Alcestis Revived (1912) is in the Galleria d'arte Moderna of Milan. He also made portraits and funeral monuments.
