= Valerico Laccetti =

Italian painter and dramatist (1836–1909)

- Laccetti in 1895
- Born: June 18, 1836; Vasto, Kingdom of the Two Sicilies
- Died: March 8, 1909 (aged 72); Rome, Italy
- Other name: Valerio Laccetti
- Education: Royal Academy of Fine Arts, Naples
- Known for: Animal, genre and landscape painting; history painting
- Notable work: Christus imperat

Valerico Laccetti or Valerio Laccetti (June 18, 1836 – March 8, 1909) was an Italian painter of animals, rural genre scenes, and landscapes, and later of history subjects, who in his last years also wrote plays. He won a medal for art at the 1873 Vienna World's Fair, and was made a knight and later a commander of the Order of the Crown of Italy. His best-known work, the history painting Christus imperat, hangs in the Palazzo della Provincia e della Prefettura in Chieti.

== Early life and training ==
Laccetti was born in Vasto on June 18, 1836, the son of Antonio Laccetti, a section leader in the king's guard of honour, and Glafira Mayo. In 1853, aged seventeen, he enrolled at the Royal Academy of Fine Arts in Naples, where he studied drawing with Giuseppe Mancinelli. He won the prize for perspective at the Naples exhibition of 1855 and, in 1856, third prize in the academy's final competition with Ajax the Lesser Saves Himself from the Storm. He completed his training with Filippo Palizzi, who turned him towards painting from life and towards animal subjects.

== Career ==
=== Naples and Rome ===
Laccetti made his debut at the first Italian national exhibition in Florence in 1861. At the first exhibition of the Promotrice di belle arti in Naples in 1862 he showed Il tarlo, and the next year a painting of figures and animals shown there was bought by King Victor Emmanuel II; it is now in the Museo di Capodimonte. He moved to Rome in 1863, where his studies of animals in the Roman Campagna sold well, particularly to foreign buyers. He displayed Dog and Cat in a Stall and Cow in a Stall at the Mostre degli Amatori e Cultori. In 1870 at the Promotrice of Naples, he displayed Remembrance of Fontainebleau and Colosseum at Sunrise in Autumn. He exhibited at the Roman Exhibitions until 1902, including The Prayer, Catechism in the Countryside (1881), The Winter, New and Old Soldiers, and Le gioie della famiglia (1885). He exhibited often at the Neapolitan Promotrice (1871, 1873, 1874, 1879).

=== Paris and Vienna ===
In 1872 Laccetti spent seven months in Paris as the guest of Giuseppe Palizzi, and became a friend of Thomas Couture. His Souvenir de Fontainebleau, which shows the influence of the Barbizon school, was sold at the Naples Promotrice. At the 1873 Vienna World's Fair he displayed three canvases depicting peasants at work, and won a medal. Lauriti names two of them, Il ritorno dal lavoro (The return from work) and Un parasole in pericolo (A parasol in danger), as the pictures that earned the medal. At the Paris Salon of 1875, where the catalogue listed him as a pupil of Palizzi, he exhibited Pendant l'orage and Après l'orage, and at the Salon of 1876 La Campagna di Roma nel mese di giugno and Un moderno Orfeo. The success of these pictures earned him the knight's cross of the Order of the Crown of Italy.

=== Figure and history painting ===
From 1875 Laccetti also painted life-size figures, among them La vedova and La ragazza, and in 1878 Una madre che scherza con il bambino, which won a silver medal in Rome. At the national exposition of Naples in 1877 he displayed Solo!, Campagna romana, and La civiltà fuga l'ignoranza (Civilization banishes Ignorance), which was reprised at the next year's Paris International Exposition.

Christus imperat, Palazzo della Provincia e della Prefettura, Chieti

Around 1880 he turned to history painting, influenced by Domenico Morelli. He spent four years on Christus imperat, a large canvas set in the Baths of Caracalla that represents the victory of Christianity over paganism. It was exhibited in Rome, and in Turin at the Esposizione generale italiana of 1884. The provincial council of Chieti bought it in 1885, and the city made him an honorary citizen and struck a gold medal in his honour. He was made a commander of the Order of the Crown of Italy and a member of the Academy of Bologna. The painting, measuring 3.32 by 4.95 m, hangs in the Palazzo della Provincia e della Prefettura in Chieti.

His only picture at the 1887 National Exhibition in Venice was Animali, a small painting of sheep and a donkey, which L'Illustrazione Italiana reproduced as an engraving. Christus vincit, a forest landscape with a convent, nuns and a woman at the foot of a crucifix, was shown in Rome in 1890–91. He continued to exhibit landscapes and animal pictures with the Società degli amatori e cultori in Rome, showing Campagna romana and Effetto di un fulmine in 1900 and Un filosofo in 1902. He also made drawings for Vincenzo Bindi's Monumenti storici ed artistici degli Abruzzi (1889).

=== Plays ===
In his last years Laccetti wrote for the stage. He published the historical drama Arrigo VIII re e papa (Lanciano, 1902) and the tragedy Francesco d'Assisi (Rome, 1906).

== Death ==
Laccetti died in Rome on March 8, 1909.

== Selected works ==
- Figure ed animali (1863) – Museo di Capodimonte, Naples
- Souvenir de Fontainebleau (1872) – sold at the Naples Promotrice
- Il ritorno dal lavoro and Un parasole in pericolo – Vienna, 1873
- Pendant l'orage and Après l'orage – Paris Salon, 1875
- La vedova and La ragazza – Rome, 1875
- La civiltà fuga l'ignoranza – Naples, 1877; Paris, 1878
- Christus imperat, oil on canvas, 332 × 495 cm – Palazzo della Provincia e della Prefettura, Chieti
- Le gioie della famiglia (1885)
- Animali – Venice, 1887
- Christus vincit – Rome, 1890–91
- Campagna romana and Effetto di un fulmine – Rome, 1900
- Un filosofo – Rome, 1902
- Portrait of his father Antonio, a pastoral scene, and a landscape with a buffalo – Museo Civico, Palazzo d'Avalos, Vasto

== Gallery ==
Portrait of Archbishop Luigi Maria De Marinis (1856–57)

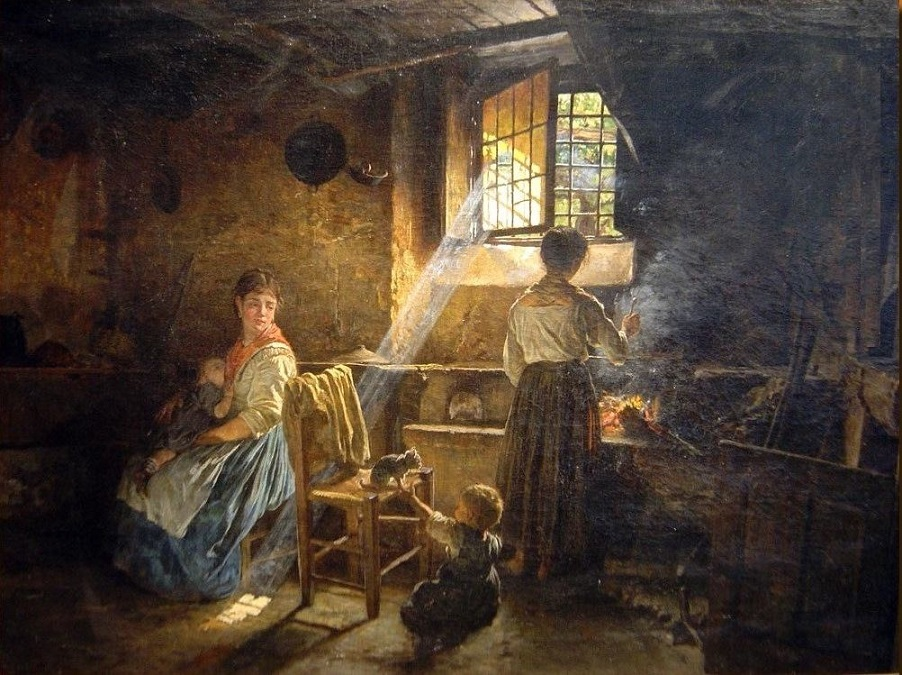
Le gioie della famiglia (1885), private collection

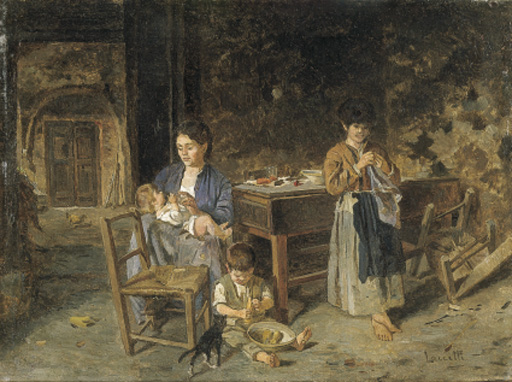
Little family indoors
