= Alfonso Simonetti =

Italian painter (1840–1892)

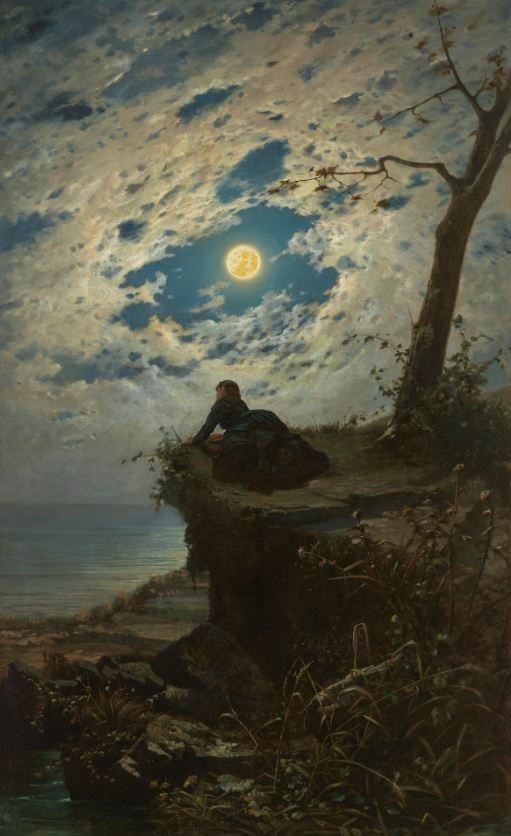
"And She Never Returned"

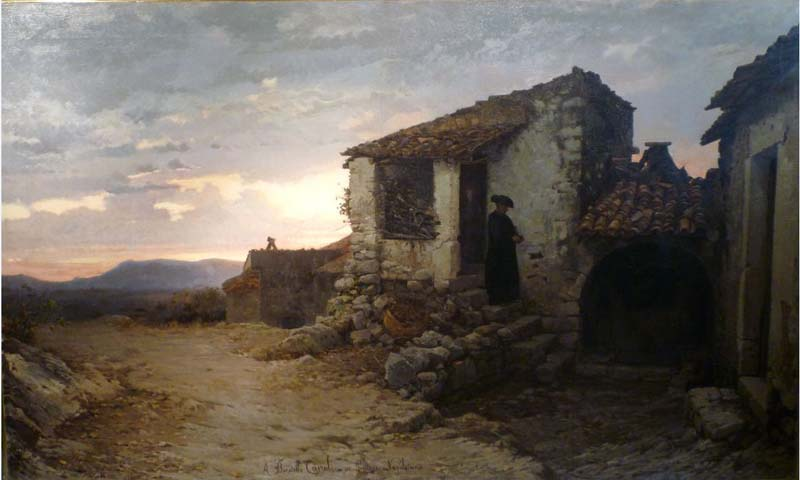
Rustic Houses in Castrocielo

Alfonso Simonetti (29 December 1840 – 22 August 1892) was an Italian painter of historical scenes, portraits and landscapes; best known for his works with moonlight and sunset effects.

== Life and work ==
Simonetti was born in Naples, Italy, to the painter Giuseppe Simonetti (fl. 1840–1864) and his wife Vincenza, née Piccirillo. In 1859, he enrolled at the Royal Academy of Fine Arts, where he studied under Gabriele Smargiassi and Giuseppe Mancinelli. His debut came in 1862, at the Society for the Promotion of Fine Arts, with his depiction of the mercenary soldier, Ettore Fieramosca, at Mount Gargano. Two years later, he was awarded a scholarship to study in Florence. In 1873, he was commissioned to paint a portrait of Giuseppe Verdi.

Shortly after, he returned to Naples and, in 1877, exhibited two major works: Without Hope, She is Dead and The Last Ray. At the 1880 Exposition Artistica of Turin, he exhibited Malaria and Serenade. In honor of his former teacher, he painted a street scene of the Via Giuseppe Mancinelli, which was later exhibited in Paris at the Exposition Universelle (1889). He was represented at the opening of the Palazzo delle Esposizioni in Rome by a large landscape called Sunset (1883). Two more landscapes were shown at the Fine Arts Exhibition in Venice (1887): My Lord Forest and Harvesting Olive Trees.

He also exhibited outside of Italy. At the Italian Exposition of London, he displayed Forest; Countryside of Castrocielo, and the historical canvas: Gutenberg, Faust and Coeffer print the first page of the Bible. In Melbourne, Australia, he exhibited Costume of Castrocielo.

Three of his major canvases are displayed at the Pinacoteca of the Museo di Capodimonte: Winter Morning; Street in Castrocielo, and the portrait Tired. His works may also be seen at the Galleria dell'Accademia and the Galleria d'arte moderna in Florence.

He was appointed an honorary professor at the Accademia in 1872, and was named a Knight of the Order of the Crown of Italy.
