= Cesare Uva =

Italian painter (1824–1886)

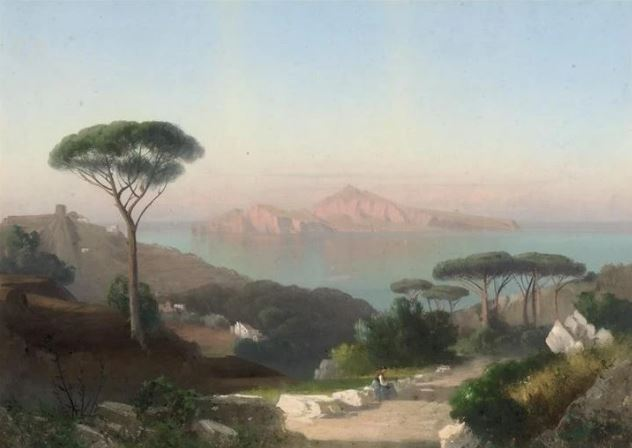
Resting on the Road to Sorrento, gouache on paper

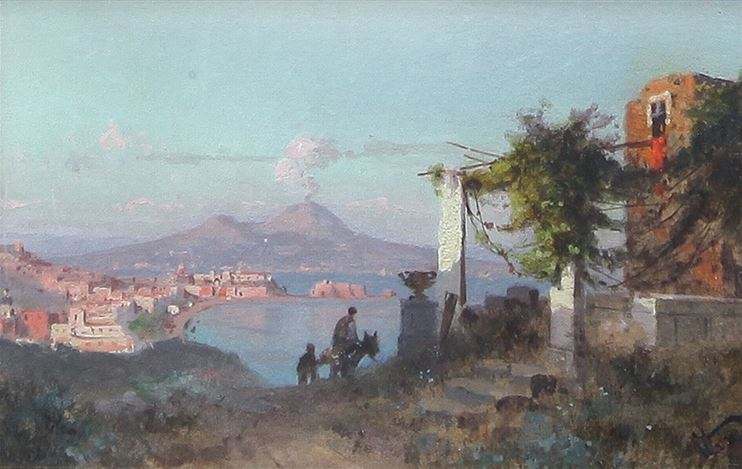
View of Vesuvius, gouache on paper

Cesare Uva (11 November 1824 – 16 February 1886) was an Italian landscape painter.

== Life and work ==
He was born in Avellino to Mariano Uva, an interior decorator, and his wife Lucia, née D'Argenio. His early display of artistic talent was strongly encouraged by his father. At the age of twenty-six, he moved to Naples, where he attended the Royal Academy of Fine Arts. His primary instructor there was Gabriele Smargiassi.

After graduating, he returned to his hometown and opened an art workshop and gave private lessons. Later, he went back to Naples and married Antonietta Andreani. They had no children.

In 1877, he worked on restoring the municipal theatre in Avellino. Two years after that, he and Giovanni Battista, a former student, opened an art workshop in Naples.

Most of his works were done in gouache or tempera on cardboard. He focused on landscapes with staffage, but also created vedute and some genre scenes. The majority of his paintings are on display in Avellino, or in private collections.

Uva died in 1886 in Naples.
