= Francesco Paolo Palizzi =

Italian painter (1825–1871)

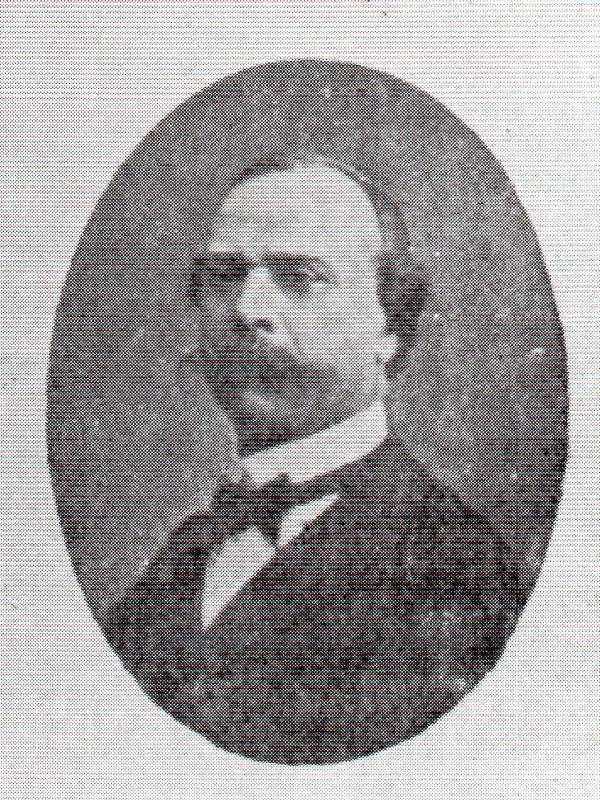
Francesco Paolo Palizzi (date unknown)

Francesco Paolo Palizzi (16 April 1825, Vasto - 16 March 1871, Naples), was an Italian painter, primarily known for landscapes.

== Biography ==
He was the eighth of nine children born to Antonio Palizzi, a lawyer, and his wife Doralice née Del Greco. They were all artistically inclined, and were occasionally referred to as the "Nine Muses". Three of his brothers, Giuseppe, Filippo and Nicola also became painters.

In 1845, he moved to Naples to enroll at the Academy of Fine Arts. There, he became a student of Camillo Guerra, who introduced him to history painting. He soon became more oriented towards landscapes and still lifes; influenced by the works of seventeenth and eighteenth century artists such as Paolo Porpora, Giuseppe Recco and Giovan Battista Ruoppolo. His brothers Filippo and Nicola also seem to have exerted some stylistic influence.

He spent 1856 painting in Lanciano. The following year, he joined his brother Giuseppe in Paris. There, he devoted himself to landscapes and had several showings at the Salon. In 1867 he, Giuseppe and Filippo exhibited at the Exposition Universelle.

In 1870, the Franco-Prussian War forced him to return to Italy, where he suddenly fell ill and died in 1871, aged only forty-five.

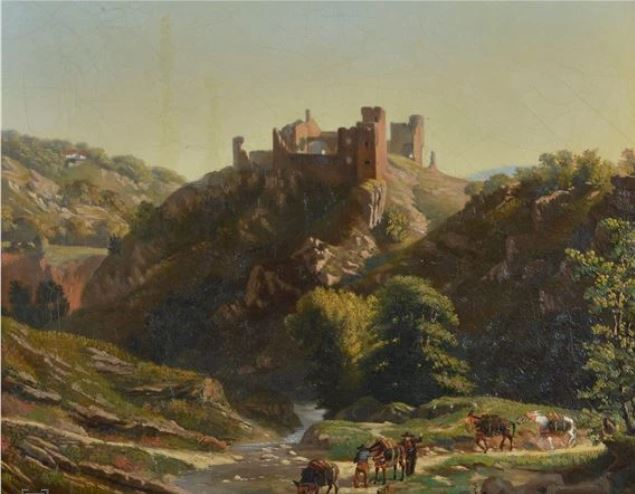
Caravan in the Countryside

Many of his works were lost, because he could take only a few when he left France. In 1898, Filippo donated them to the gallery at the academy. They constitute the largest single collection of his paintings.
