= Giuseppe Palizzi =

Italian painter (1812–1888)

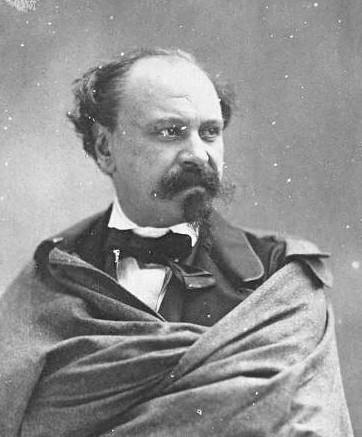
Giuseppe Palizzi (late 1850s), photograph by Nadar

Giuseppe Palizzi, or Joseph Palizzi (12 March 1812, Lanciano - 1 January 1888, Paris) was an Italian-born French painter of landscapes and rural genre scenes. His younger brothers, Filippo, Nicola and Francesco Paolo also became painters.

== Biography ==
He was the second son born to Antonio Palizzi, a lawyer, and his wife Doralice née Del Greco, an amateur musician. In 1835, he moved to Naples, to enroll at the Royal Institute of Fine Arts, where he initially studied with the Dutch-born landscape painter, Anton Sminck Pitloo, then with Gabriele Smargiassi. He exhibited in 1839 and 1841, with works that showed the influence of the School of Posillipo. He presented historical landscapes at the yearly shows, but strained relations with the academic world led him to leave Italy.

In 1844, he settled in Paris. There, he came into contact with members of the Barbizon School, and became one of the first Italian artists to paint in the Forest of Fontainebleau. He had several showings at the Salon during the 1840s, and exhibited at the Exposition Universelle of 1855. Later, he would return to Naples for an occasional exhibition.

He was named a Knight in the Legion of Honor in 1859. Three years later, he received the Cross of the Knights of the Order of Saints Maurice and Lazarus.

During this time, he established himself in the village of Marlotte, and acquired a workshop for his brother Filippo, in Grez-sur-Loing. With the approval of the forestry administration, he built another workshop in the forest, near the Gorge aux Loups, which was often shared, not only by him and Filippo, but Nicola as well; sometimes all together. In 1872 the painter Valerico Laccetti spent seven months in Paris as his guest.

The 1870s brought several changes, beginning with the death of Nicola and followed shortly after by the Franco-Prussian War. As the German troops were withdrawing, his brother Francesco Paolo died. During the following years, possibly in response, he gave up his Romantic painting style; depicting realistic scenes of villagers and animals.

He died on the first day of 1888, and was buried at the Père-Lachaise Cemetery. The City of Lanciano has named its municipal art school after him.

== Selected paintings ==
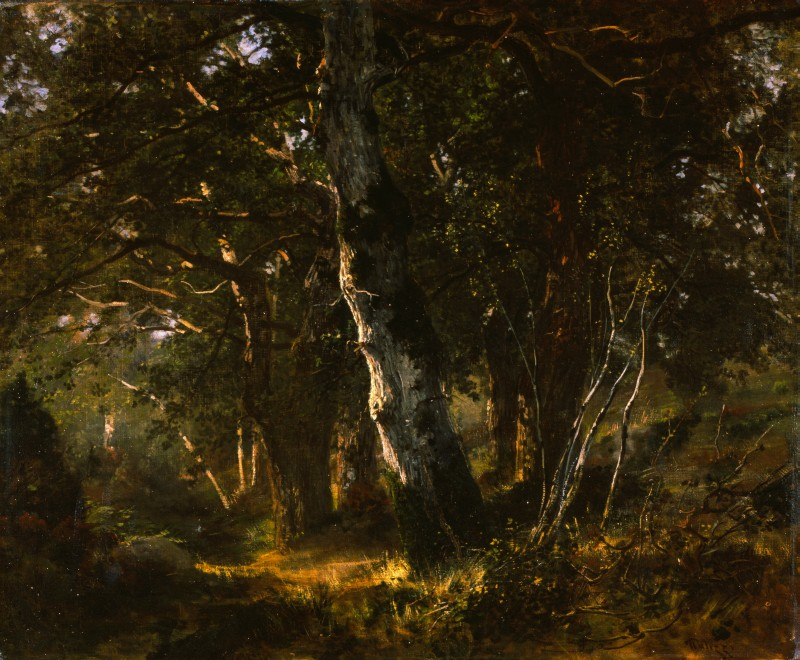
The Woods of Fontainebleau

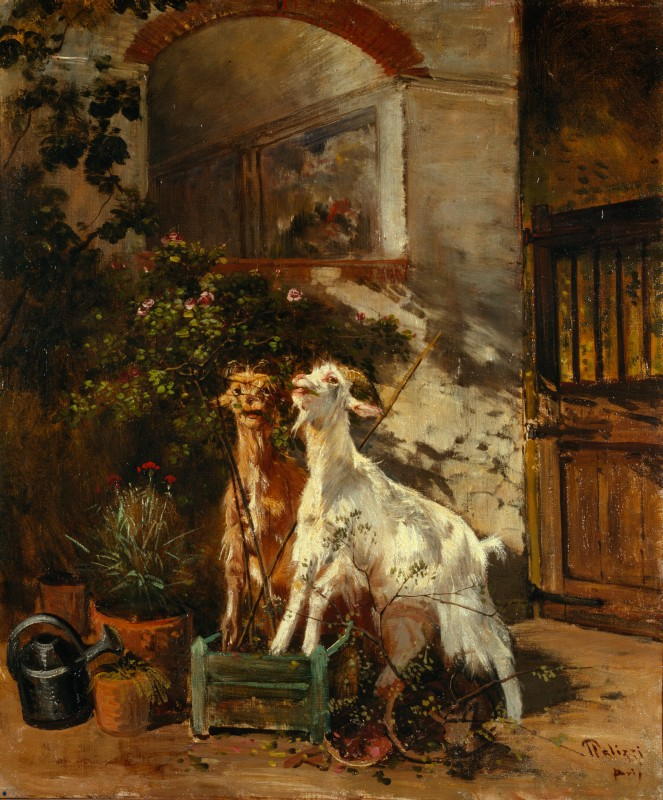
Goats Grazing on Roses

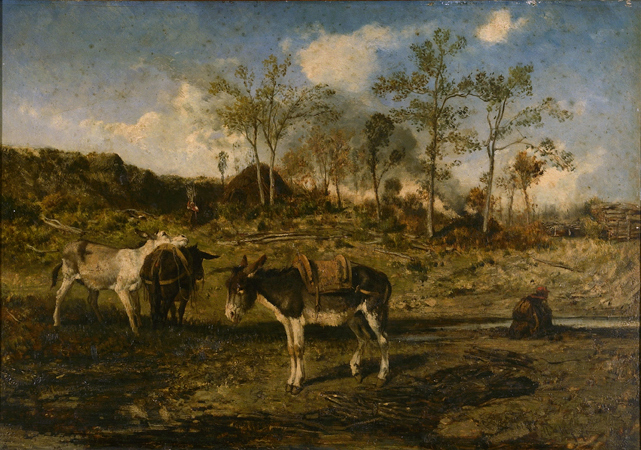
Donkeys

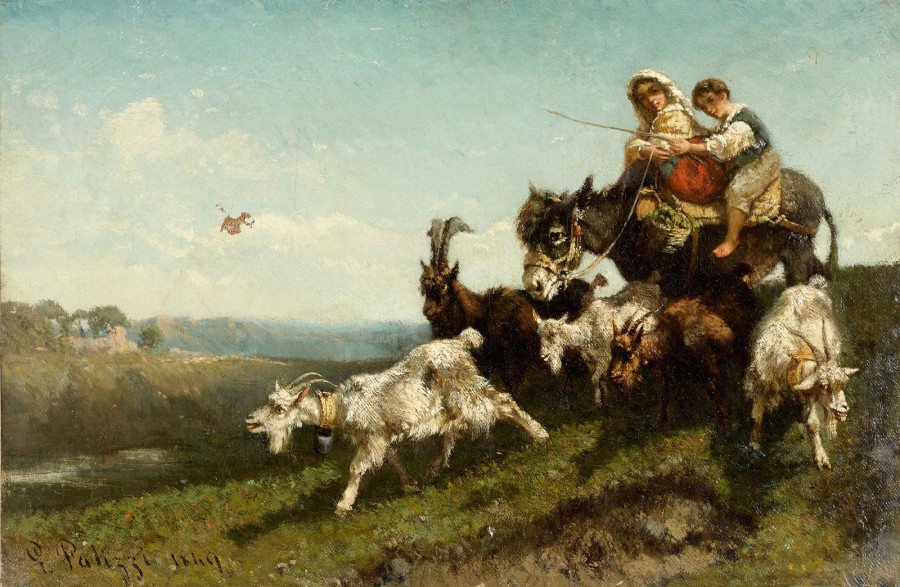
Children on a Donkey, Herding Goats

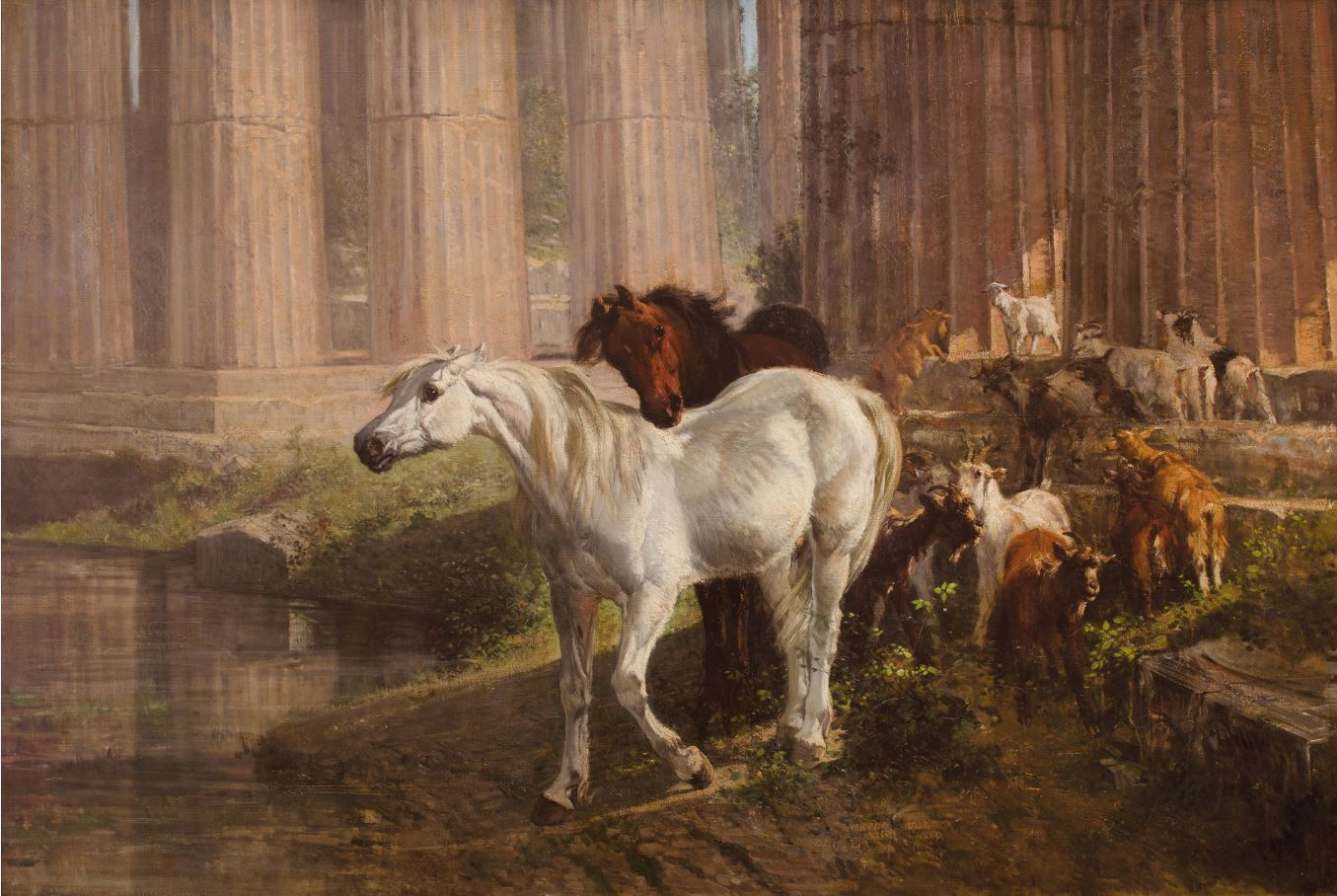
Ruins of the Temple of Paestum

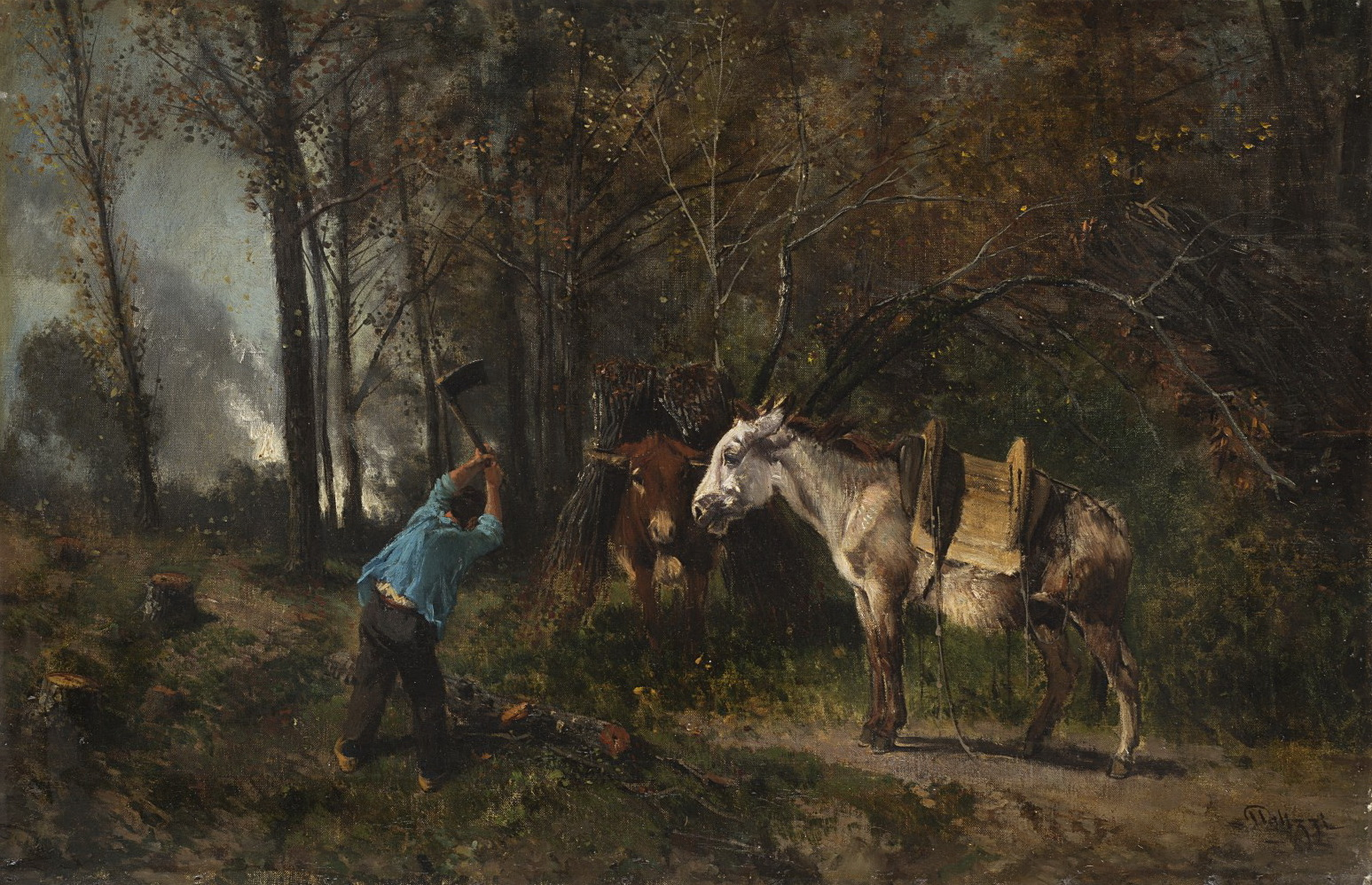
Wood Splitter in the Forest

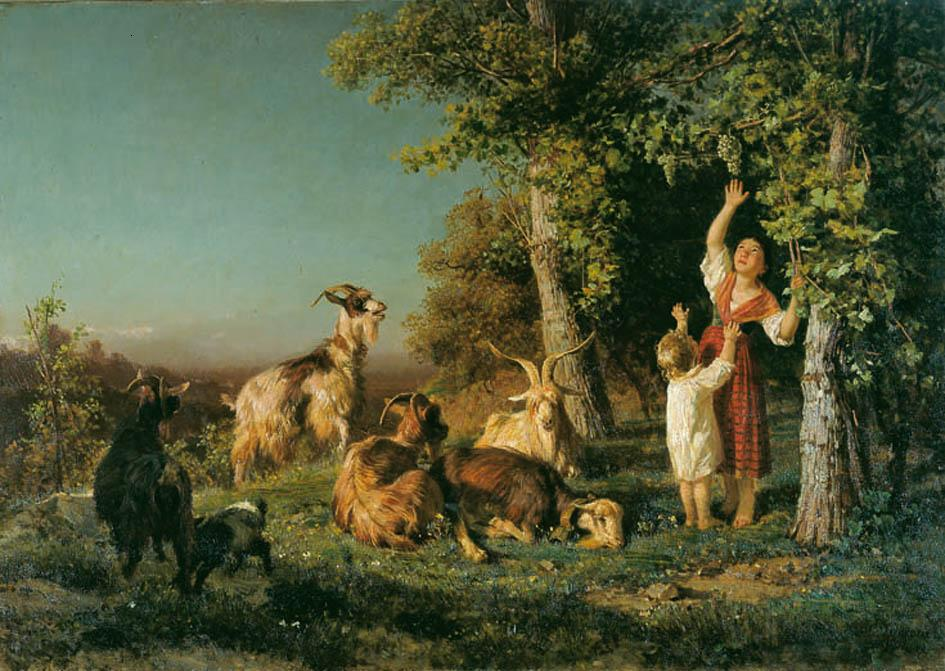
Sunset
