= Nicola Palizzi =

Italian landscape painter (1820–1870)

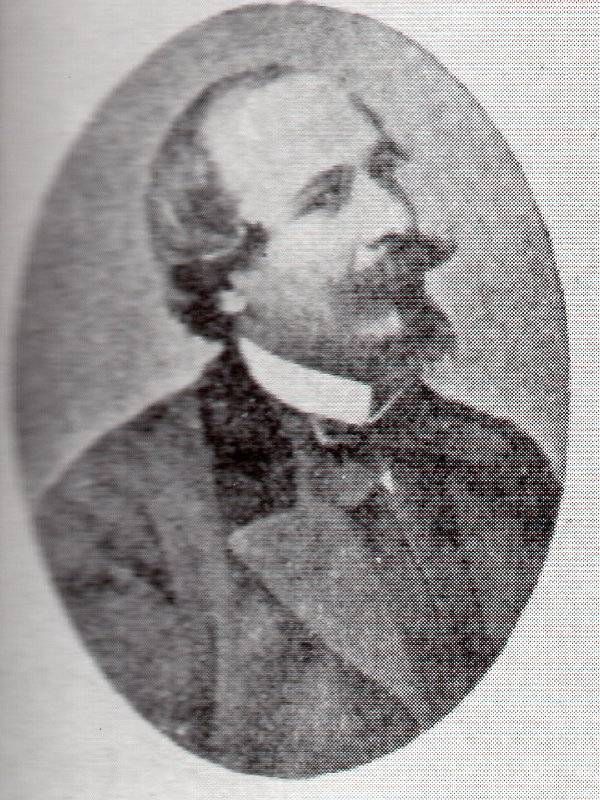
Nicola Palizzi (date unknown)

Nicola Palizzi (20 February 1820, Vasto - 20 September 1870, Naples) was an Italian painter, known primarily for landscapes.

== Biography ==
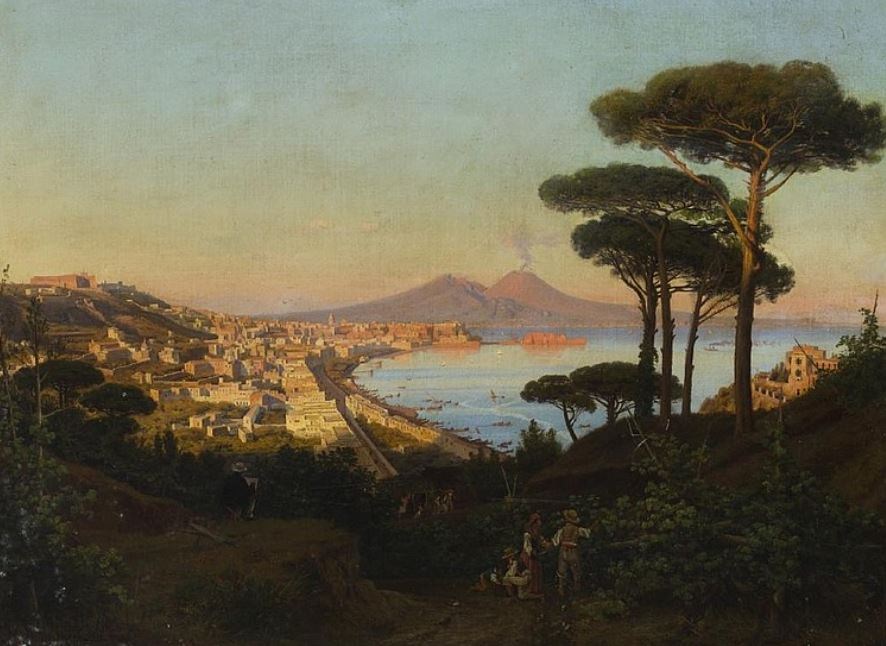
View of the Bay of Naples

He was born into an artistic family. His brothers Giuseppe, Francesco Paolo and Filippo were also painters. He worked as a blacksmith until 1842, when he went to Naples to join them and enrolled at the Academy of Fine Arts, where his primary instructor was Gabriele Smargiassi. He began exhibiting as early as 1843. His first canvases were stylized landscapes that focused on sunsets and the weather.

In 1848, he was awarded a scholarship to study in Rome, but was unable to go, due to the Revolution. By 1851, he had started painting en plein air; adding natural events such as volcanic eruptions to his repertoire. He spent 1854 creating landscapes in Avellino, and was awarded a gold medal at a local exhibition the following year. One of his works was purchased by King Pedro V of Portugal.

In 1856, following the example of his brother Giuseppe, he went to Paris, with short stops in Rome and Florence. There, he familiarized himself with the new styles being employed by the Barbizon School, and the works of Gustave Courbet. In 1859, he was named an honorary professor at the Naples Academy. Upon returning home, he became a member of the artists' group known as the School of Resina and, in 1861, one of the first members of the Society for the Promotion of Fine Arts.

In addition to his paintings, he and his brother Filippo created some illustrations together.

The art gallery at the Civic Museum of Vasto has a room named after him, in which many of his most notable works are exhibited.

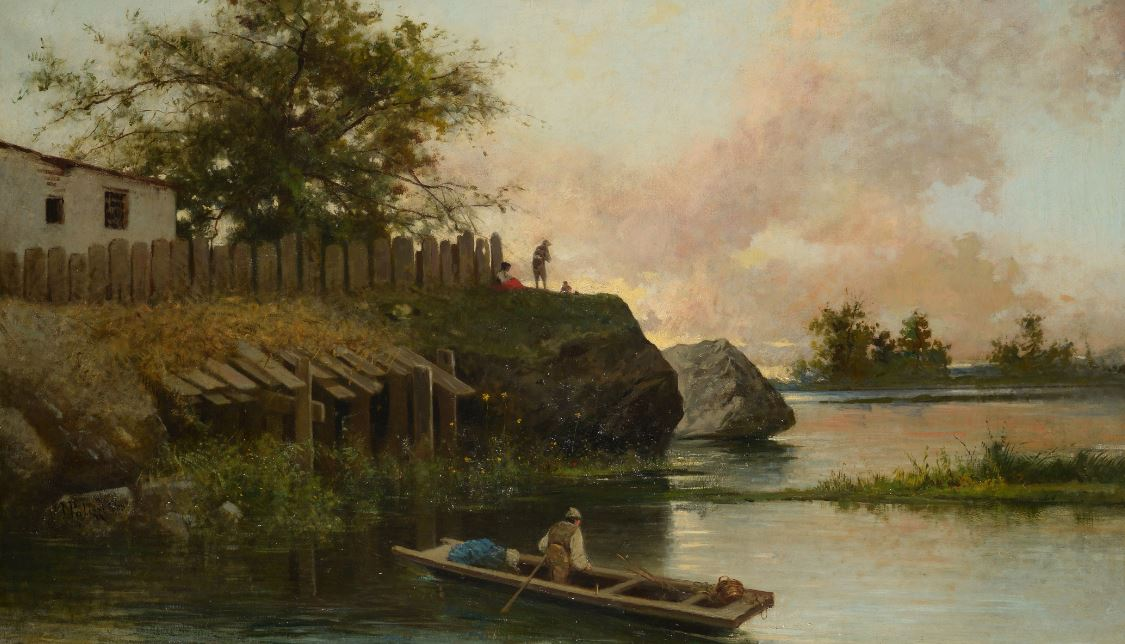
Lake Landscape with Fishermen
