= Domenico Ammirato =

Italian painter

Domenico Ammirato (1833–1883) was an Italian painter, mainly of seascapes in his native Naples.

He trained at the Neapolitan Institute of Fine Arts, following the example of Gabriele Smargiassi. He became professor of painting at the International Institute of Naples. Among his works are:

- Un chiaro dì luna a Posillipo
- La marina piccola di Sorrento
- Sorrento da Capodimonte
- Veduta di Bagnolo
- Veduta di Posillipo
