= Guiscardo Améndola =

Uruguayan painter

Guiscardo Améndola (1906–1972) was a Uruguayan painter who graduated from the Academy of Fine Arts, Naples.
