= Francesco Mancini (1830–1905) =

Italian painter (1830–1905)

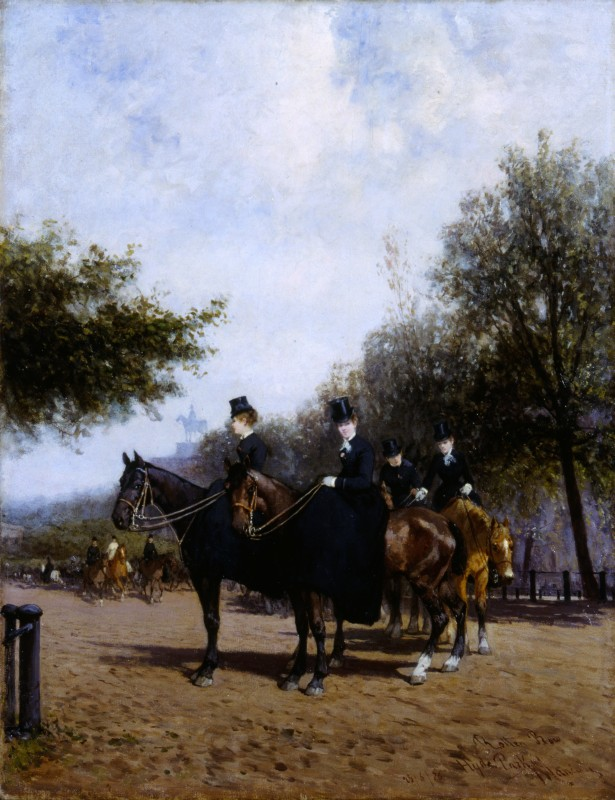
Hyde Park, 1876 (Fondazione Cariplo)

Francesco Mancini (Naples, 1830–1905) was an Italian painter.

== Biography ==
In 1844 Francesco Mancini became a student at the Naples Royal Institute of Fine Arts, where he studied drawing and attended Gabriele Smargiassi’s course on landscape from 1846. At the end of the decade he moved on from his academic training and devoted himself to painting from life, during numerous travels in the regions of southern Italy. He also tried his hand at history painting and presented scenes from the struggle for national liberation in Florence at the Esposizione Nazionale di Firenze of 1861.

A leading figure in Neapolitan cultural life, Mancini became a member of the Società Promotrice di Belle Arti there in 1862 and was a regular participant in its exhibitions. In 1877 he took up a teaching post at the city's Academy and was one of the founders of the Circolo Artistico Napoletano in 1888. His participation in the major national exhibitions in Italian cities included those in Turin (1880 and 1884) and in Milan (1881). His landscapes inspired by the countryside and customs of the Abruzzi, Apulia, and Calabria regions were accompanied in this period by his more fashionable scenes of city life painted during frequent stays in Paris and London, which found great favour with the collectors of the time.

His works found buyers in Europe and America, and he was knighted into the Order of the Crown of Italy. He exhibited in 1877 at Naples: La strada ferrata (property of the Conte de la Feld); four canvases depicting Torchio; and one titled a rupe. In 1880 at Turin, he exhibited: Seascape of Capri; Seascape of Casamicciola; Capo Pescara; Seascape of Naples; Approdo delle barche di Sorrento; Seascape of Pozzuoli; and Veduta dei tre Monti. in 1881 at Milan, he displayed: a landscape, Nel bosco, and Mercato a Popoli negli Abruzzi. At Rome, in 1883: A Zingara (A Gypsy Woman); Dopo il pascolo (also exhibited in 1884 at Turin); Sport; and Dopo la vendemmia. In 1887 at Venezia, in 1887: Amalfi; Pompei; San Marco, and Cava dei Tirreni. Other works are: Veduta di Popoli; Seascape of Ischia; Alpine Locale; Mattino estivo; Ritorno dalla pena; and Tramonto.

== Other projects ==
Media related to Francesco Mancini (1830-1905) at Wikimedia Commons
