= Gustavo Scoppa =

Italian painter

Giuseppe Gustavo Scoppa (7 March 1856, Naples - 1953) was an Italian painter, mainly of land- and particularly sea-scapes.

He studied under his father's instructions, then at the Academy of Fine Arts of Naples. He has exhibited at the Promotrice of Naples. Among his paintings: Il cantiere mercantile di Castellammare; Marina di Puzzano; Seascape of Mollo; Beach at Capri; and Shore of Sorrento.
