= Gabriele Smargiassi =

Italian painter (1798–1882)

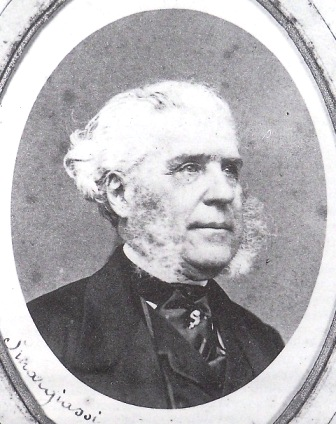
Garbriele Smargiassi (date unknown)

Gabriele Smargiassi (22 July 1798 – 12 May 1882) was an Italian landscape painter and professor at the Academy of Fine Arts in Naples.

== Biography ==
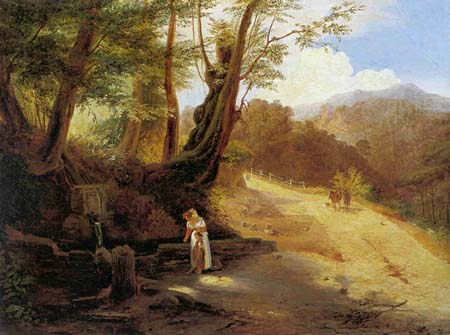
The Fountain of Genzano (1826)

He was born in Vasto to a wealthy family. Initially planning to be a priest like his uncle, he decided to pursue his interest in art and went to Naples, where he enrolled at the Academy of Fine Arts and studied with Giuseppe Cammarano. He later spent a few years with the Dutch-born landscape painter, Anton Sminck van Pitloo, one of the founders of the School of Posillipo.

In 1824, with the support of Hortense de Beauharnais, the Duchess of Saint-Leu, he went to Rome to complete his studies. When she moved to Arenenberg, he followed her, then went on to Paris, where he was introduced to the court of King Louis-Philippe and served as a drawing tutor for his children. During the 1830s, he was a regular exhibitor at the Salon.

He returned to Naples in 1837 to apply for the Chair of Landscape Painting at the Academy, which had been left vacant by Pitloo's death. He was selected for the position, by a narrow margin, over Salvatore Fergola, whose works were more popular. He would hold that chair until his death.

In 1861, he was one of the original signatories to the statutes of the Society for the Promotion of the Fine Arts. That same year, he exhibited at the Italian National Exhibition of Agricultural and Industrial Products and Fine Arts, in Florence, and one of his paintings was purchased by King Victor Emmanuel II.

He had an influence on many younger artists, including Nicola Palizzi, Gennaro Della Monica, and Cesare Uva. His notable students included Francesco Mancini, Domenico Ammirato, Alfonso Simonetti, and Raimondo Scoppa. His works may be seen in the Galleria d'Arte Moderna at the Palazzo Pitti; the Museo di Capodimonte, and the National Museum of San Martino, among many others.

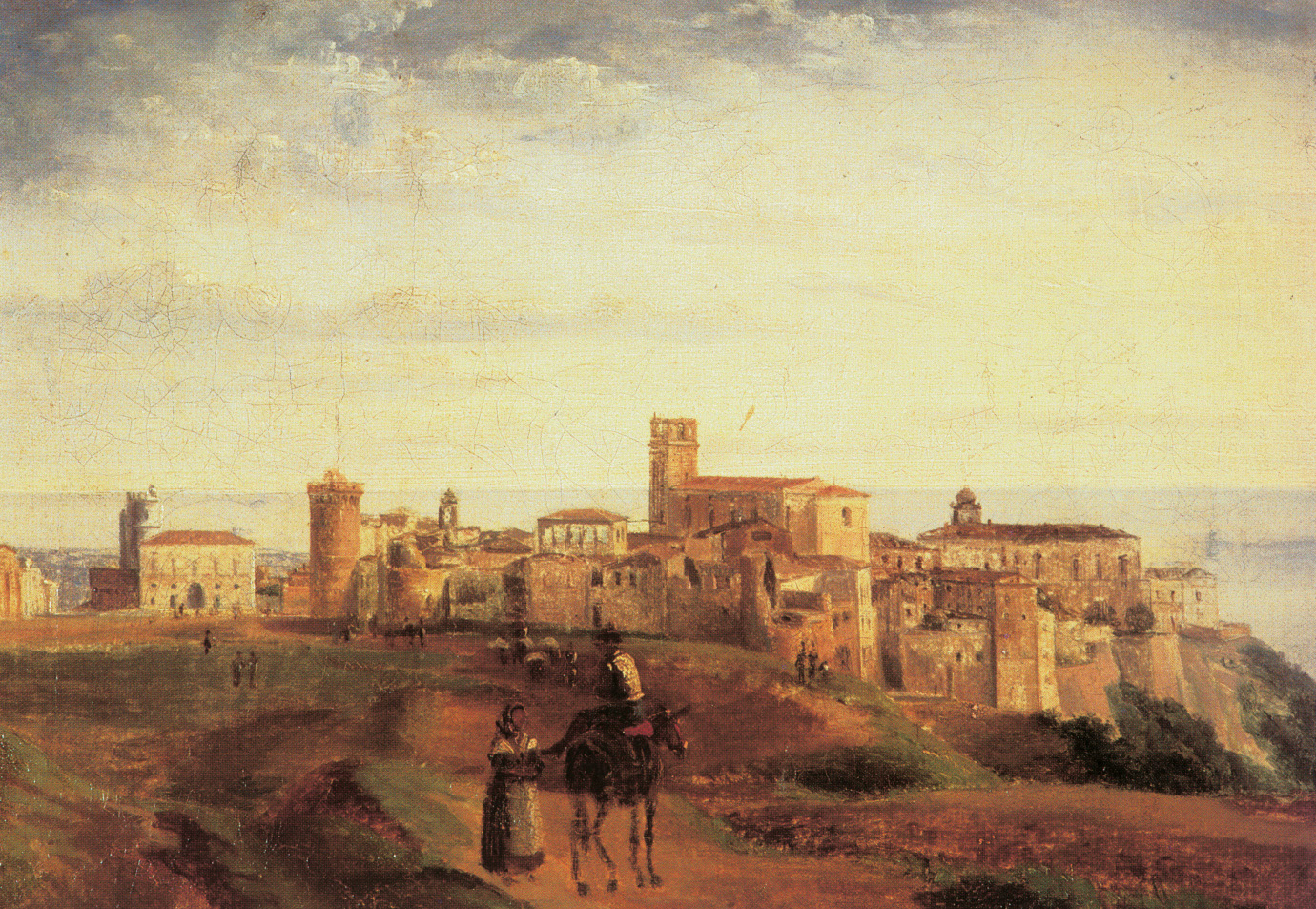
View of Vasto (1831)
