= Filippo Palizzi =

Italian painter (1818–1899)

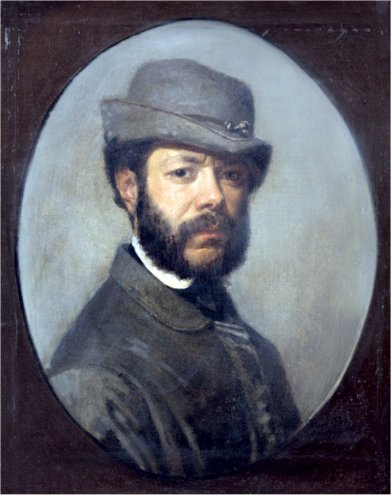
Self-portrait (c. 1860)

Filippo Palizzi (16 June 1818 – 11 September 1899) was an Italian painter, known for his rural genre scenes with animals, mostly goats. His brothers, Francesco Paolo, Giuseppe and Nicola, also became painters.

== Biography ==
He was born in Vasto. He was the fifth of thirteen children born to Antonio Palizzi, a lawyer, and his wife Doralice née Del Greco, an amateur musician. In 1836, he joined his brother Giuseppe in Naples and, the following year, was admitted to the Royal Institute of Fine Arts. He began his studies with the professor of landscape painting, Gabriele Smargiassi, but they soon had a falling out, with major disagreements about not only the nature of art, but politics as well.

As a result, he withdrew from the Academy to attend the private school of the painter Giuseppe Bonolis.

In 1839, he had his first showing, at the Academy, and one of his works was purchased by the Duchess of Berry. His brother Giuseppe, who moved to Paris in 1844, introduced him to the paintings of the Barbizon School. In the early 1850s, his talents were recognized by the Academy, and he was awarded a silver medal, with a stipend to study in Rome.

In 1855, Palizzi joined Giuseppe in Paris, where he exhibited at the Exposition Universelle. He was there periodically until 1867, when he once again exhibited at the Exposition Universelle, winning a gold medal.

Filippo Palizzi became especially known for his naturalist animal painting, with rural scenes of goats, donkeys, calves and other domestic animals observed outside the conventions of academic genre painting.

Within this Neapolitan artistic milieu, Palizzi maintained a close relationship with Francesco Di Bartolo, the Sicilian engraver and painter. Di Bartolo gave Palizzi advice and instruction in etching, and later interpreted Palizzi’s animal subjects in his own prints, reworking his repertory of donkeys, goats, calves and stable scenes and contributing to their circulation in print.

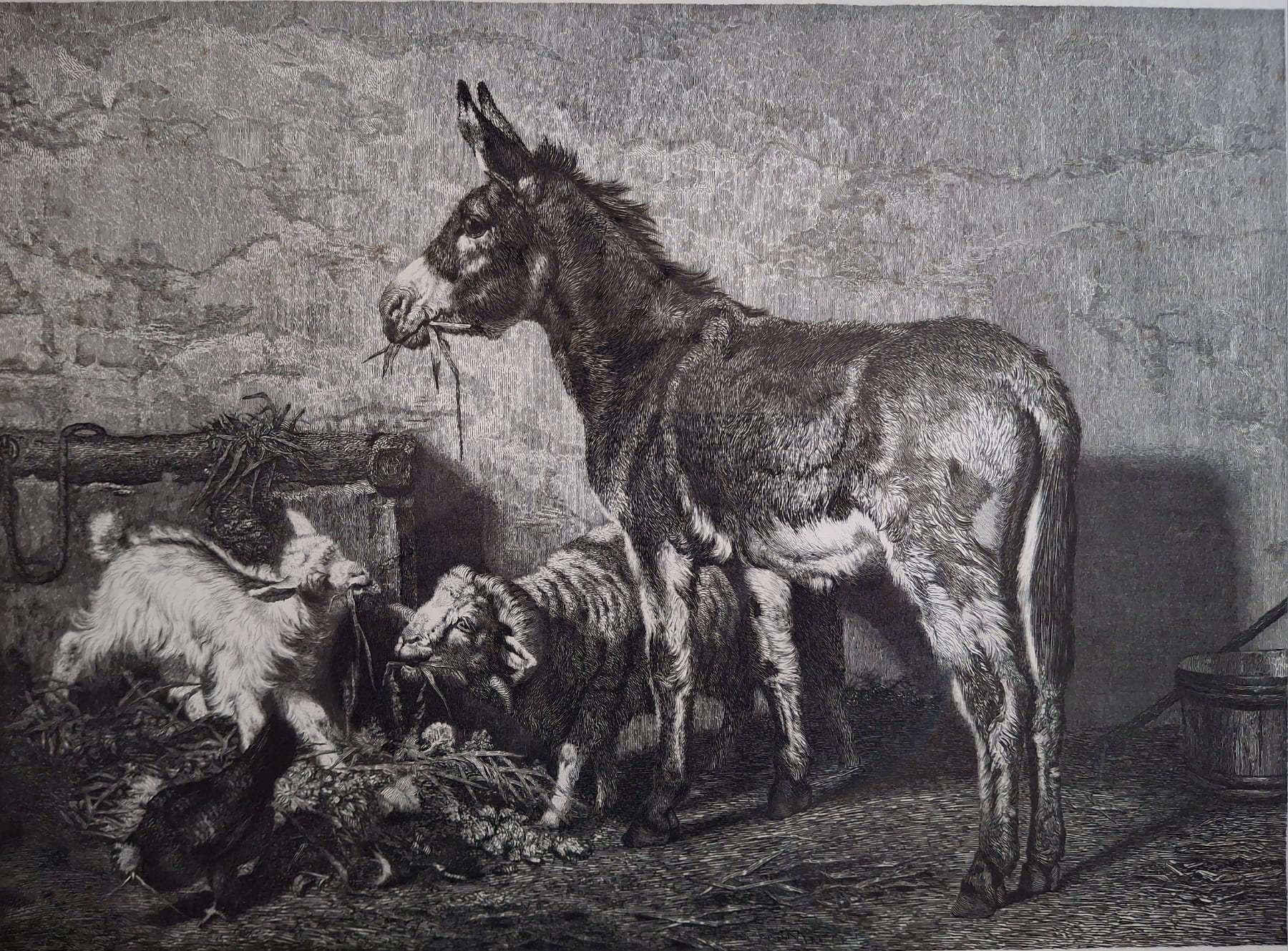
Animal subjects after Filippo Palizzi, etching by Francesco Di Bartolo, Naples, c. 1860.

In 1861, Palizzi was also the first President of the Società Promotrice di Belle Arti in Naples, which promoted contemporary art and public exhibitions beyond the traditional academic framework.

His brother Nicola died in 1870, followed by Francesco Paolo in 1871. For a time, this made him solitary and grumpy, but he was able to travel to Vienna in 1873, where he was one of the judges at the World's Fair. Five years later, Francesco De Sanctis, the Minister of Public Education, convinced him to become President of the Academy and bring its teaching methods up to date. The administration there was in disarray, but he managed to restore order, introduce new subjects, and hire new teachers. Exhausted by his efforts, he submitted his resignation in 1880. It was accepted the following year.

Later in 1881, upon the recommendation of Domenico Morelli, he was named the first Director of the new Industrial Arts Museum, where he established a ceramics workshop. He held that position until 1891, when the new Minister of Education, Pasquale Villari, talked him into reassuming the office of Academy President for five years. In 1896, his contract was renewed for an additional five years, but he died in the latter part of 1899, in Naples.

Shortly before his death, he donated 120 of his works, as well as some by Nicola and Francesco Paolo, to the gallery at the Academy. His paintings may also be seen at the Galleria Nazionale d'Arte Moderna, and the Museo di Capodimonte, among others.

== Selected paintings ==
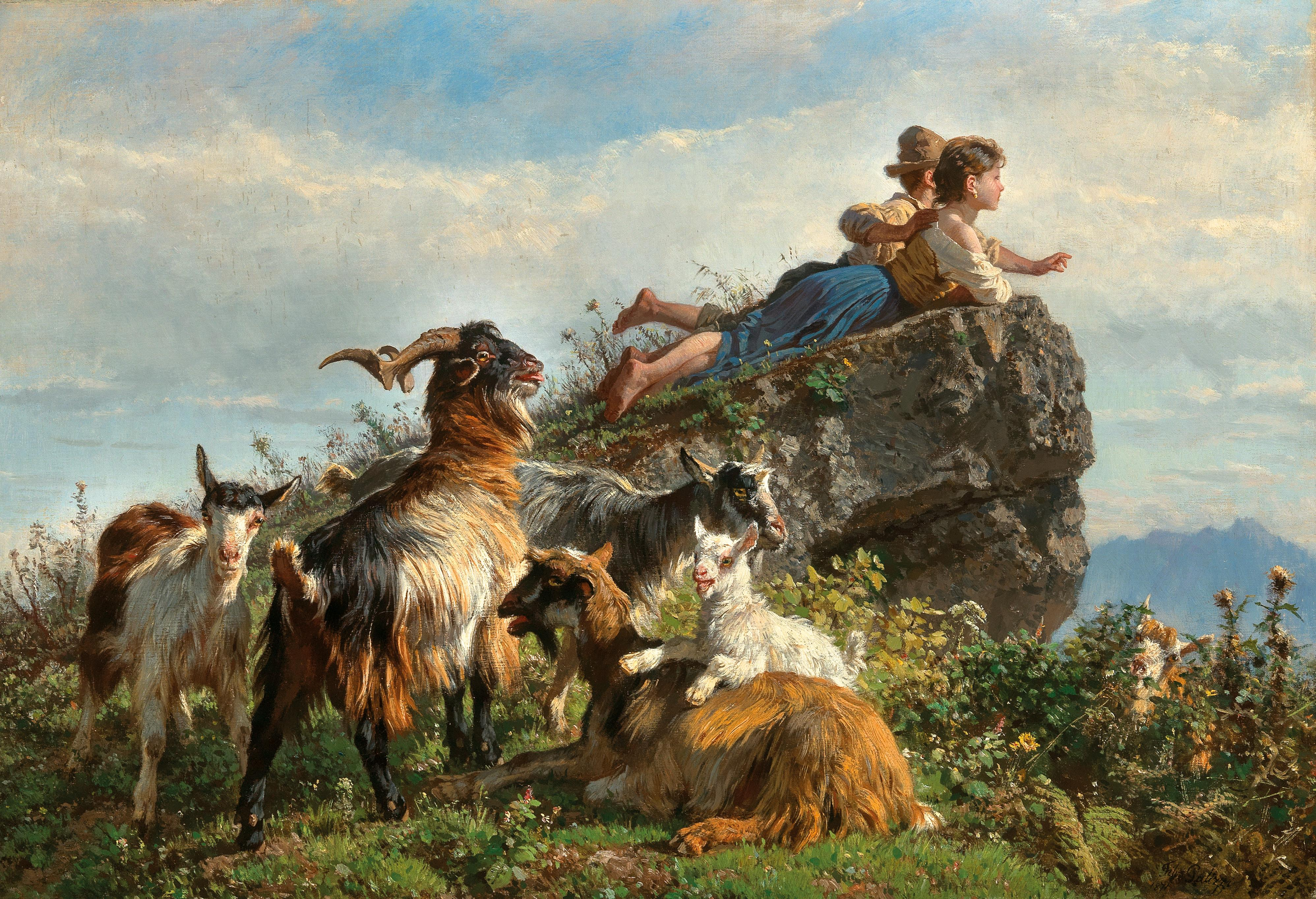
The Little Goatherders (1871)

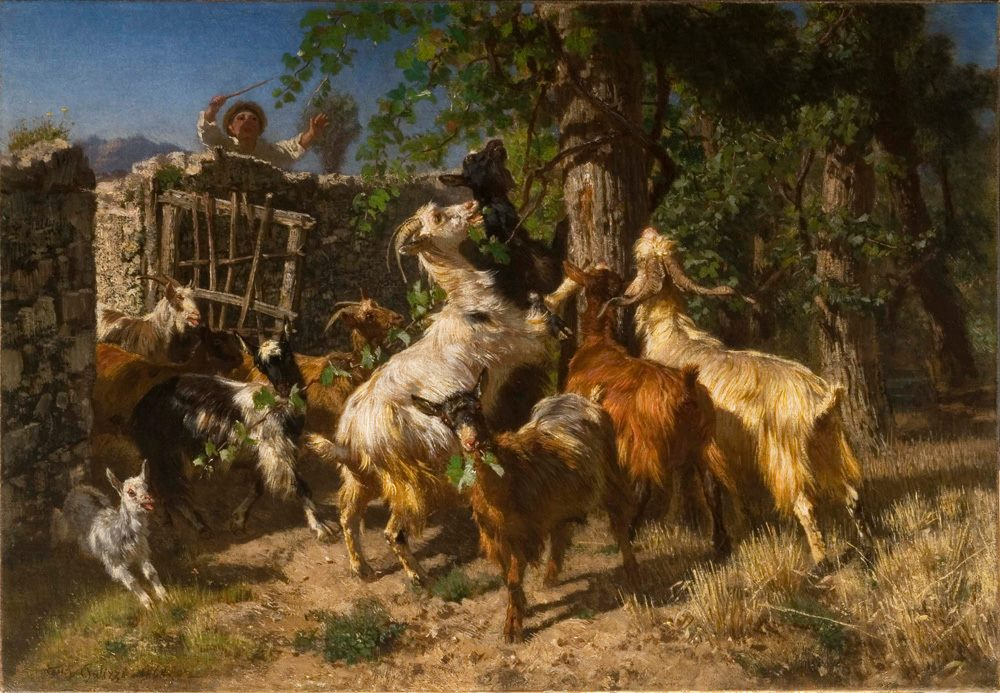
Goats in the Wild

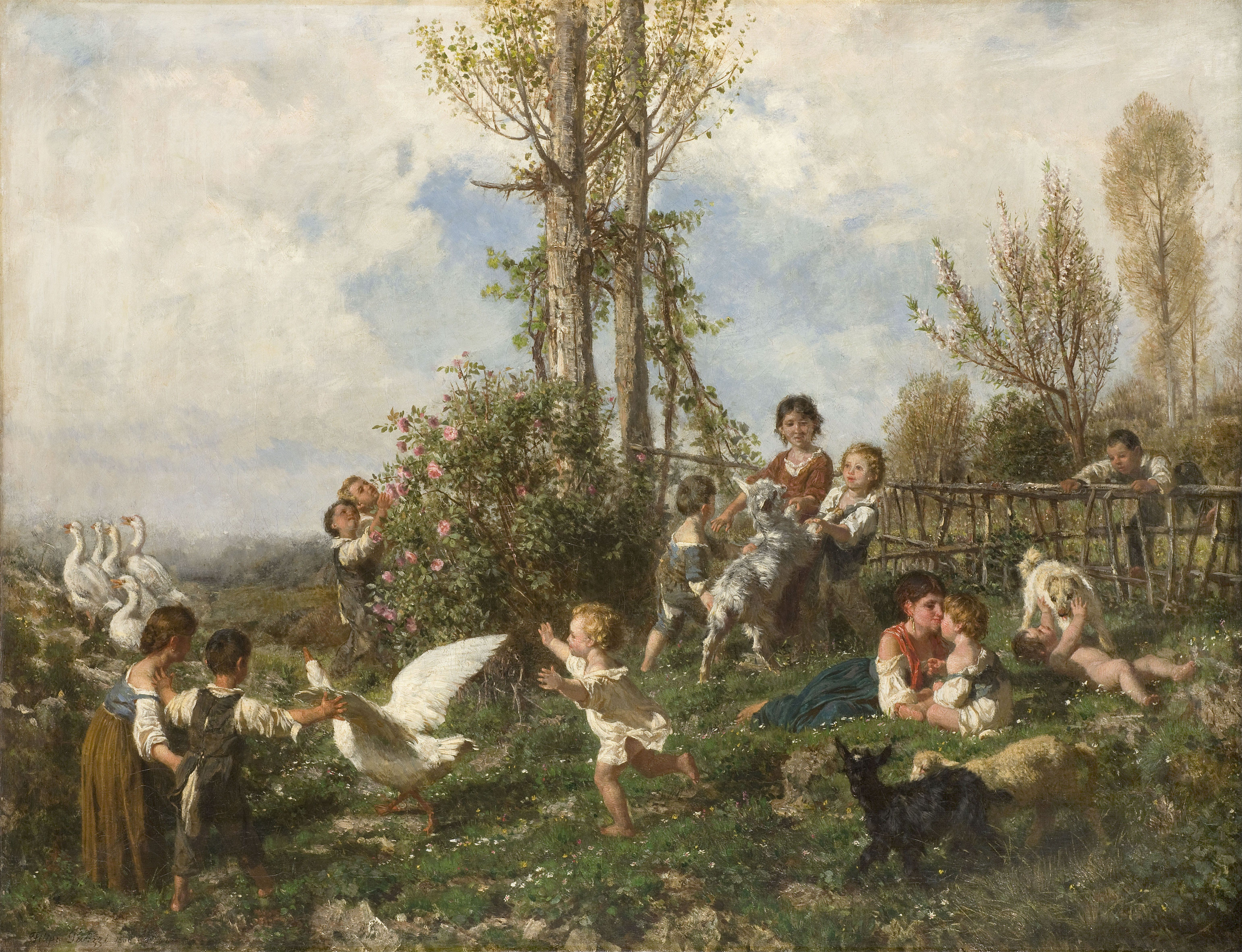
Spring (1868)

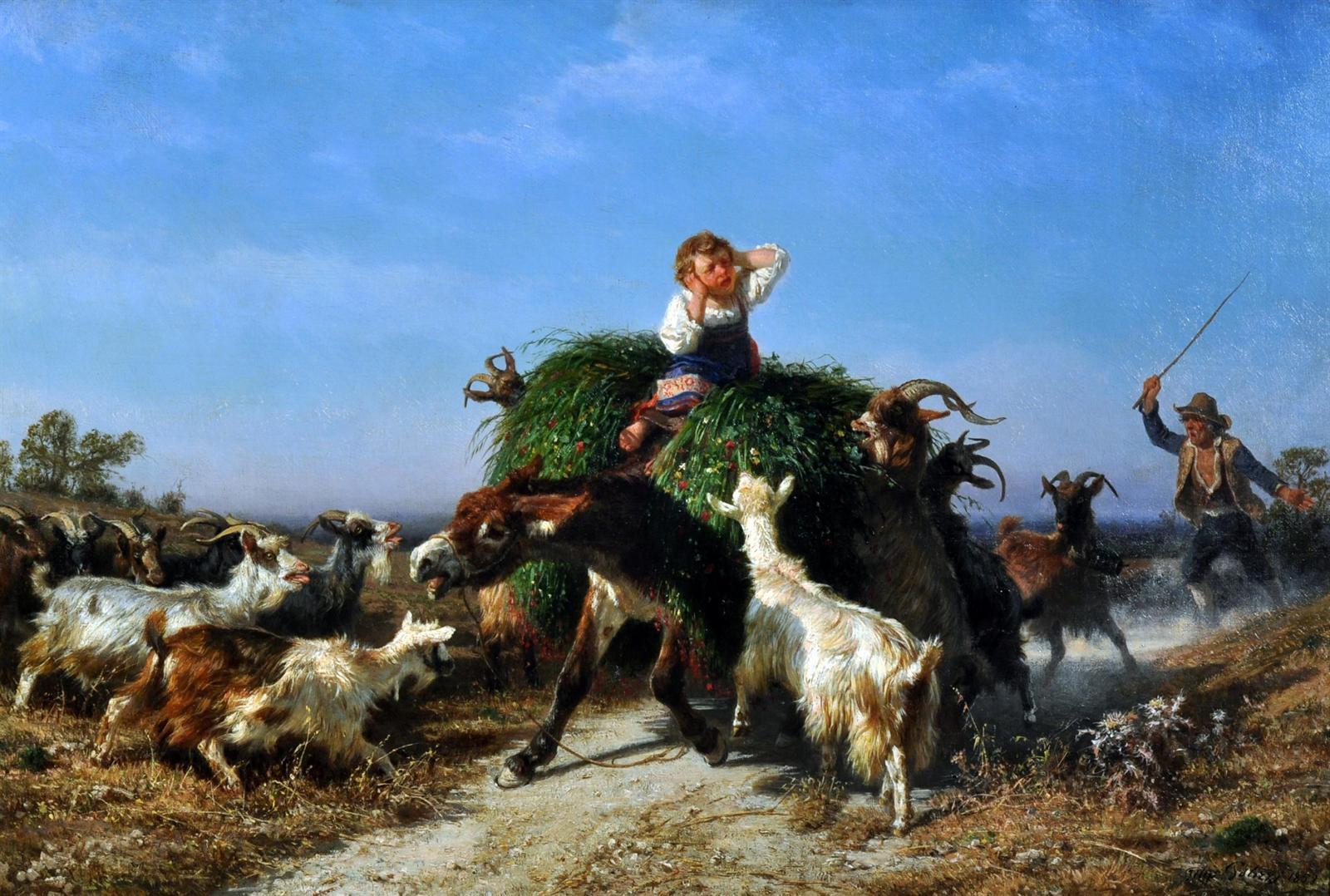
Goats Conquer the Hay Cart (1858)

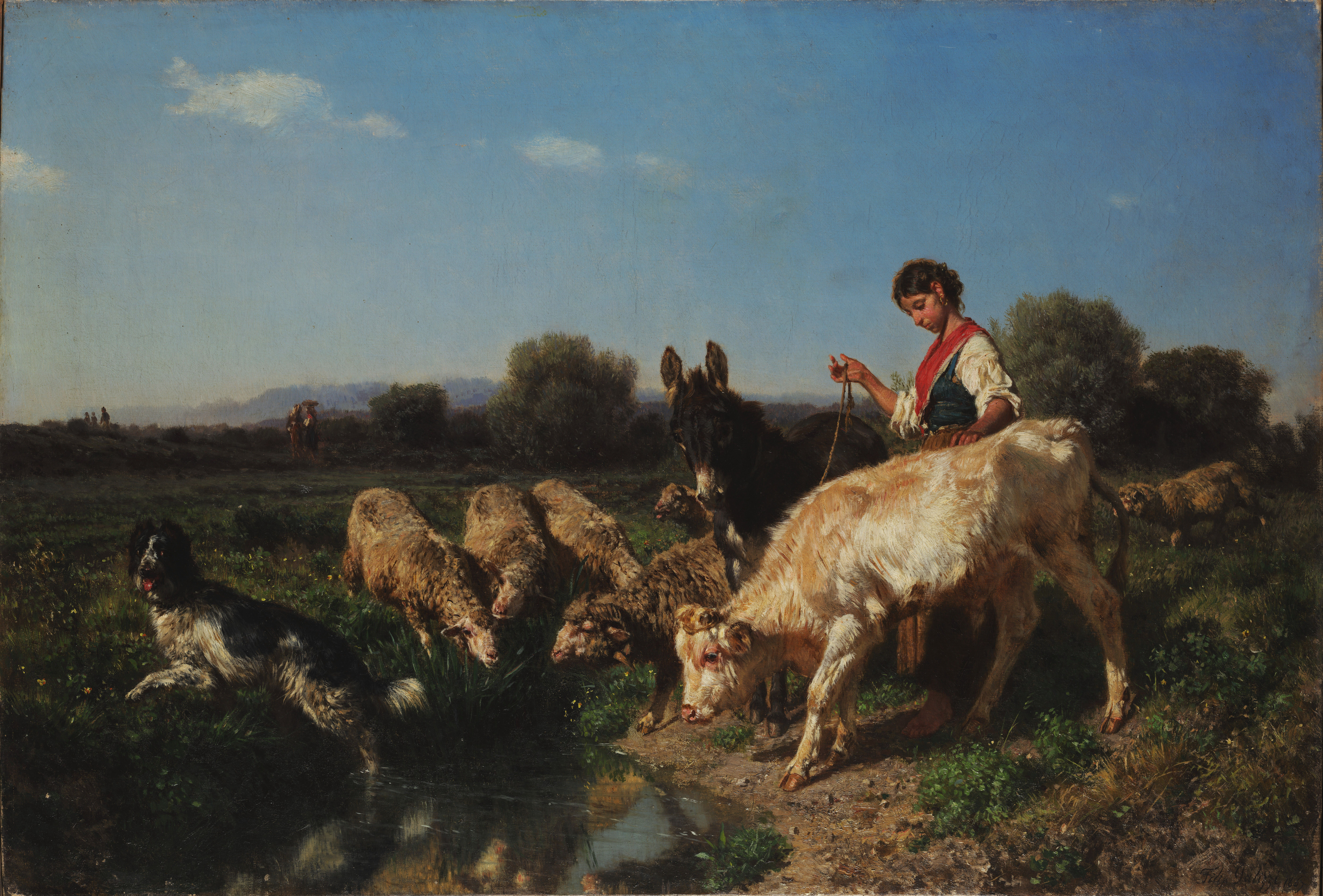
At the Watering Hole (1867)
