= Giovanni Di Giorgio =

Italian painter

Giovanni Di Giorgio (29 April 1914 - 8 August 1992) was an Italian painter, mainly of genre subjects in oil and acquaforte. After studying at the Liceo artistico, he enrolled at the Institute of Fine Arts of Naples, under Pietro Barillà, Alberto Chiancone, and Eugenio Viti. Di Giorgio had won various awards for fresco and oil painting. He obtained a subsidy in 1939 to travel to Monza and study under Pio Semeghini and Raffaele De Grada. In 1937, he had exhibited a number of xerographs at the Circolo artistico Italo-Romano. Returning to Aversa in 1942, he taught design at the local School, and after 1970, was director of the Liceo Artistico Statale. Among his works are Dolenti note and Idillio campestre. He also illustrated books.
