= Accademia di Belle Arti di Napoli =

Fine arts school of Naples, Italy

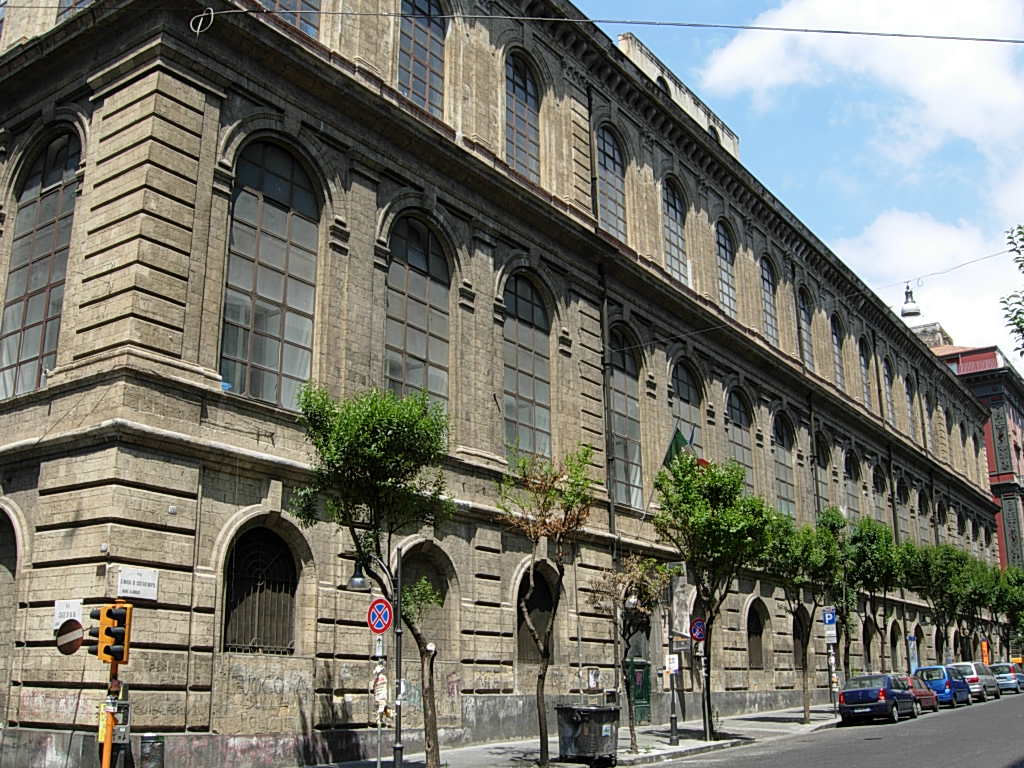
- Facade of the main academy building on Via Santa Maria di Costantinopoli
- Former names: Reale Istituto di Belle Arti; Reale Accademia di Belle Arti
- Type: Academy of fine arts
- Established: 1752; 274 years ago
- Director: Giuseppe Gaeta
- Students: 3.995
- Location: Naples, Italy; 40.851572°N 14.251200°E
- Website: www.accademiadinapoli.it

The Accademia di Belle Arti di Napoli (Naples Academy of Fine Arts) is a university-level art school in Naples. In the past it has been known as the Reale Istituto di Belle Arti and the Reale Accademia di Belle Arti. Founded by King Charles VII of Naples in 1752, it is one of the oldest art schools in Italy, and offers various levels of study up to and including the equivalent of an Italian laurea (the country's main post-secondary academic degree). It is located one block south of the church of Santa Maria di Costantinopoli, on the via of the latter church's name.

== History ==
The academy was founded in 1752 by Charles VII of Naples and had its origins in two schools, the Accademia del Disegno (Academy of Drawing) and the Accademia del Nudo (Academy of the Nude). It was originally housed in buildings attached to the church of San Carlo alle Mortelle. For many years its administration remained under the control of the Reale Laboratorio delle Pietre Dure (Royal Gemstone Laboratory) and the Reale Fabbrica degli Arazzi (Royal Tapestry Factory). Under Joseph Napoleon, King of Naples from 1806 to June 1808, it was given the name Reale Accademia di Belle Arti. Reforms in 1822 resulted in a name change to the Reale Istituto di Belle Arti, a name it would retain until 1923, when the Gentile reform of the Italian educational system, restored it to Reale Accademia di Belle Arti.

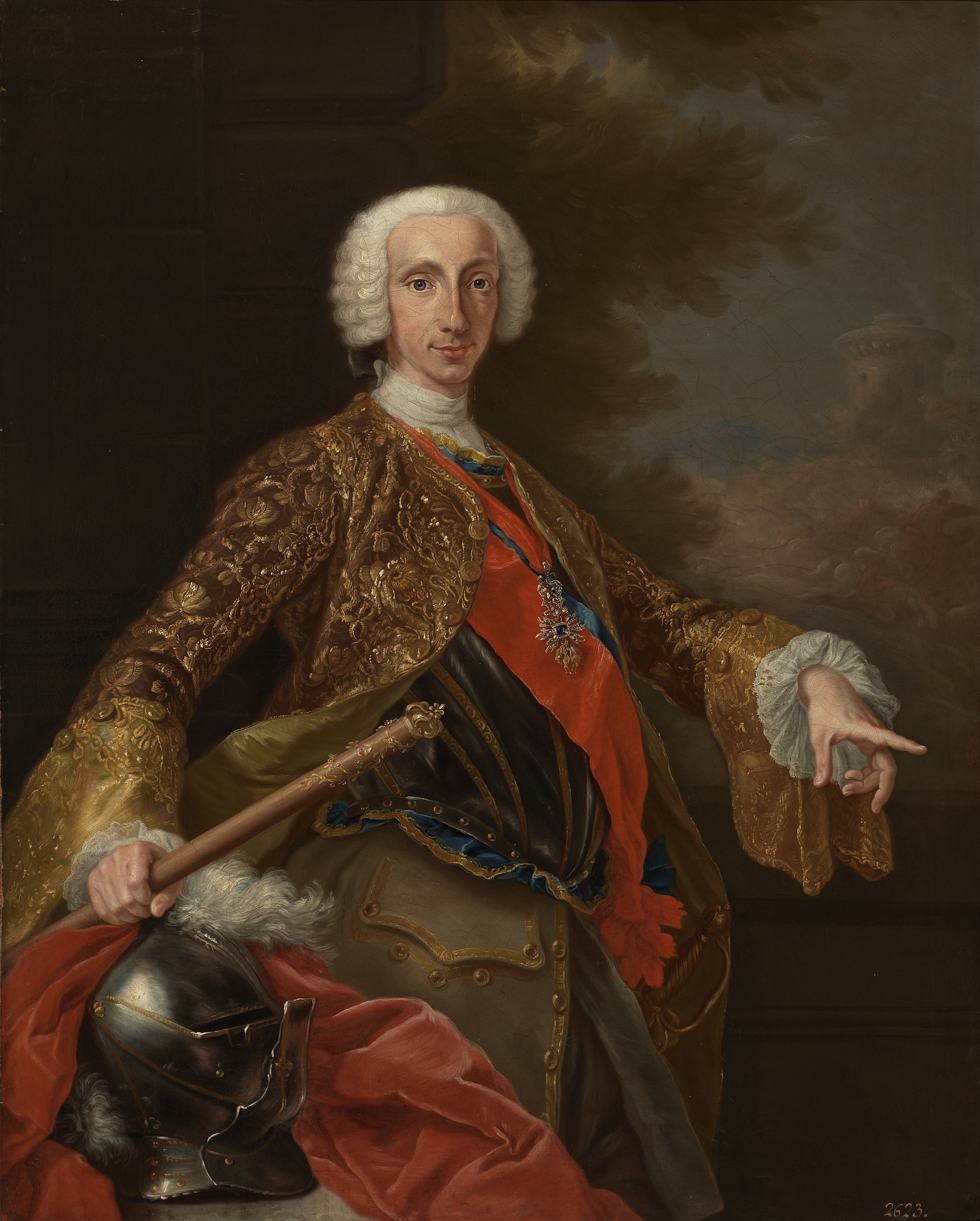
Charles VII of Naples, the academy's founder

With the unification of Italy in 1861, the school was reconstituted with its own administration led by its principal professors and subject to the Ministry of Public Education. In the mid-1860s, after a period in the Palazzo degli Studi (formerly the seat of the University of Naples and now the Naples National Archaeological Museum), the academy moved to its present site, a large building on the Via Santa Maria di Costantinopoli designed in the neo-Renaissance style by Enrico Alvino. It had been converted from an 18th-century convent attached to the church of San Giovanni Battista delle Monache and was part of a large-scale urban development project led by Alvino and Francesco Saponieri (later Director of the Accademia di Belle Arti). The academy's school of architecture, highly active in the 19th century, was transferred to the University of Naples in 1935. The academy closed during World War II, and from 1943 until the end of the war, its building was occupied by Allied troops. After the abolition of the monarchy in Italy in 1946, the Reale (Royal) was dropped from its name.

In 1999 following national educational reforms, the academy (along with most other fine art academies and music conservatories in Italy), was recognized as part of the university sector with their highest level diplomas equivalent to the Italian laurea. The academy elected its first woman Director, the art historian Giovanna Cassese, in 2007. She was succeeded in that post by another art historian, Aurora Spinosa, who was appointed in October 2013. Spinosa is the daughter of the painter Domenico Spinosa (1916-2007) and also serves as curator of the academy's museum, the Galleria dell'Accademia di Belle Arti.

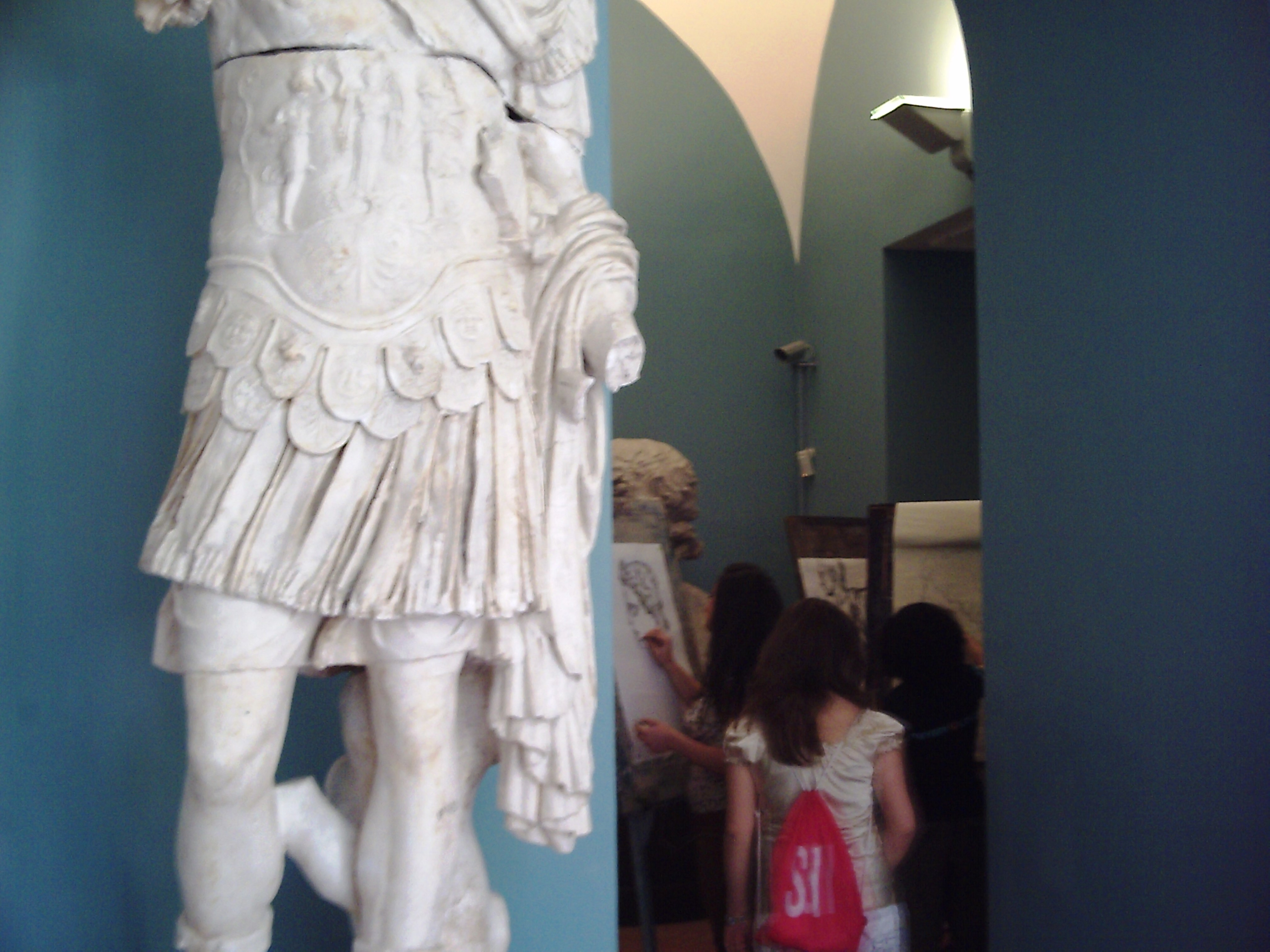
Students drawing in the academy's collection of plaster casts

== Alumni ==
- Salvatore Albano
- Francesco Saverio Altamura
- Giovanni Battista Amendola
- Giovanni Di Giorgio
- Guiscardo Améndola
- Valerico Laccetti

Jorit, an alumnus, was nominated by Michelina Manzillo and the University Rector Renato Lori to the Wolf Prize 2023 for the arts category.

== Academic organization ==
The academy is organized into three departments:

- Arti visive (visual arts) runs the programs in painting, sculpture, decorative arts, fine art graphics, and illustration.
- Progettazione artistica per l'impresa (commercial arts) runs the programs in theatre and film scenography, graphic design for public media, photography, fashion design, costume design, and textile design. The department also incorporates the Scuola di Restauro, founded in 2000, which trains students in art conservation and restoration.
- Didattica dell'arte (art pedagogy) trains students with previous diplomas in one or more of the fine arts for careers as art teachers.

The Scuola Libera del Nudo ("free school of the nude") of the academy is open also to those who are not enrolled as full-time students and specialises in teaching techniques for drawing and painting nudes.

== Museum ==
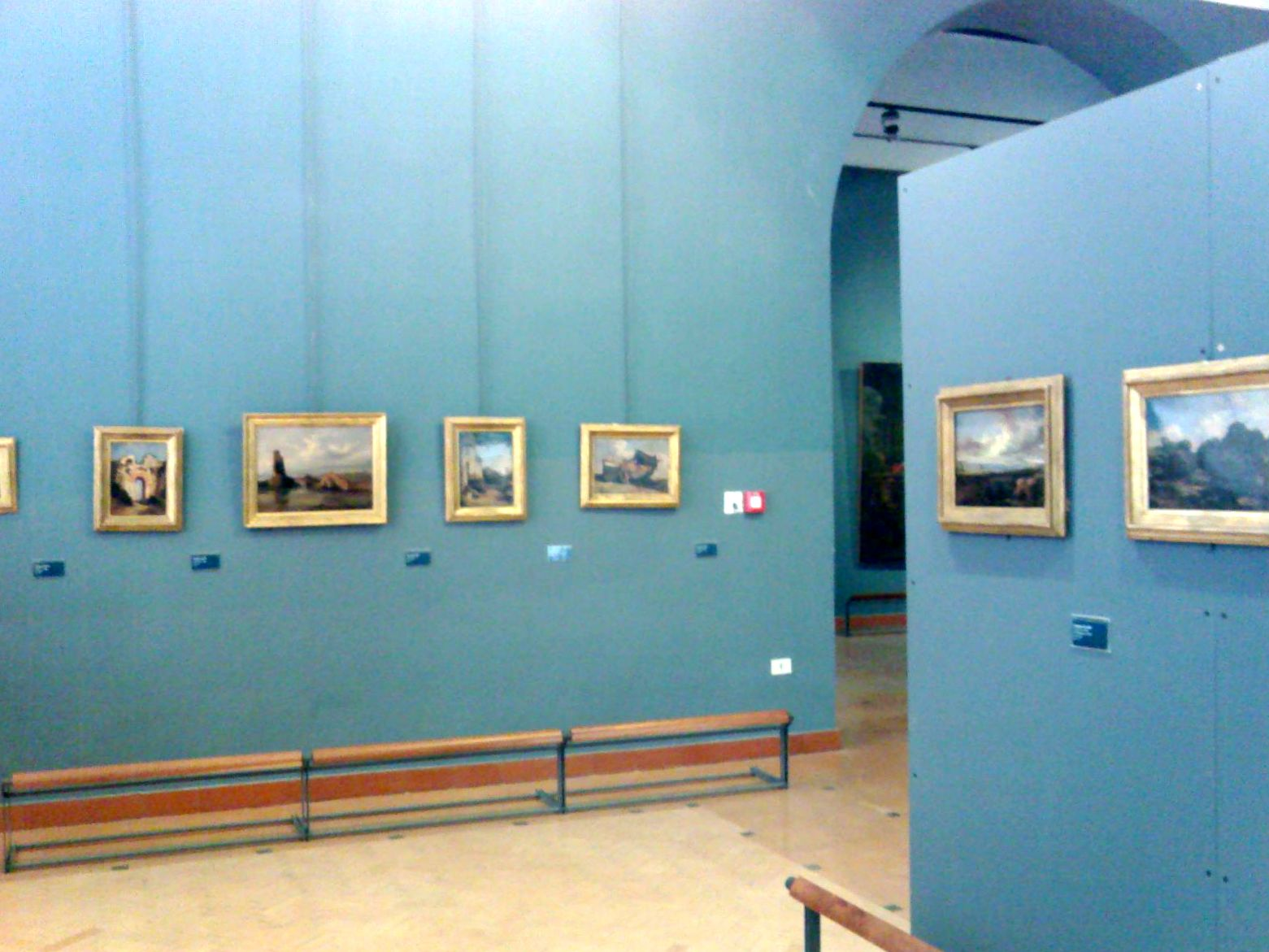
One of the rooms devoted to 19th-century paintings in the Galleria dell'Accademia di Belle Arti

The academy's museum, the Galleria dell'Accademia di Belle Arti, is housed in the main building of the academy and is open to the public. It began as a collection of paintings, drawings, and sculptures acquired for students to observe and study before beginning work on live models. In 1891 Filippo Palizzi, who was the president of the academy at the time, proposed housing the collection in a permanent public gallery and building it up to include contemporary art. Palizzi himself donated a large number of his own works and those by his brothers, Giuseppe, Nicolas, and Francesco, as well as works by French artists which they had collected. The gallery was not completed until 1916. However, it was forced to close shortly thereafter due to problems of humidity and inadequate skylights. It re-opened in 1929, but was again closed during World War II when the collections were dispersed and put in storage. It did not re-open until 1959.

Further structural problems with the gallery forced its closure in the 1970s for urgent repair work. The collections were again dispersed for safe-keeping, and some of the works stored in the academy were lost in a serious theft in 1984. The gallery finally re-opened in 2005. The works on display range from the 17th to the mid-20th century. The oldest painting is by Jusepe de Ribera (1591 – 1652), but the museum is particularly noted for its collection of 19th-century works including those from the School of Posillipo, many of whose artists had been students and professors at the academy. In 2007, the museum's Gipsoteca, a collection of plaster casts of important sculptures, like The Thoughtful girl ("Bimba pensosa") by Giovanni De Martino and reliefs, was opened to the public. It contains over 70 pieces displayed thematically in four rooms.

== See also ==
- List of academies of fine art in Italy
