= Francesco Di Bartolo =

Italian engraver and painter (1826–1913)

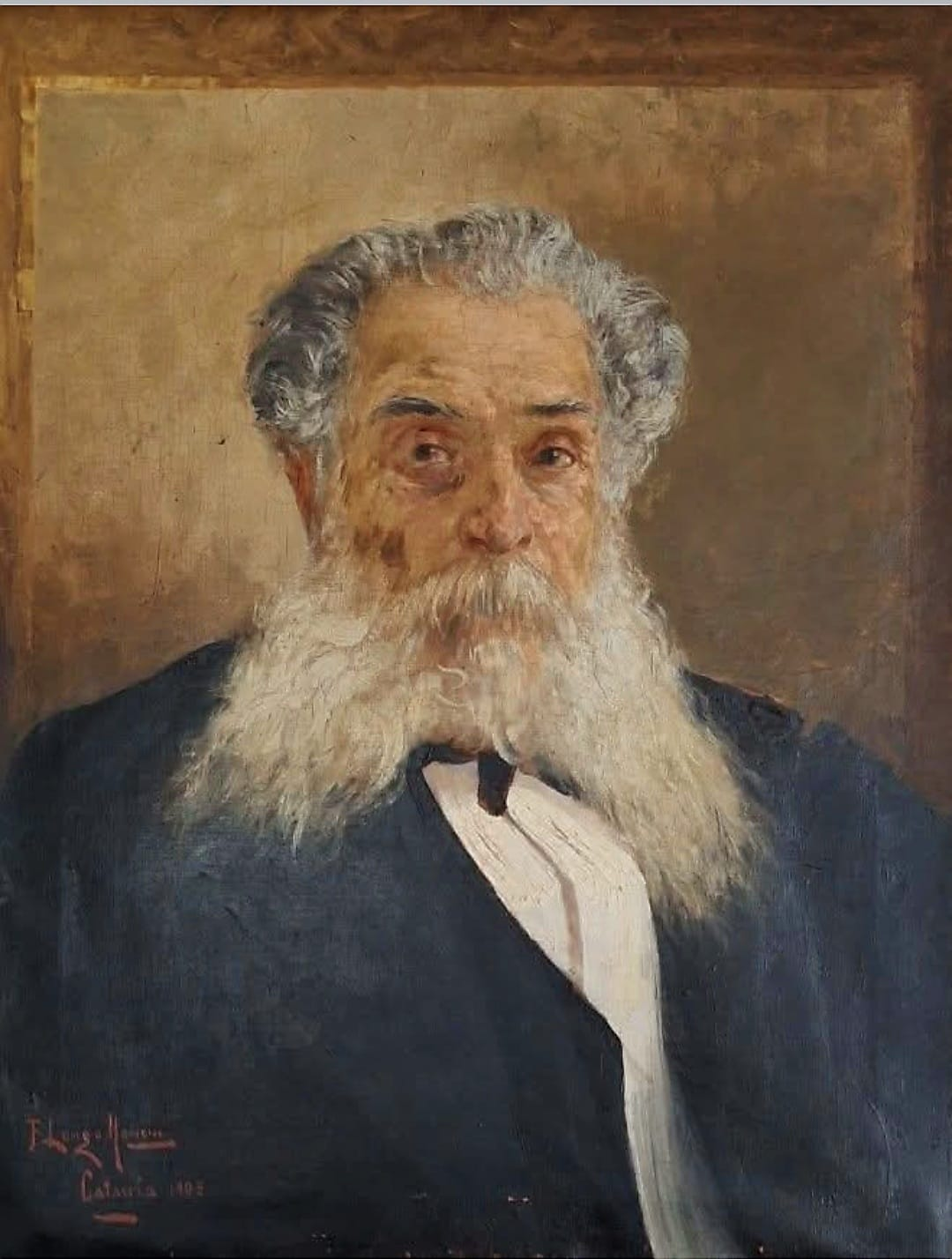
- Francesco Di Bartolo
- Born: January 17, 1826; Catania, Kingdom of the Two Sicilies
- Died: February 2, 1913 (aged 87); Catania
- Education: Academy of Fine Arts of Naples
- Known for: Intaglio printmaking, etching, portrait engraving
- Parents: Antonino Di Bartolo (father); Giuseppina Consoli (mother)

Francesco Di Bartolo (17 January 1826 – 2 February 1913) was an Italian engraver and painter, active in Naples, Rome and Catania, mainly in the field of intaglio printmaking.

== Biography ==
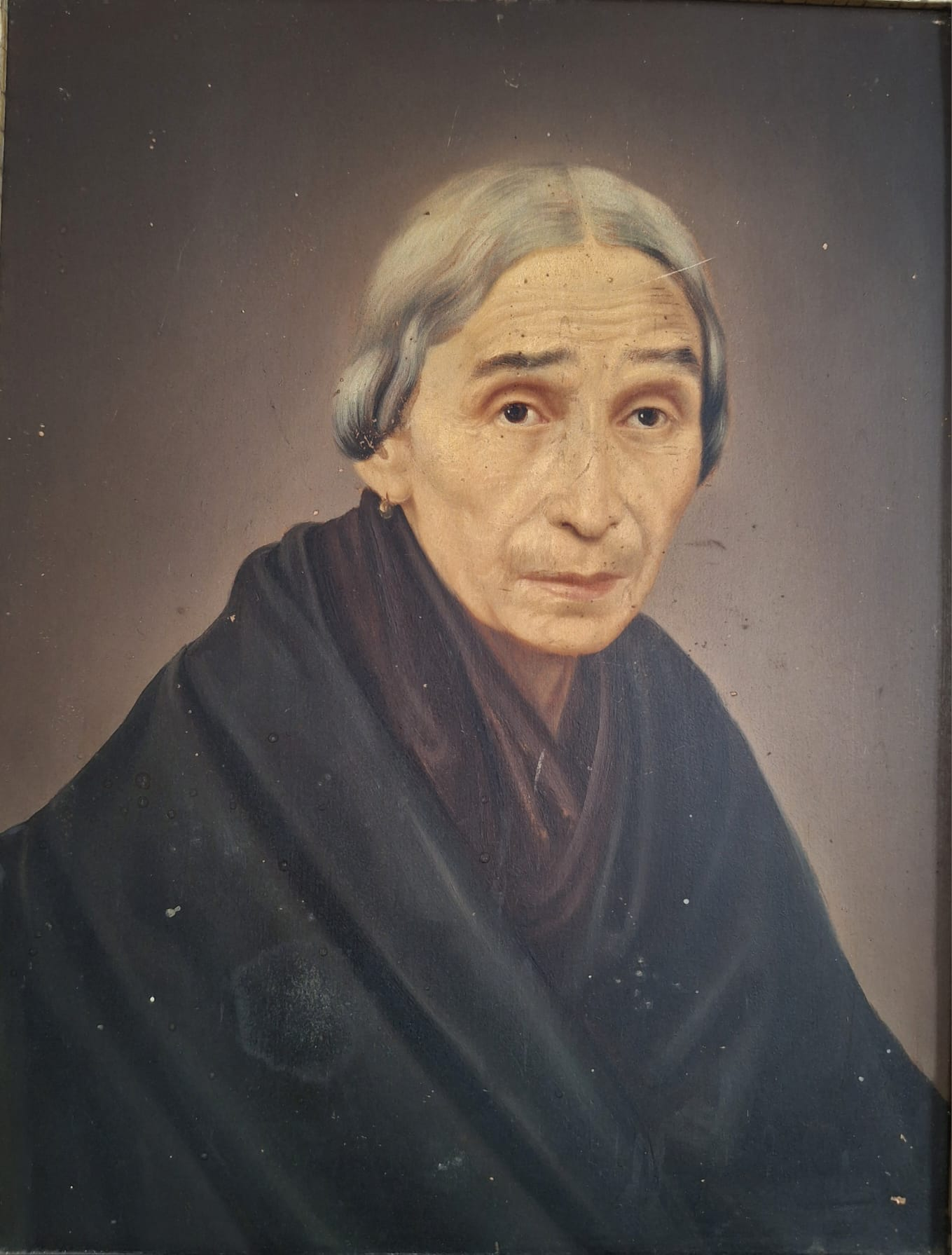
Giuseppe Gandolfo, Portrait of Giuseppina Consoli, mother of Francesco Di Bartolo, c. 1850

Born in Catania to the jurist Antonino Di Bartolo and Giuseppina Consoli (1794–1877), he received his early education in his native city. He was a nephew of Giacomo Di Bartolo, known as Bartulu, a patriot, soldier, orator and tribune of Catania who played a prominent role in the city's public life during the Risorgimento. Calcedonio Reina described Francesco as the “nephew of the celebrated leader of the people”. Di Bartolo produced an etched portrait of his uncle entitled Giacomo Di Bartolo, cittadino catanese (“Giacomo Di Bartolo, Citizen of Catania”).

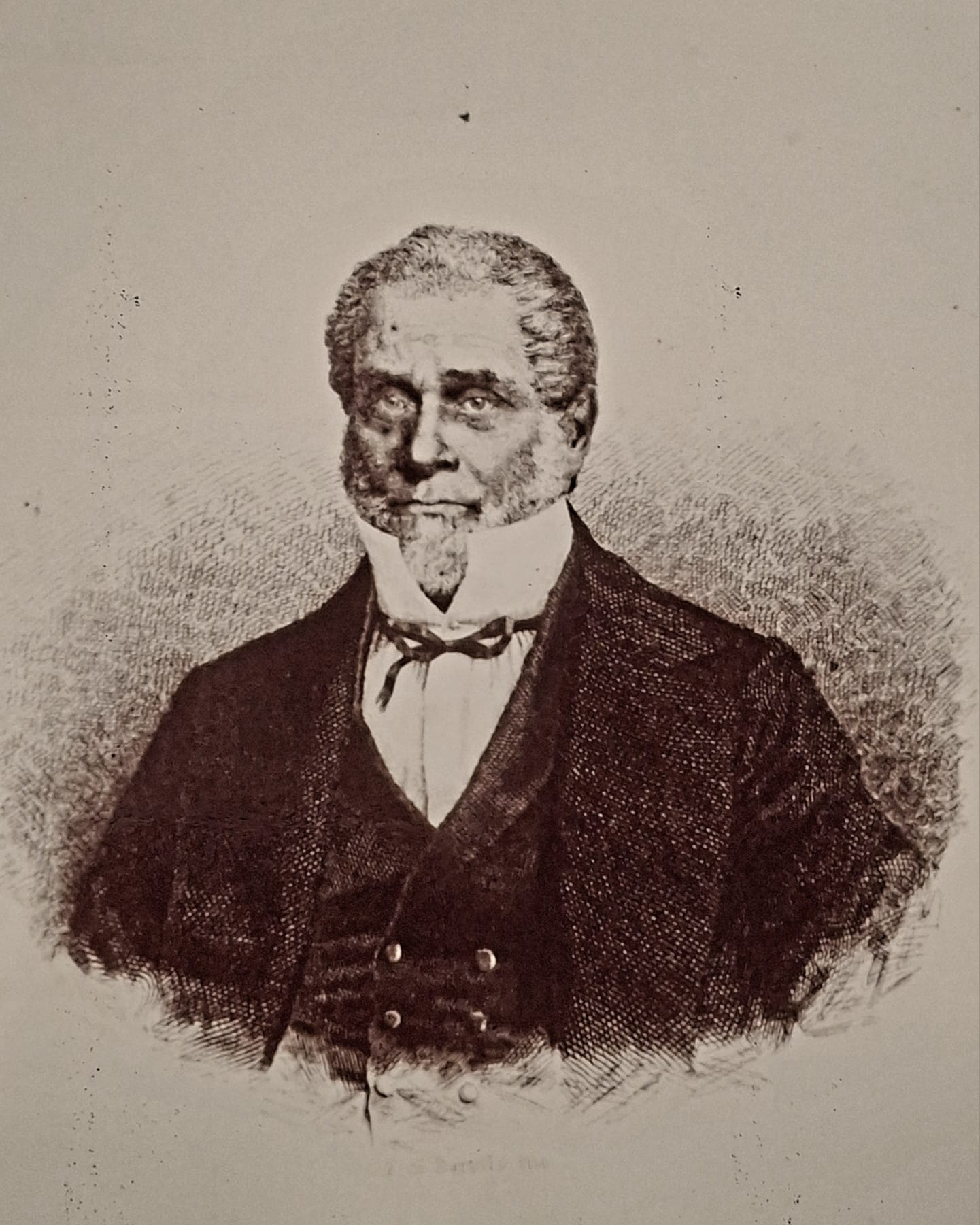
Francesco Di Bartolo, etched portrait of his uncle, Giacomo Di Bartolo, cittadino catanese (“Giacomo Di Bartolo, Citizen of Catania”)

Although his family intended him for legal studies, he showed an early inclination for the arts; he therefore refused to follow his father's profession and, under the guidance of the Sicilian neoclassical painter Giuseppe Gandolfo, learned above all the fundamentals of drawing.

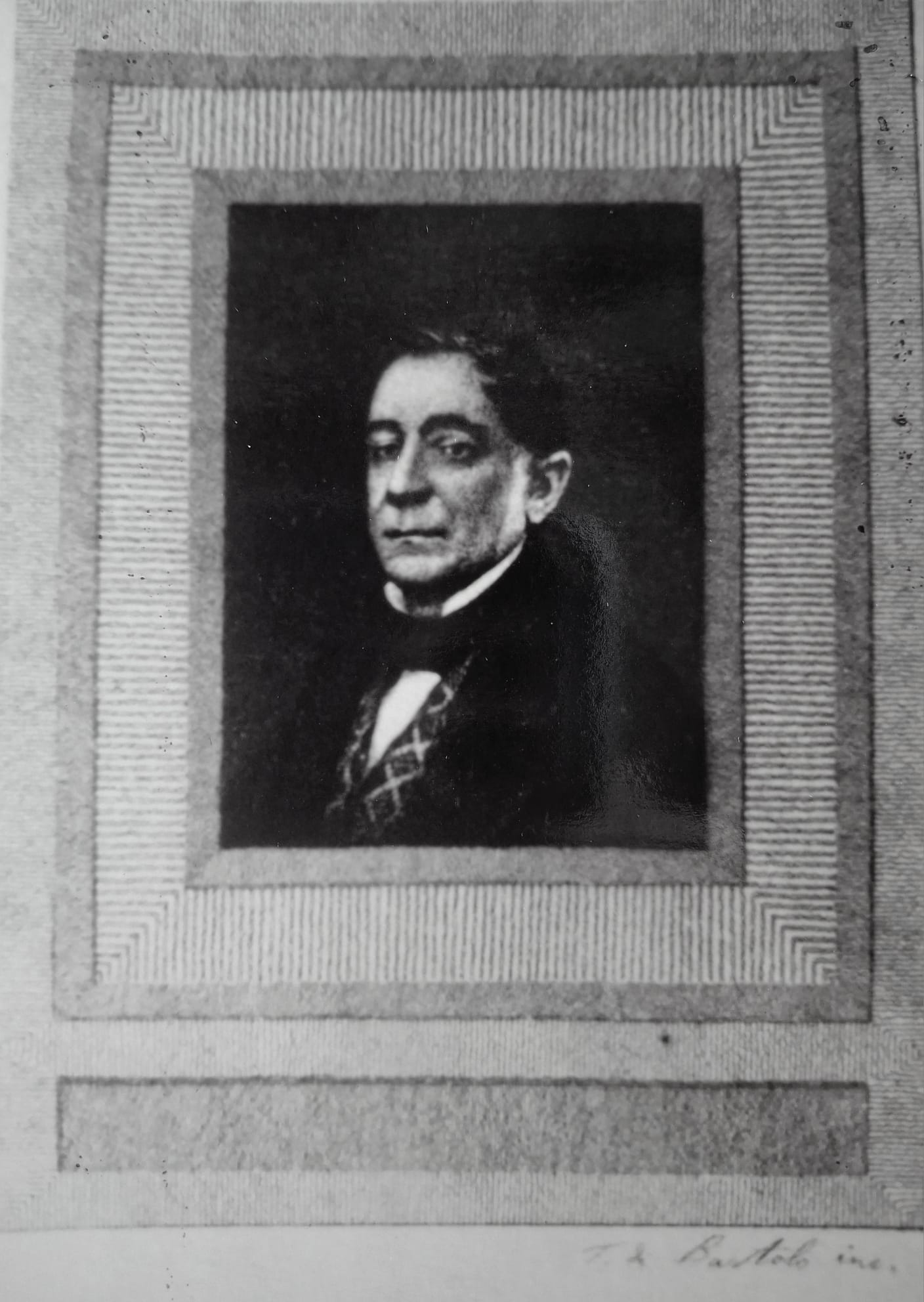
Francesco Di Bartolo, portrait of Euplio Reina, etching

In the same period he began his first experiments in copper intaglio in Catania, in connection with local makers of devotional images. The celebrated surgeon Euplio Reina, a family friend, recognized his abilities and supported the beginning of his professional career, obtaining for him his first commission in burin engraving, the Santa Marta, intended for the hospital of the same name in Catania, where Reina worked as physician and benefactor.

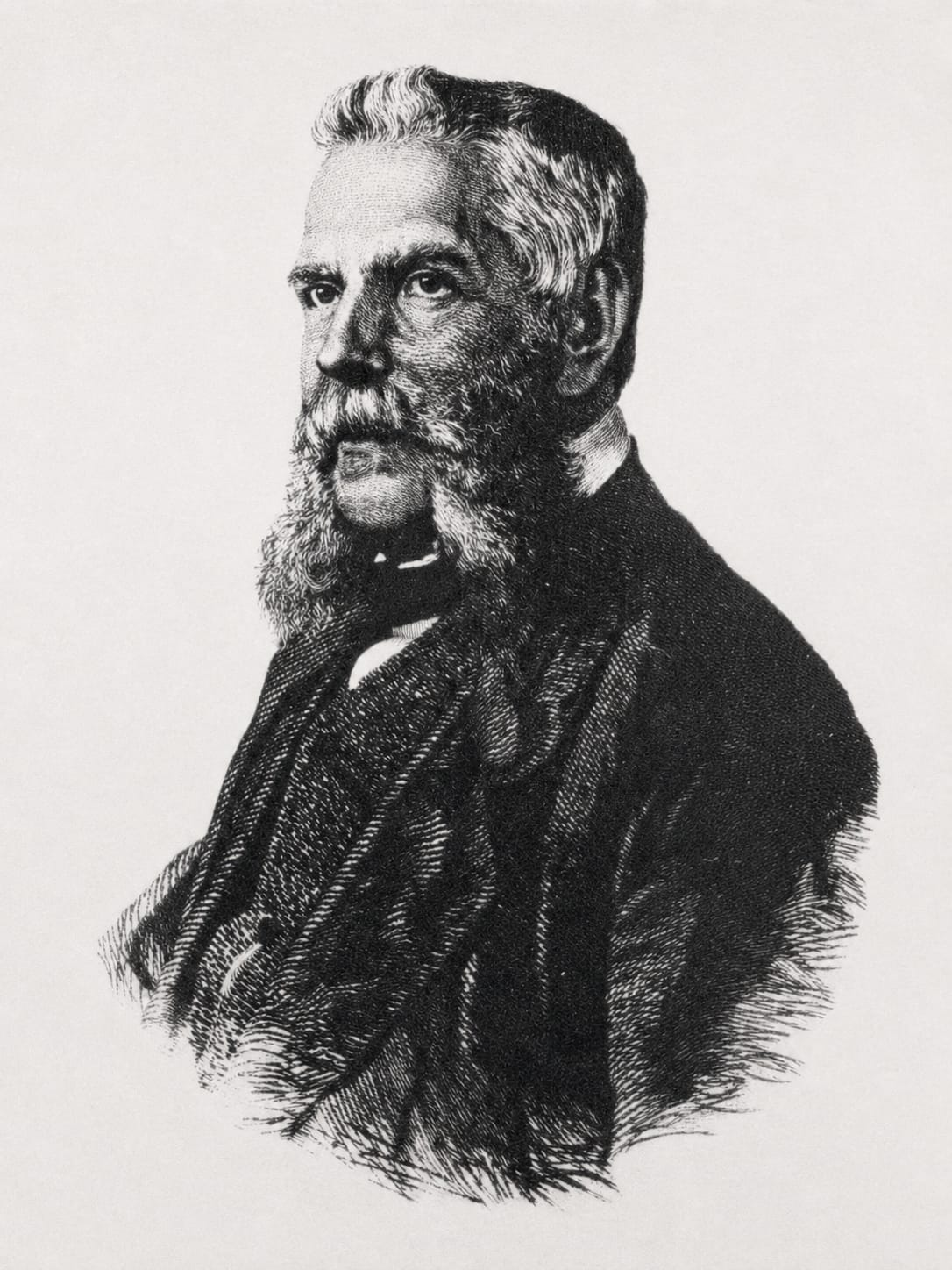
Francesco Di Bartolo, portrait of Tommaso Aloysio Juvara

Later, after obtaining, thanks to the Santa Marta, an annual subsidy of 288 ducats from the Decurionate of Catania, subsequently renewed on account of his merit in 1854, the young Di Bartolo enrolled at the Academy of Fine Arts of Naples, in the class directed by Tommaso Aloysio Juvara, who, sharing the chair with Francesco Pisante, taught the "great genre", that is, classical burin engraving, but also the "different methods", that is, alternative techniques of printmaking. Here Di Bartolo produced his first important burin engraving, the emperor Charles V after Jovita Garavaglia, and became especially devoted to etching, which he found freer and more congenial to his own inspiration. Tommaso Aloysio Juvara created a class rich in talent, a true school, which also included Saro Cucinotta and Gaetano Micale. In the same context, Di Bartolo took part in the workshop of the San Carlo Borromeo, after Giuseppe Mancinelli, assisting his master, working in burin engraving and completing the work, which was published in 1875.

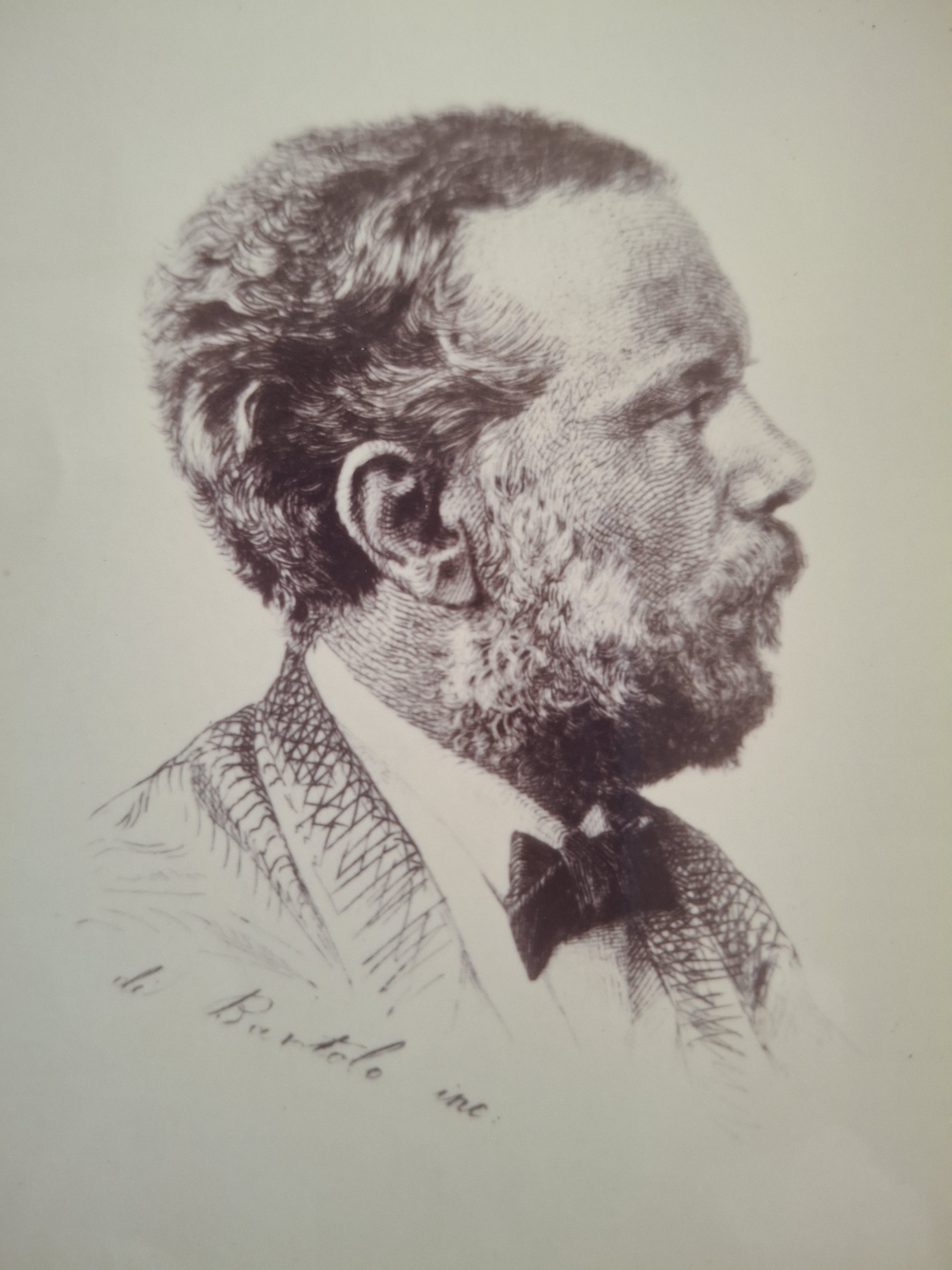
Francesco Di Bartolo, portrait of Filippo Palizzi

Di Bartolo's intaglio production, after he completed his academic studies in 1860, met with considerable approval, and the artist remained in Naples. Between academy and anti-academy, he formed friendships with artists of the Neapolitan school such as Filippo Palizzi, Domenico Morelli and Edoardo Dalbono, was one of the first members of the Società Promotrice di Belle Arti of Naples and produced some of his best-known etchings, also intended for subscribing members, such as La leggenda delle sirene after Dalbono.

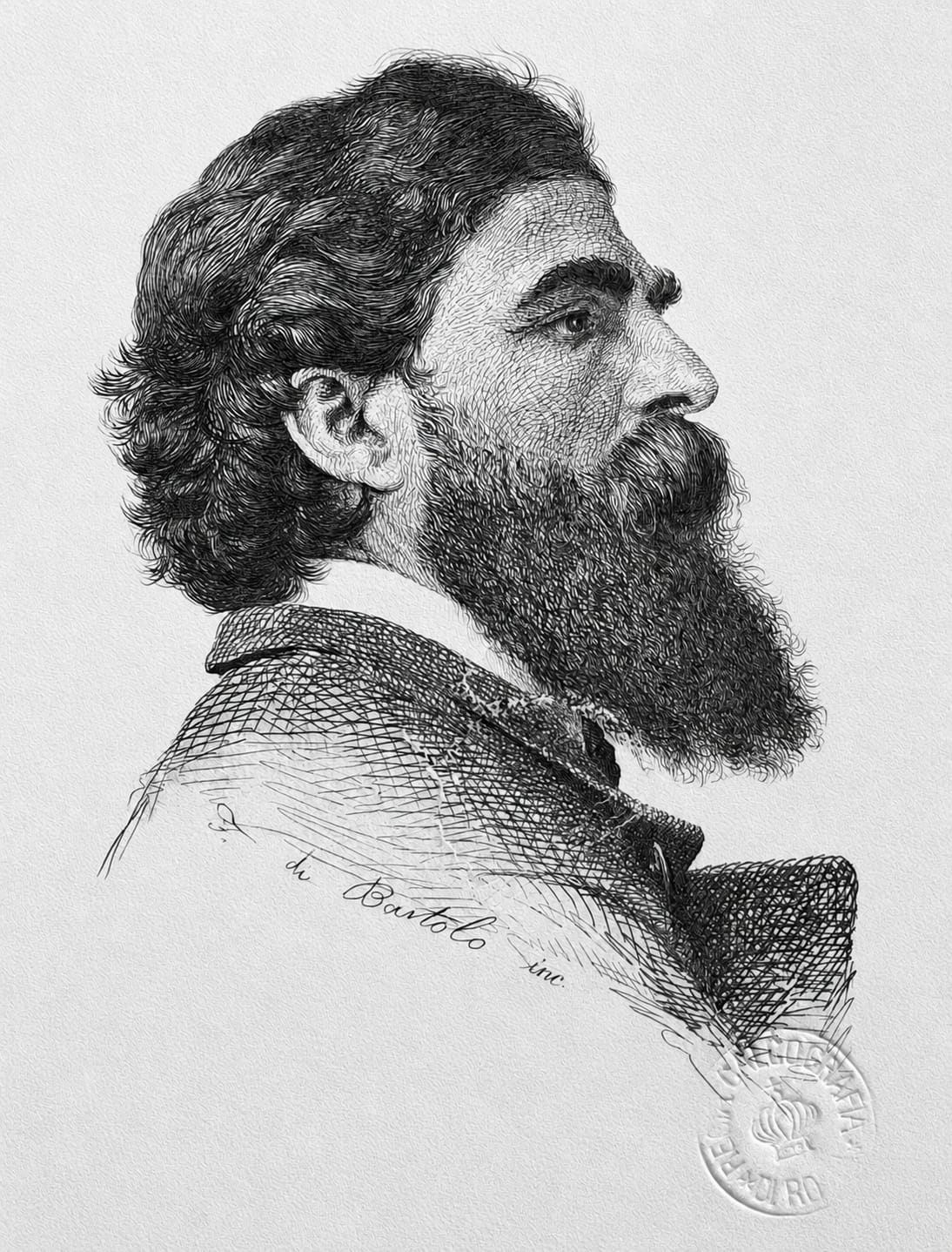
Francesco Di Bartolo, portrait of Domenico Morelli

After Palizzi he translated lively animal scenes, and after Morelli, in particular, Tasso and Princess Eleonora d'Este and The Iconoclasts, commissioned by the House of Savoy.

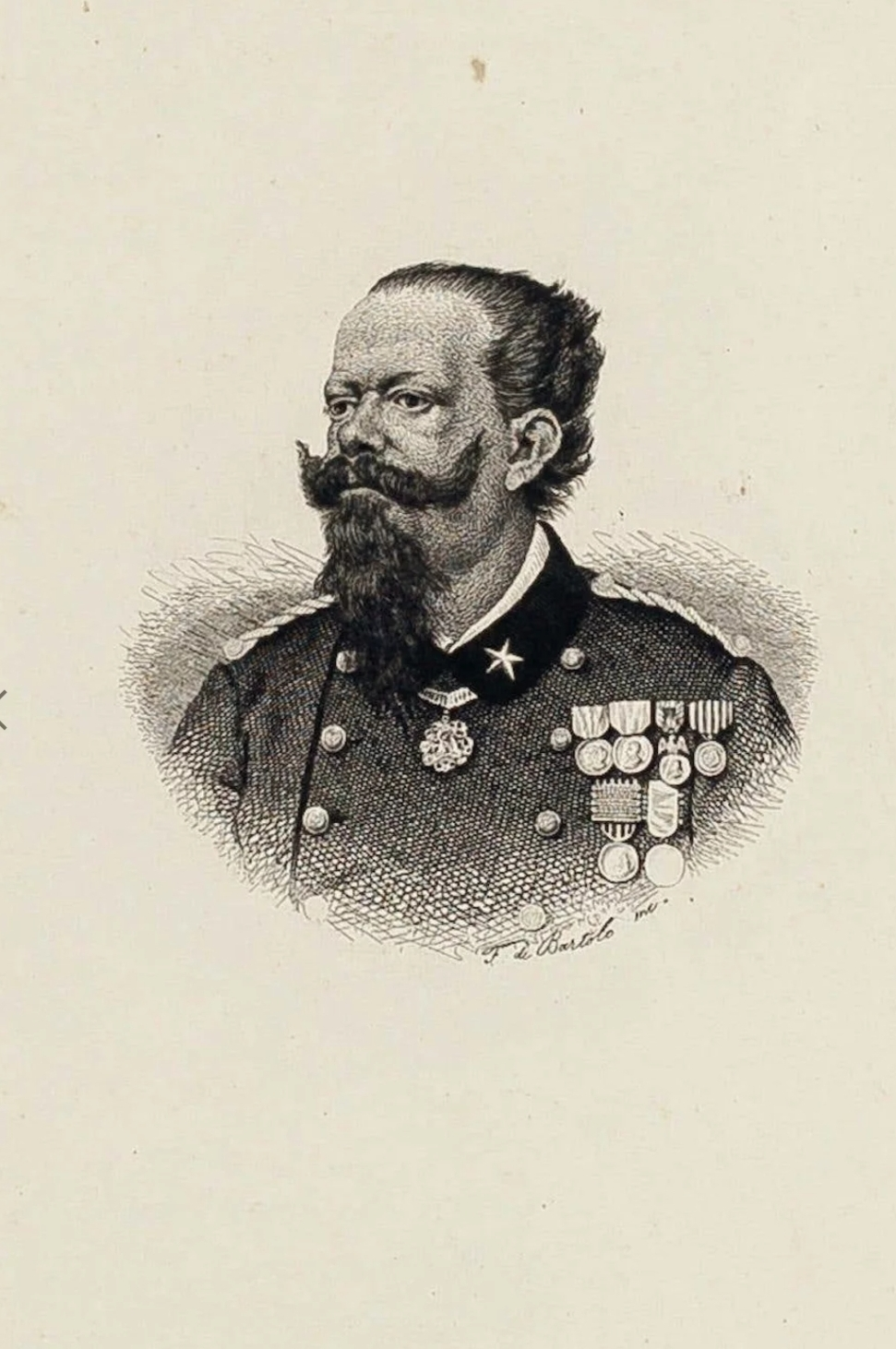
Francesco Di Bartolo, portrait of King Victor Emmanuel II

In 1864 the royal house also commissioned him to engrave the portrait of King Victor Emmanuel II, on the occasion of the transfer of the capital from Turin to Florence. With these works, Di Bartolo entered the circuit of official commissions, in which engraved translation also assumed a function of dynastic and state representation. At the same time, however, concerned that the advent of photography might "bring about the collapse of the art" of reproductive engraving, in 1863 he had submitted the burin engraving of Saint Agatha and three etchings after Palizzi to the celebrated engraver Luigi Calamatta, director of the Brera Academy, "in order to obtain an opinion", receiving appreciation and encouragement to continue with etching rather than with burin engraving. Di Bartolo then worked in etching with renewed energy. The practice of engraving continued for a long time to retain strength, prestige and continuity.

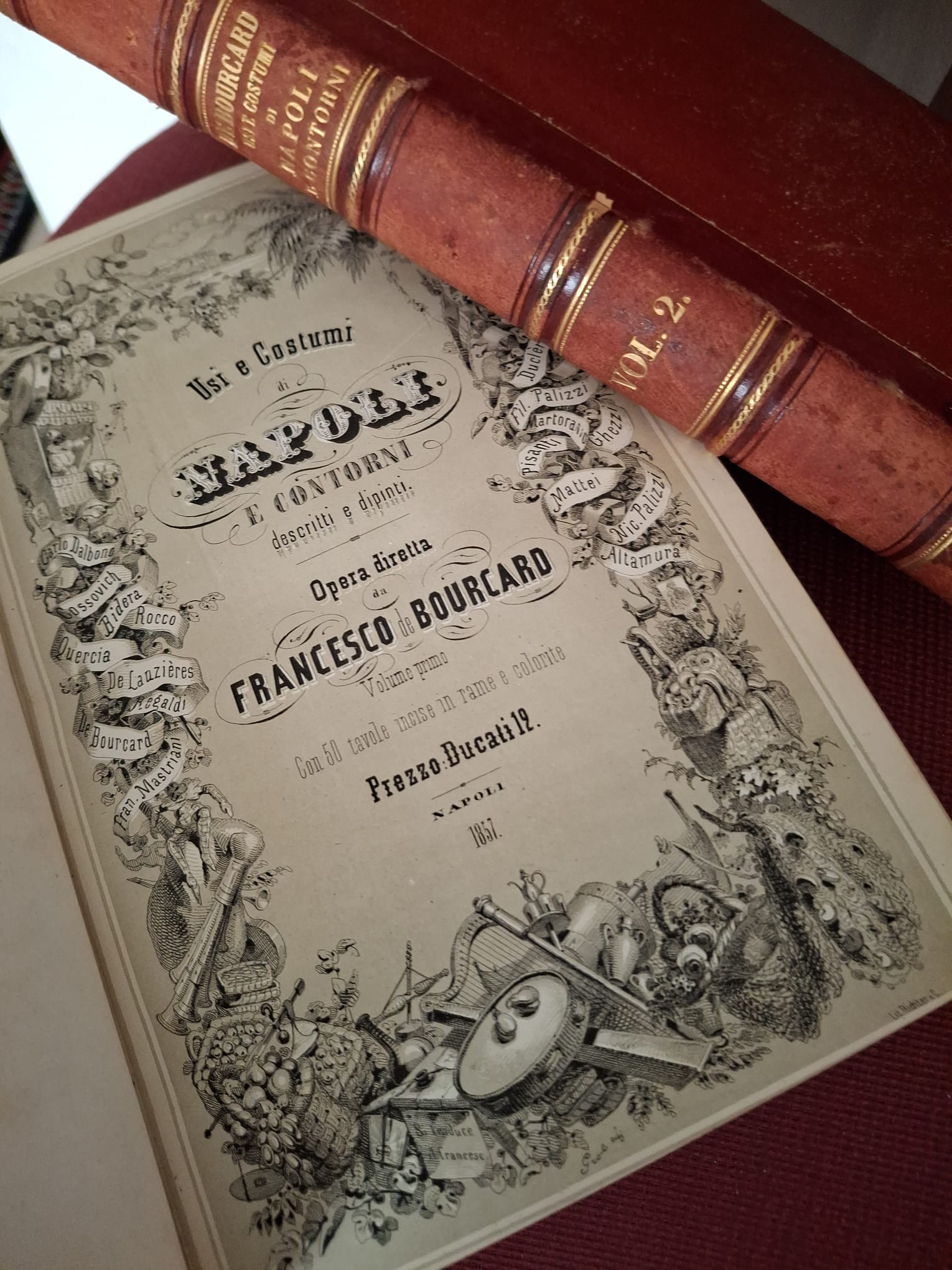
The two volumes of de Bourcard, private collection

This fact is all the more significant when one considers that Di Bartolo also entered the system of Neapolitan illustrated publishing, taking part in the enterprise of Usi e costumi di Napoli e contorni descritti e dipinti by Francesco de Bourcard, in two volumes, 1857 and 1866, one of the most important illustrated publishing works of the nineteenth-century Neapolitan milieu, in which engraving continued to perform a decisive function of translation, dissemination and circulation of images. He illustrated two chapters with two etchings, later also hand-coloured, after original drawings by Teodoro Duclère: "Il castagnaro" and "Il paludano", in the second volume, published in 1866.

His work brought him fame and also earned him the post of honorary professor "with salary" at the Neapolitan Academy of Fine Arts, where he had studied.

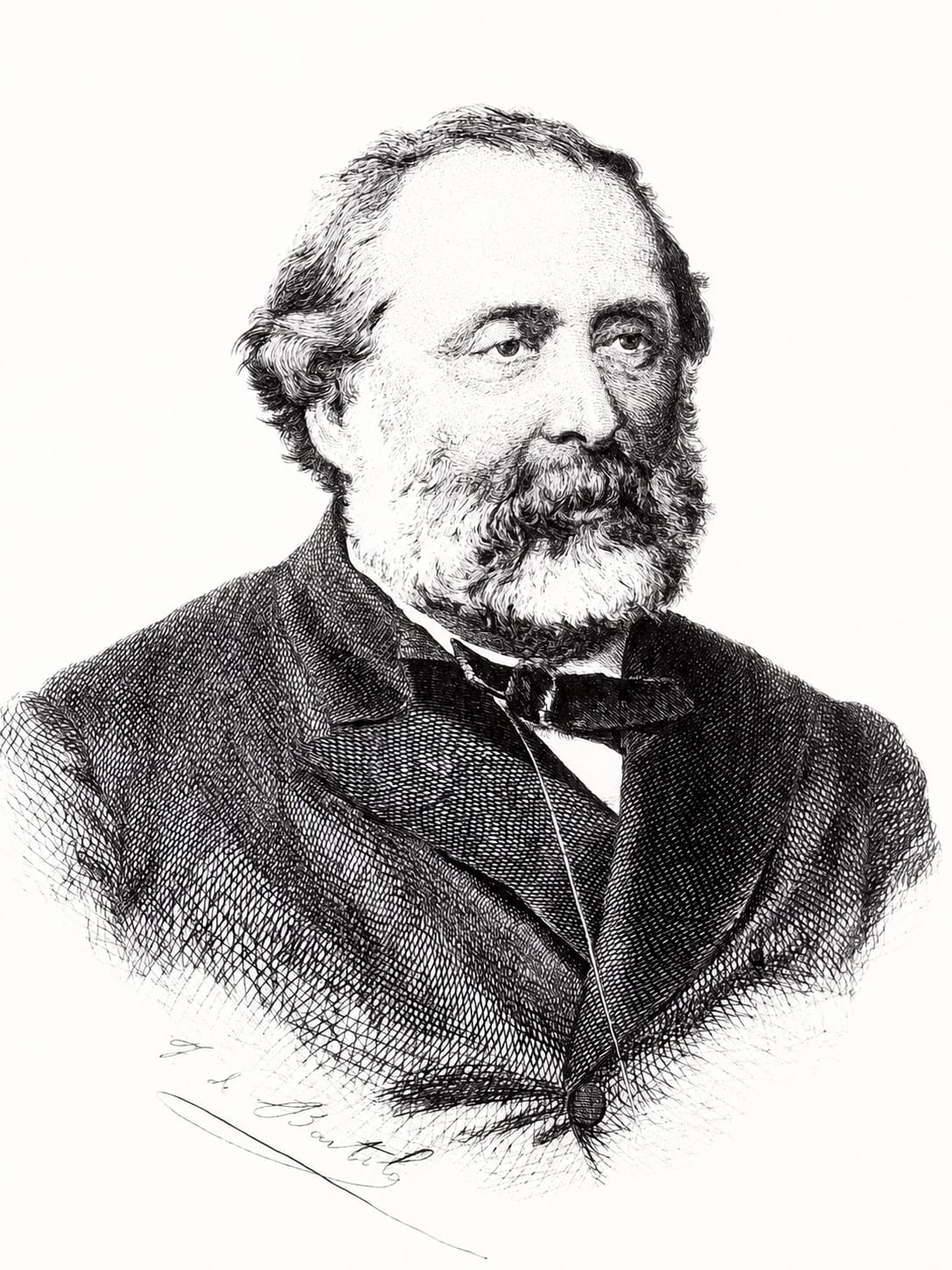
Francesco Di Bartolo, portrait of Minister Cesare Correnti

Meanwhile, he continued incessantly to work on his copper plates, still in etching, in the art of portraiture, turning his portraits into his true "original works", which would make him famous and sought after by the most varied rulers and illustrious figures of his time until the end of his life.

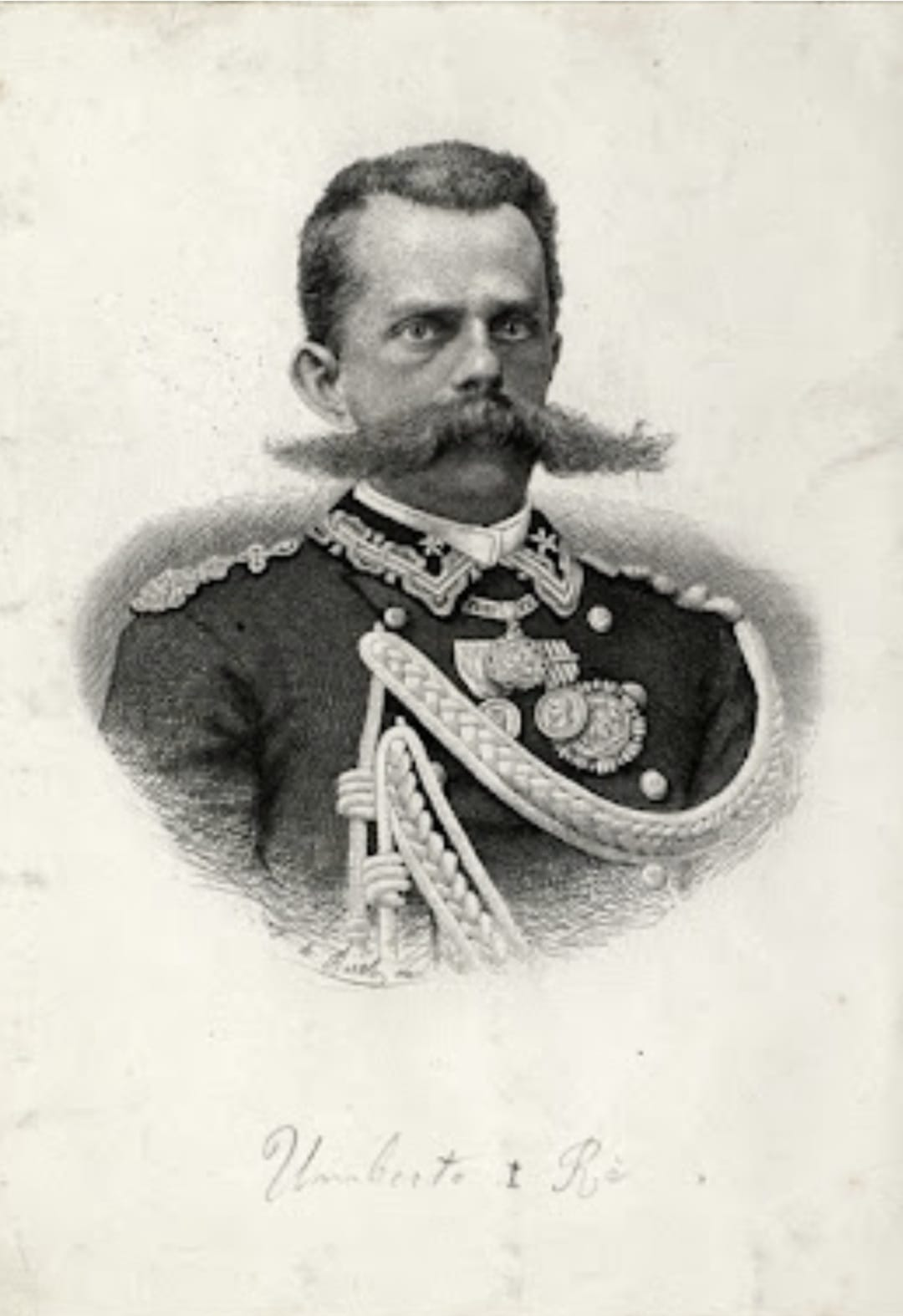
Francesco Di Bartolo, portrait of King Umberto I of Savoy

He was a renowned portraitist of the rulers of the House of Savoy, including King Umberto I and Margherita of Savoy,Queen Margherita, who granted him numerous honours, and of various illustrious men of his time, including Camillo Benso, Count of Cavour and the ministers Cesare Correnti and Salvatore Majorana Calatabiano. In 1872 he moved from the Academy of Fine Arts to the Royal State Calcography in Rome, following his master Aloysio Juvara, who had been called there by the Minister of Public Education Cesare Correnti for the reorganization and reform of the Institute and had then been appointed co-director together with Paolo Mercuri. There Di Bartolo worked on important ministerial commissions, and therefore on his most significant burin engravings, such as Sacred and Profane Love after Titian, the Madonna and Child after Murillo and the Madonna of the Harpies after Andrea del Sarto.

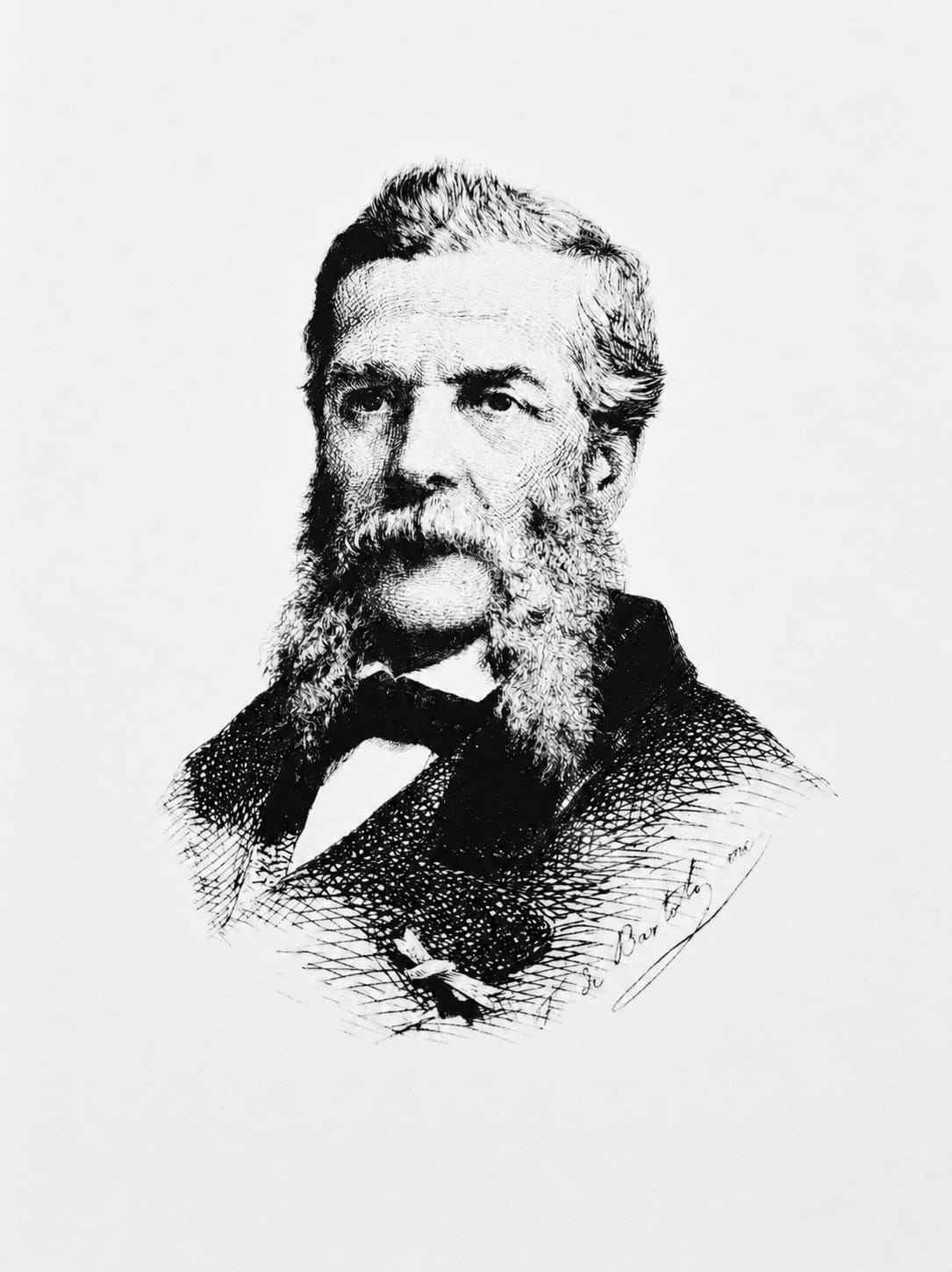
Francesco Di Bartolo, portrait of the elderly Tommaso Aloysio Juvara

He remained there even when, because of internal problems and rivalries within the Institute, his master Aloysio Juvara took his own life in 1875, continuing to struggle and work in an often hostile environment, producing graphic masterpieces such as the drawing of Michelangelo's Last Judgement, which he was not allowed to translate into an etching.

In the spring of 1876, during his years at the Royal State Calcography in Rome, Di Bartolo was in Catania, where he received Pedro II d'Alcantara, Emperor of Brazil, as a guest in his own home. Di Bartolo had also portrayed the emperor in a work that is currently untraced. He accompanied Pedro II to the university, where the emperor attended incognito a lecture by Mario Rapisardi on the final book of Dante's De Monarchia, and also accompanied him on excursions to Mount Etna.

Di Bartolo also portrayed the Bey of Tunis and received him as a guest in his home in Catania.

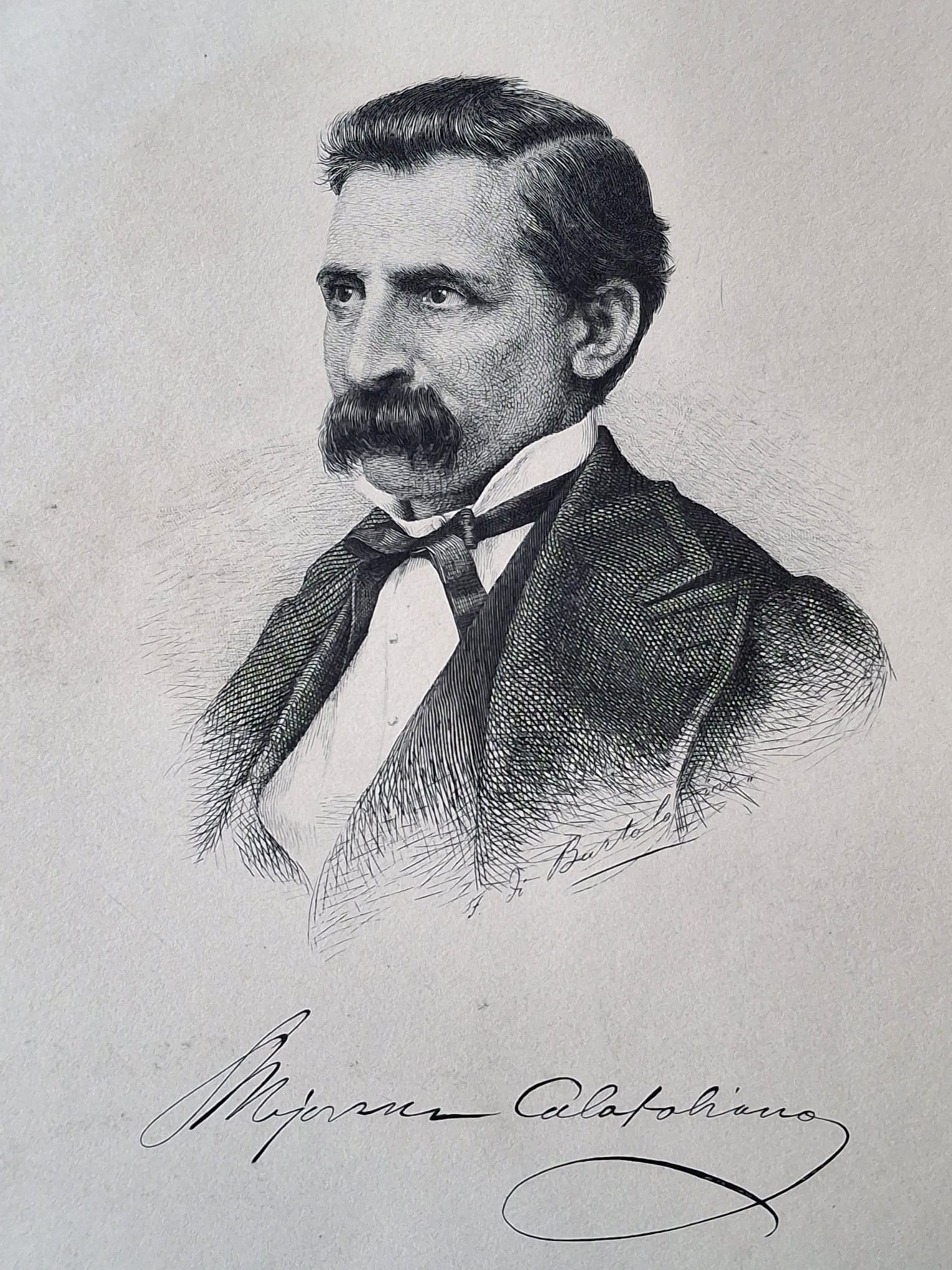
Francesco Di Bartolo, portrait of Minister Salvatore Majorana Calatabiano

In those years his position in the Roman milieu strengthened, and recognition also came with the summons by the Minister of Industry, Agriculture and Commerce Salvatore Majorana Calatabiano to take part in the artistic organization of the young Italian state in view of the Universal Exposition of Paris, held in 1878, in which Di Bartolo participated as a juror. He therefore appeared there not only as an exhibiting artist, but as a figure entrusted with representing Italian expertise in the field of applied arts and artistic industries. The appointment placed him at the heart of the Italian organization of the event; he entered the state machinery of juries, classifications, reports and national representations through which the young Kingdom of Italy presented its artistic and industrial image to Europe.

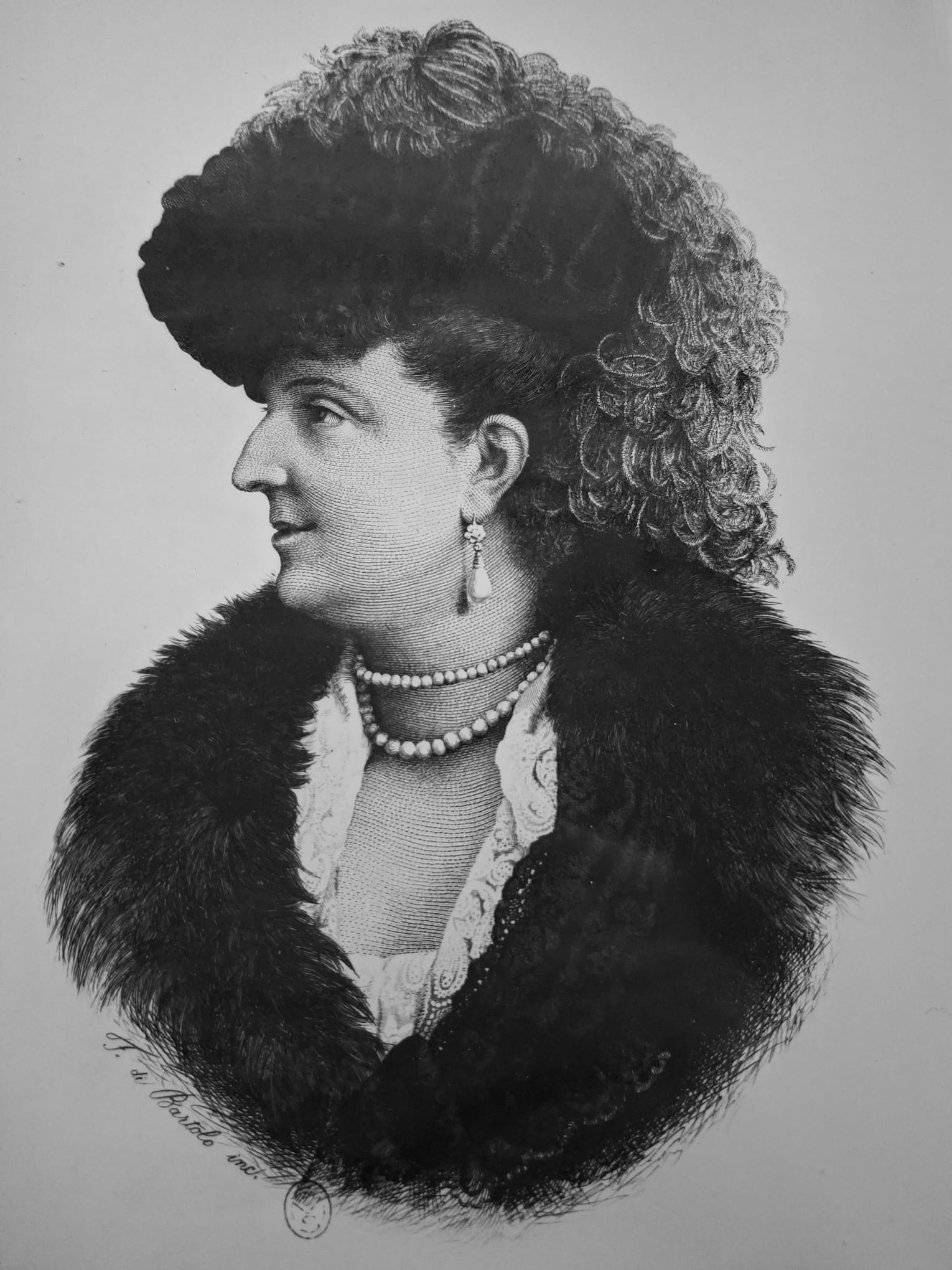
Francesco Di Bartolo, official portrait of Queen Margherita of Savoy

In Paris Di Bartolo took part in the dual capacity of exhibitor in the engraving section and juror. His name is linked to Class XVII, relating to inexpensive and luxury furniture, and to Class XVIII, devoted to the work of upholsterers and decorators; the juries of the two classes in fact decided to join together because of the connection between the industries under consideration. Di Bartolo wrote the official report Industria dell'intaglio in legno, intarsio e mosaico in Italia, included in the Annali del Ministero di Agricoltura, Industria e Commercio – Esposizione Universale del 1878 in Parigi, published in Rome in 1879, dealing in particular with the artistic part of the industries covered by the two classes.

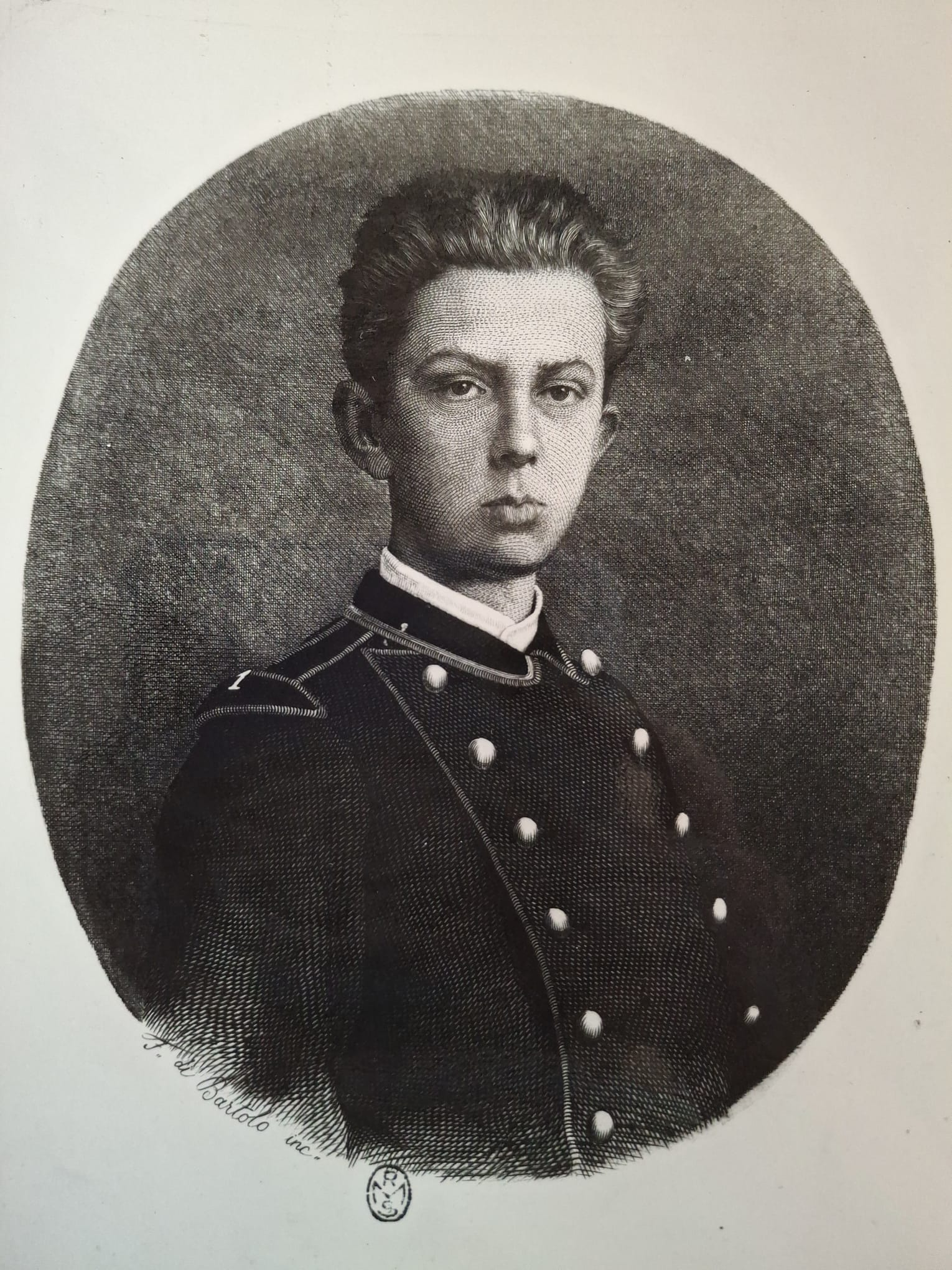
Francesco Di Bartolo, portrait of Prince Victor Emmanuel III of Savoy

The appointment documents the recognition of Di Bartolo not only as an artist, but also in technical and institutional terms, as he was called to assess Italian production in an international setting in which art, industry, decoration and the modern organization of the image were brought into direct comparison.

His participation in Paris also had an official sequel. After the close of the Exposition, Di Bartolo received a sovereign recognition for the merits acquired during the event, together with the commemorative medal sent by the French Government. The episode confirms the role assumed by the engraver not merely as the author of exhibited works, but as a representative of Italian artistic culture in an international context regulated by juries, ministerial reports and institutional hierarchies.

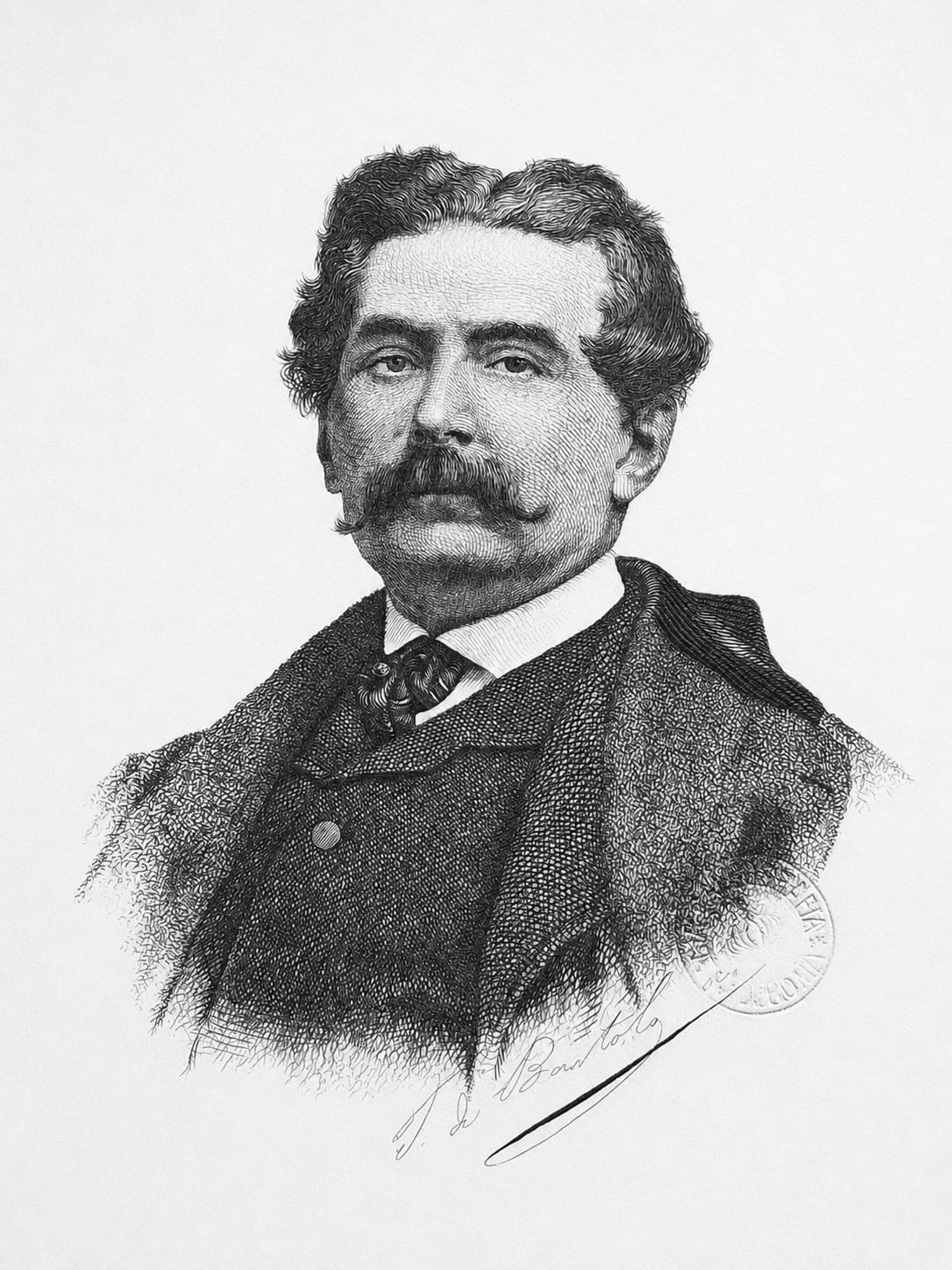
Francesco Di Bartolo, portrait of Eleuterio Pagliano

In all national and foreign exhibitions Di Bartolo showed his splendid engravings, especially his etchings, winning prizes and gold medals. His exhibition activity is documented from the 1859 Exhibition of Fine Arts at the Royal Bourbon Museum in Naples, where he exhibited six engravings and obtained a silver medal; from the Universal Exposition of Paris of 1867, where he presented The Iconoclasts after Morelli; from the First Italian Exhibition of Fine Arts in Parma in 1870, where he obtained another silver medal;

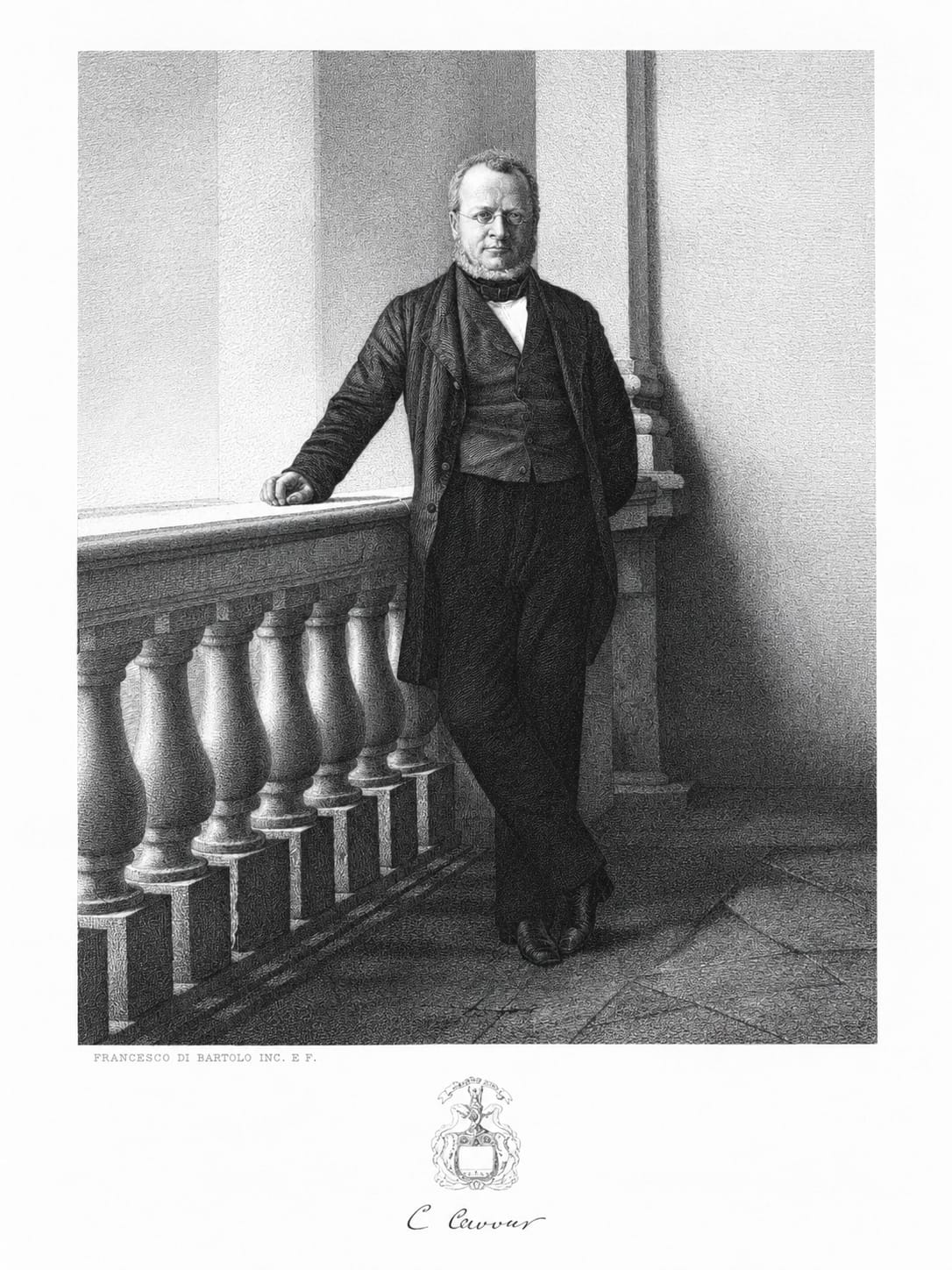
Francesco Di Bartolo, portrait of Camillo Benso, Count of Cavour

from the Universal Exposition of Vienna of 1873, where the works he sent were awarded a bronze medal; from the Promotrice of Palermo in 1876, where the Portrait of the Count of Cavour won him the gold medal; and from the Exhibition of Messina in 1882. At the Vatican World Exhibition in Rome in 1888 he obtained the gold medal with the copper engraving of the Pope, Il S. Padre Leone XIII.

For his works he was appreciated in France, Germany and England, and numerous academies elected him an honorary member. A significant part of his graphic production is also documented in the collections of the British Museum, which preserves eleven sheets connected with his corpus, including engraved portraits of Tommaso Aloysio Juvara, Filippo Palizzi, Domenico Morelli, Giulio Monteverde, Eleuterio Pagliano, Stefano Ussi, Francesco Saverio Altamura, Giovanni Dupré and Cesare Correnti, as well as The Legend of the Sirens after Edoardo Dalbono.

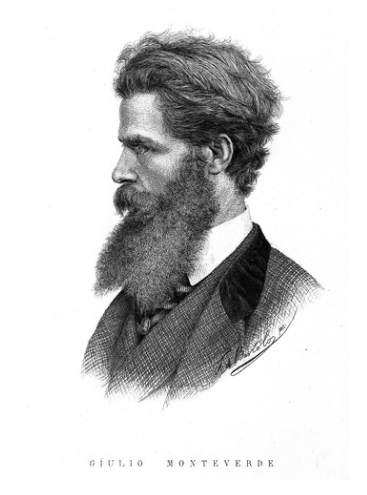
Francesco Di Bartolo, portrait of sculptor Giulio Monteverde

In Russia, the Imperial Academy of Saint Petersburg appointed him honorary professor. The recognition from Saint Petersburg should not be understood as a generic foreign distinction: the Imperial Academy of Saint Petersburg was one of the major artistic institutions of the Russian Empire, the official centre for the training and legitimation of artists. Di Bartolo's inclusion among its honorary professors therefore attests to the consideration achieved by his engraved work outside Italy, in a European academic circuit in which the prestige of drawing, reproductive engraving and portraiture retained full institutional value.

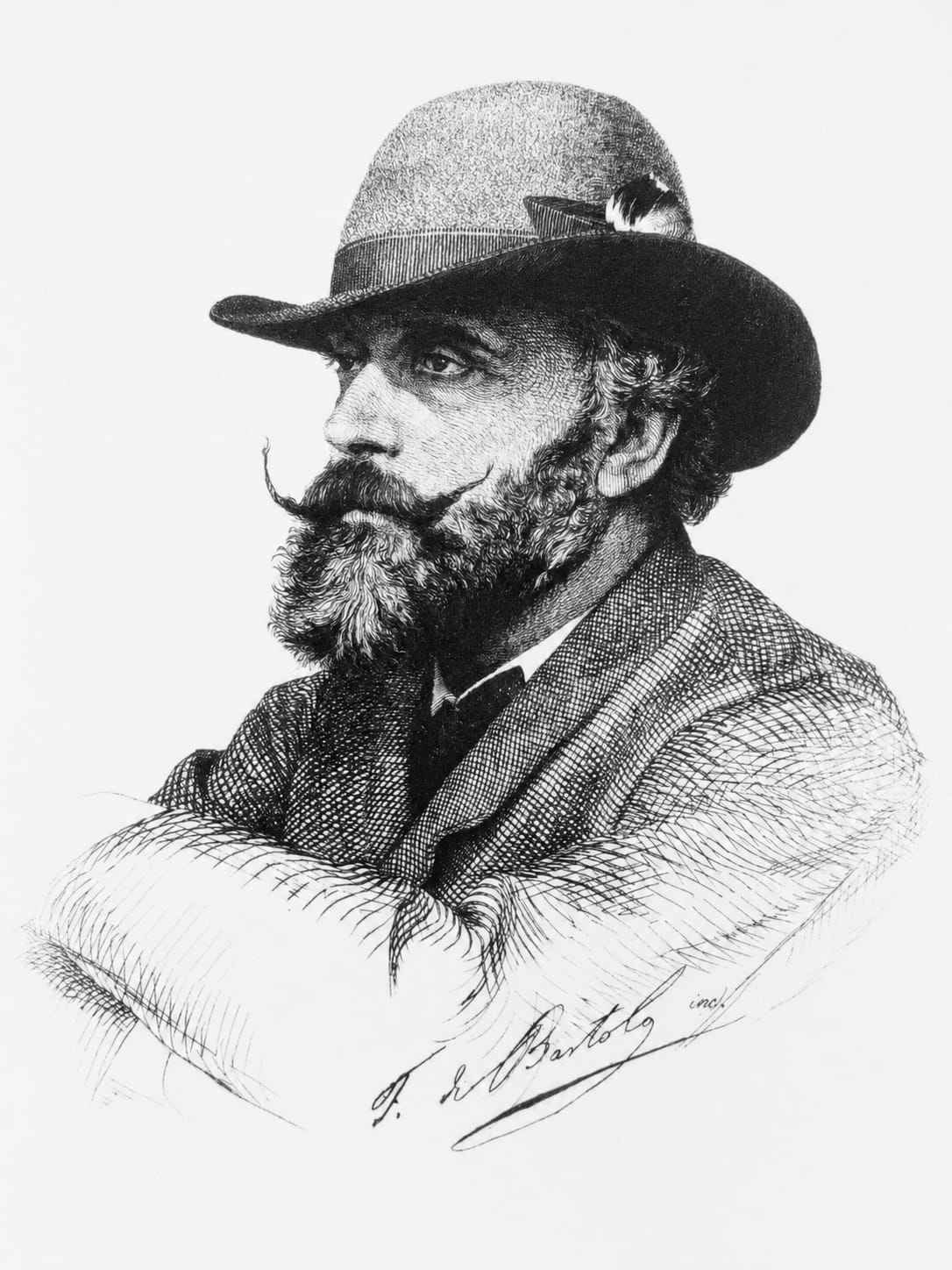
Francesco Di Bartolo, portrait of Stefano Ussi

Exhibition success was thus accompanied by international academic recognition, consistent with the circulation of his work and with the role assumed by the artist in the exhibitions and artistic institutions of the second half of the nineteenth century. He continued to work at the Royal Calcography until, on account of his advanced age, after selling his Neapolitan plates to the Institute, so that they would not be dispersed, for the symbolic price of ten thousand lire, he returned definitively to Catania at the end of the century, to the villa in the district of Cibali, where he maintained relations with Mario Rapisardi, Calcedonio Reina, Giovanni Verga, Gaetano Ardizzoni and many others, not only from Catania.

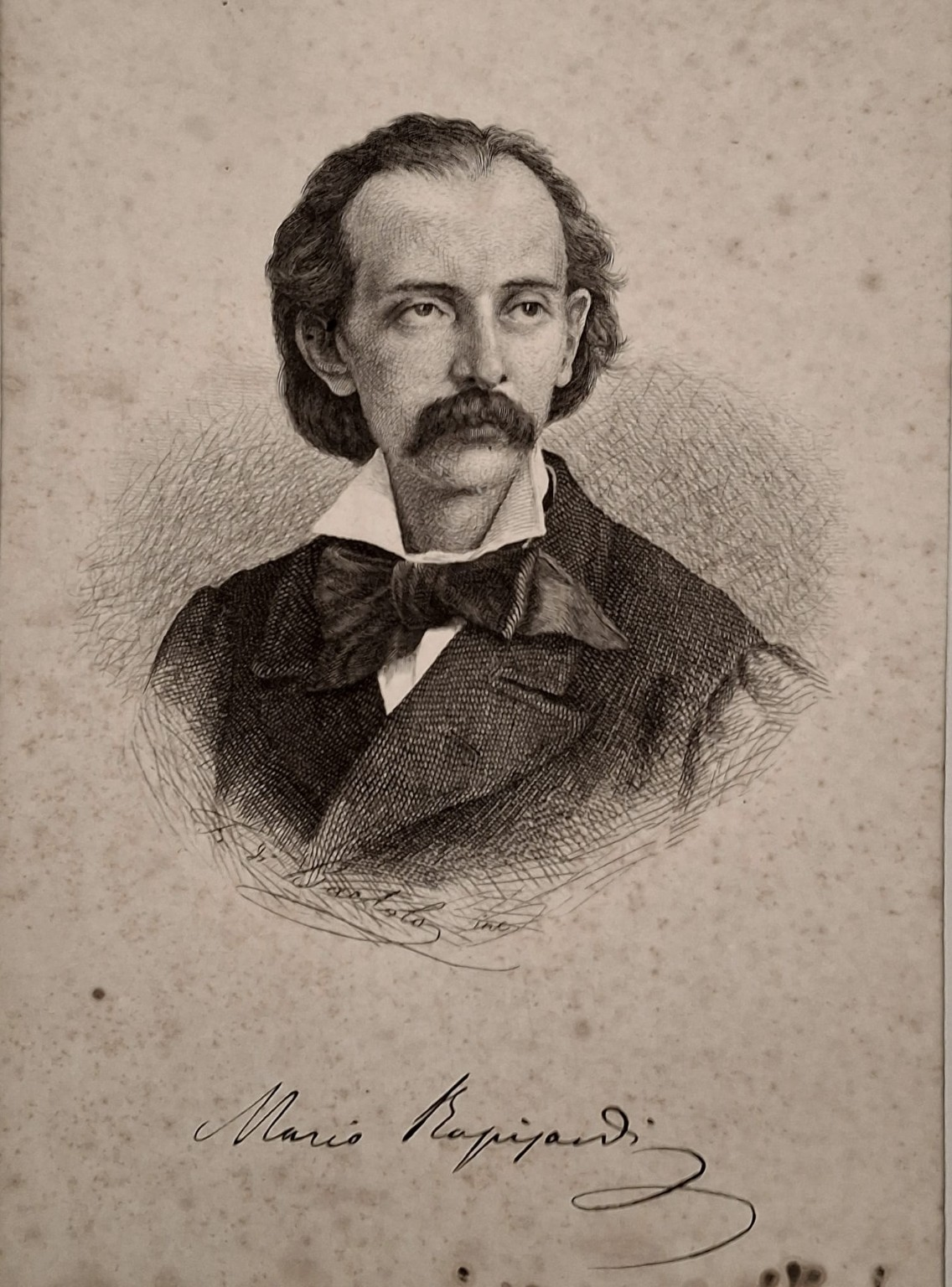
Francesco Di Bartolo, portrait of Mario Rapisardi

In his city he was entrusted with the direction of the Civic Museum and the presidency of the Council of the School of Arts and Crafts. He was an authoritative member of the executive committee of the Second Sicilian Agricultural Exhibition, held in Catania in 1907. After the close of the exhibition he obtained a diploma with gold medal for the effective contribution he had rendered and received yet another honour; according to Musumeci, on the same occasion he refused two further honours because he already possessed them. He was also the first President of the Artistic Circle and a member of various commissions.

He did not cease working, despite the fact that his eyesight had almost entirely failed him, devoting himself to his last engravings and above all to the painting of still lifes, which he exhibited without placing them on the market, reserving them for relatives as wedding gifts or for important occasions.

Francesco Di Bartolo died on Monday, 2 February 1913, following a syncope that occurred as a complication of bronchopneumonia. He was eighty-seven years old. He is buried in the Cemetery of Catania, in the family tomb that he himself designed and had built, in white marble, in the ground, in the shadow of a large cross, also of white marble, which still rises today above the sacred burial place, in Viale S. Paolo and not in the avenue of the Illustrious Men, in accordance with his wishes.

=== Family, residences and genealogical tradition ===
Antonino Di Bartolo, Francesco’s father, had several children who distinguished themselves as artists, lawyers, engineers, patriots and participants in the civic life of Catania.

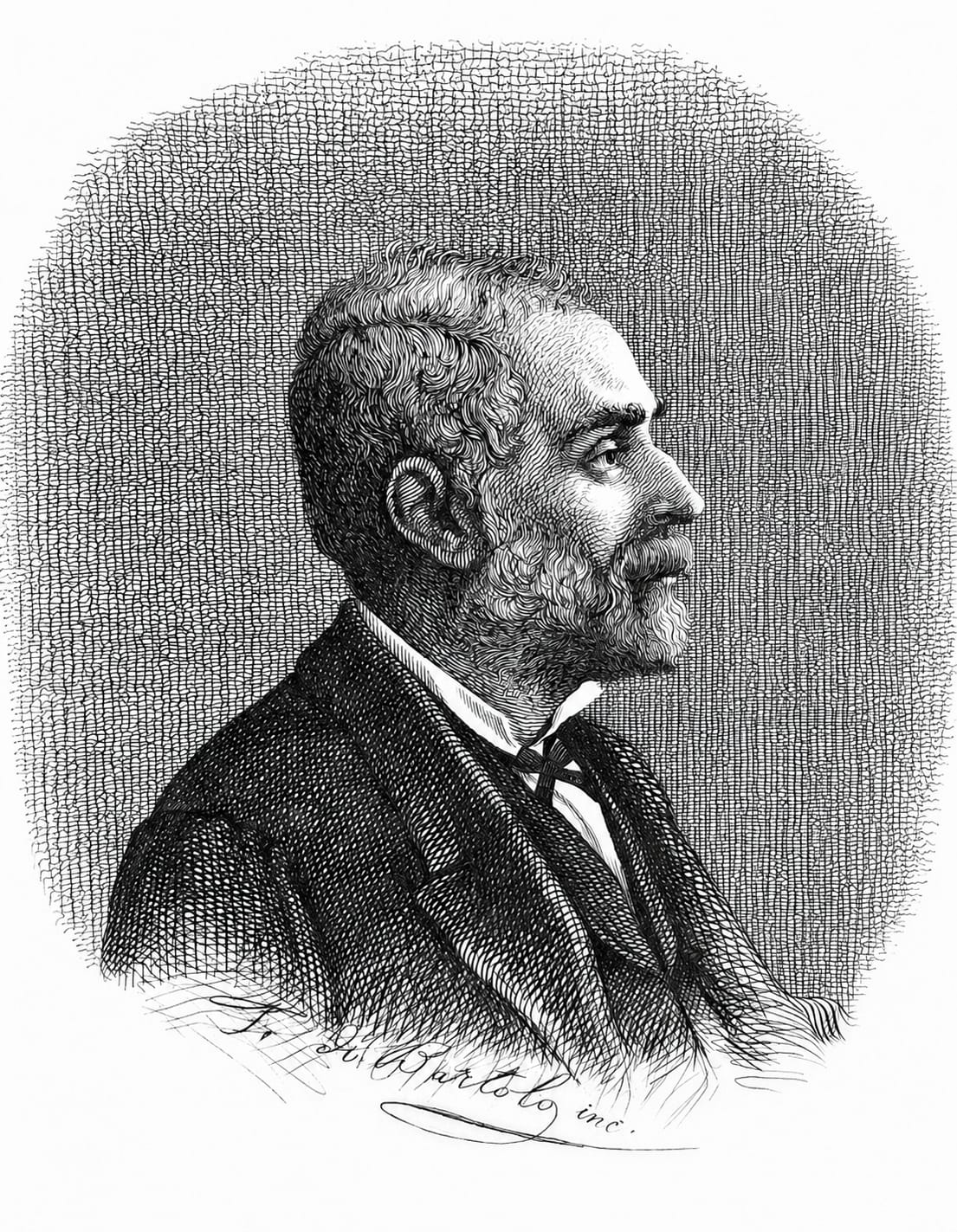
Francesco Di Bartolo, etched portrait of his brother Salvatore

Salvatore Di Bartolo, the eldest, and his brother Gaetano Di Bartolo were both portrayed in etchings by Francesco.

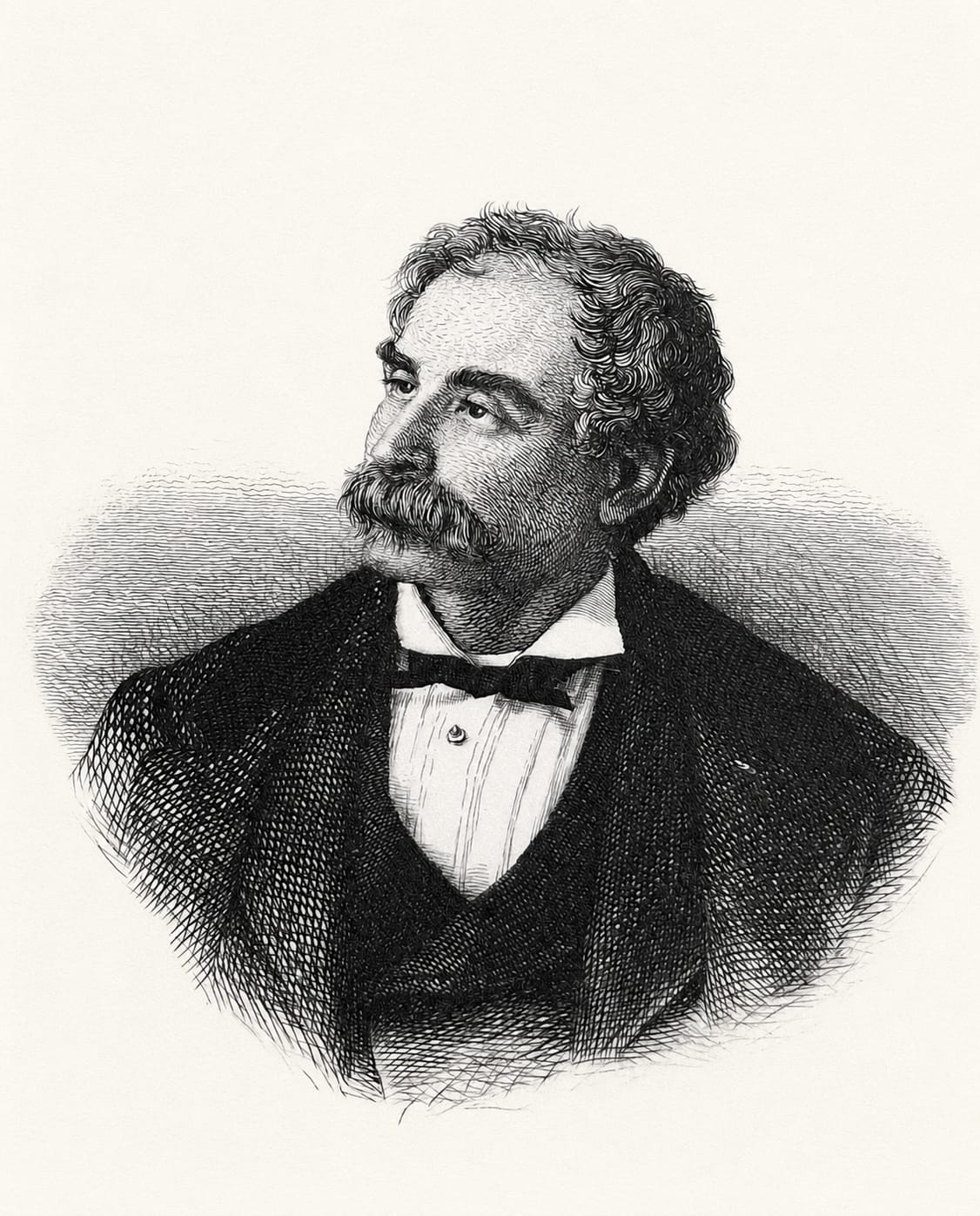
Francesco Di Bartolo, etched portrait of his brother Gaetano

Gaetano became a highly renowned lawyer and was remembered as the Prince of the Catania Bar. Another brother, Paolo, was a veteran of the Italian patriotic campaigns and a goldsmith; he also pursued floriculture as a personal passion. Giacomo, an engineer, designed the Casalotto aqueduct, which became a permanent part of the water-supply system of the Catania area. Documents relating to the project are preserved under his name in the Biblioteche Riunite “Civica e A. Ursino Recupero” in Catania. The Casalotto system continues to operate in the Catania area. Giacomo married Anna Carnazza Puglisi, daughter of the jurist and patriot Gabriello Carnazza Puglisi.

Family memory also preserved a tradition, extending across several generations, of alternating between legal and technical professions, particularly between lawyers and engineers, together with the recurring use of the names Paolo, Giacomo and Gaetano, a characteristic feature of Sicilian families with a strong genealogical consciousness.

The Di Bartolo family owned a palazzo on Via di Sangiuliano in Catania. Francesco Di Bartolo also purchased the villa at Cibali, which became one of the principal places associated with the family’s domestic and artistic history.

The villa, surrounded by extensive gardens, also had a greenhouse in which Paolo Di Bartolo cultivated his plants. Family memory recalled it as a residence of considerable dignity and prestige, capable of receiving distinguished guests. Among those who stayed there were Emperor Pedro II of Brazil in 1876, the Bey of Tunis and the sculptor Giulio Monteverde, who was in Catania for the installation and inauguration of the monument to Vincenzo Bellini.

Francesco collected genealogical information, family memories, works of art and other testimonies relating to the Di Bartolo family, preserving and studying its history. The genealogical tradition that he cultivated traced the family back to the Di Bartolo of Siena and emphasized its ancient nobility, which family memory associated further with artistic distinction and marriage alliances with noble families.

In 2026, on the occasion of the bicentenary of his birth, art historian Natalia Di Bartolo, the last descendant of Francesco and of the Di Bartolo family, great-granddaughter of engineer Giacomo and Anna Carnazza Puglisi, and owner and curator of the private collection of the artist's works, devoted a corpus of studies to his engraved, graphic and painted oeuvre. Her work also aims, as far as the surviving sources allow, to reconstruct the documentary gaps caused over time by neglect, dispersal and theft.[23]

This genealogical account referred in particular to Taddeo di Bartolo and Giovanni di Bartolo da Siena, a goldsmith, sculptor and metalworker who created the celebrated reliquary bust of Saint Agatha, commissioned in the fourteenth century by Bishop Marziale and preserved in Catania Cathedral.

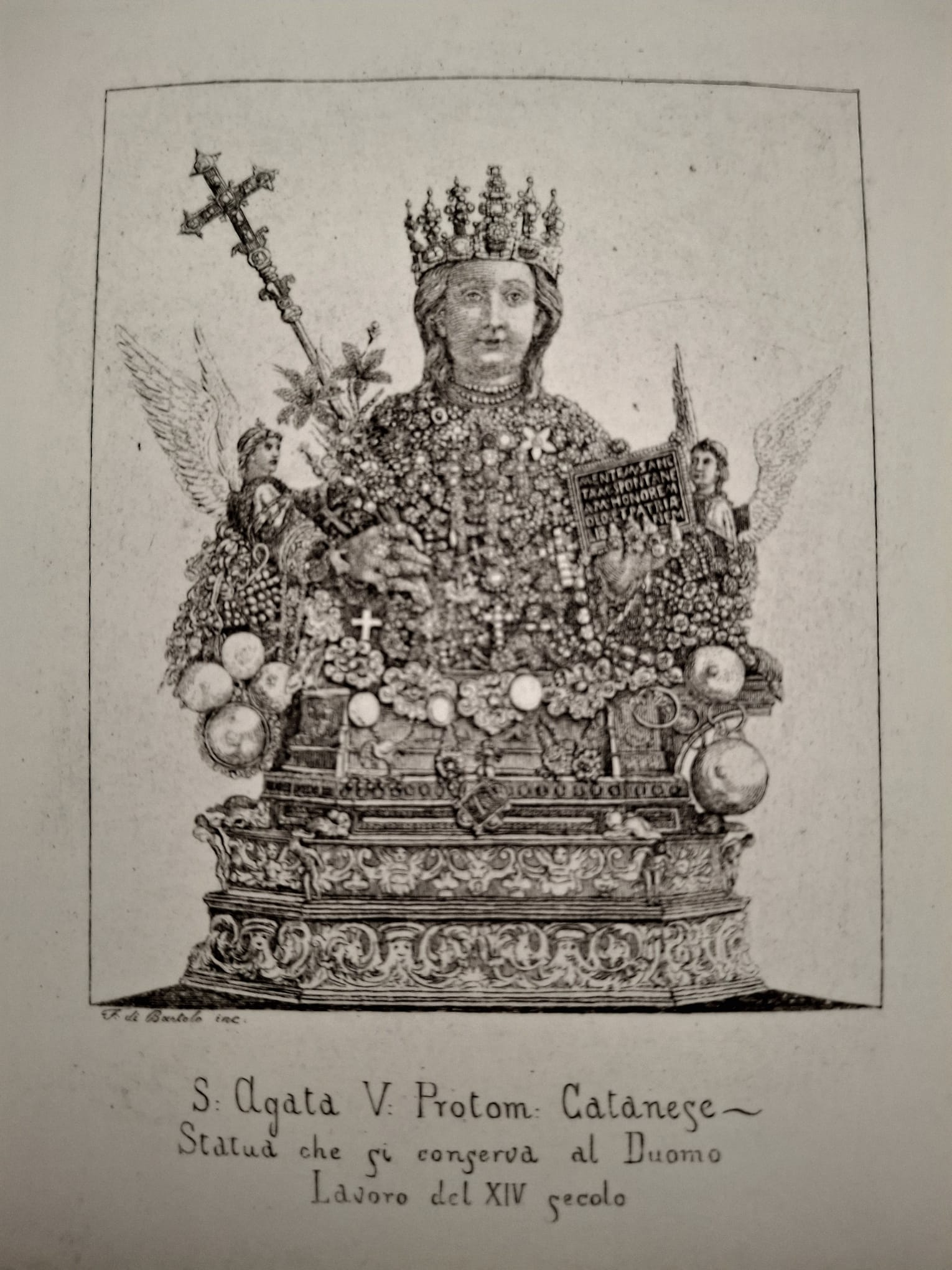
Francesco Di Bartolo, etched depiction of the reliquary bust of Saint Agatha

Francesco habitually signed his engravings “F. di Bartolo”, using a lower-case initial for the particle. According to family tradition, this practice reflected the genealogical continuity of the name and, in particular, the memory of the Sienese di Bartolo family, beginning with Taddeo di Bartolo.

Family tradition also remembered the Di Bartolo as former merchants of precious stones with commercial links to the East. This gave particular symbolic significance to Giacomo Di Bartolo’s decision to enter the jewellery trade and, later, to donate a pearl to Saint Agatha.

The family also preserved the memory of its coat of arms, corresponding to that recorded for the Di Bartolo or Bartoli families of Sicily in Antonino Mango di Casalgerardo’s Nobiliario di Sicilia.

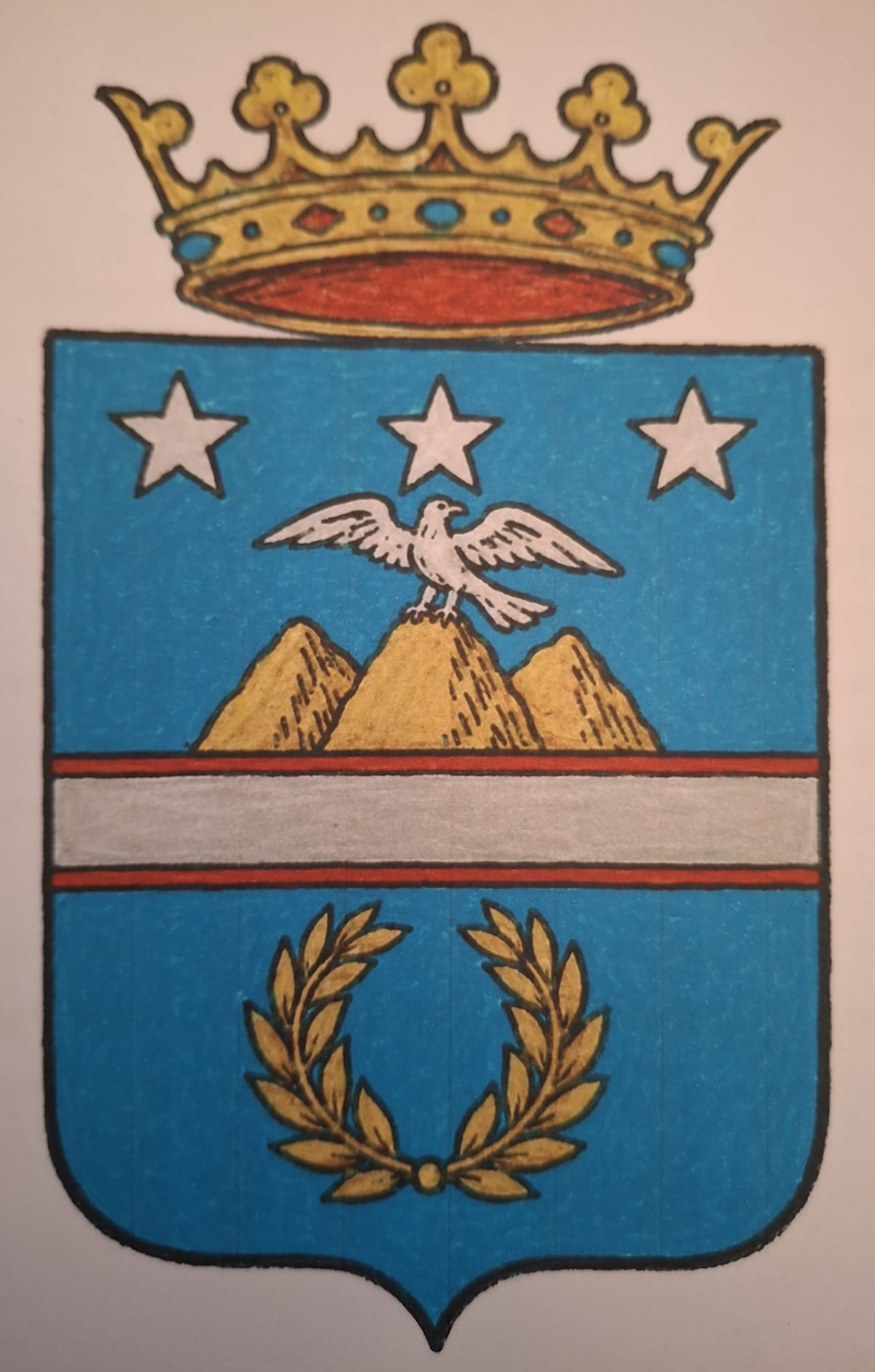
Coat of arms of the Di Bartolo family

The heraldic and genealogical papers collected by Francesco were dispersed following a theft from the family’s villa at Cibali in 1959. The reconstruction therefore relies on family memory transmitted by his descendants and on evidence found in historical reference works.

In Mango’s repertory, the “Bartolo (Di) or Bartoli” family is listed among those that enjoyed noble status in Messina during the sixteenth century and, according to Galluppi, held the lordship of the castle of Vizzini. The Mastra nobile compiled by Mollica also records a Francesco Di Bartulu in 1590.

The coat of arms is described as divided horizontally by a narrow silver fess edged in red. The upper field is azure, bearing a golden mount of three peaks surmounted by a silver dove in flight and accompanied in chief by three silver stars; the lower field, also azure, bears a golden laurel wreath.

=== The portraitist portrayed ===
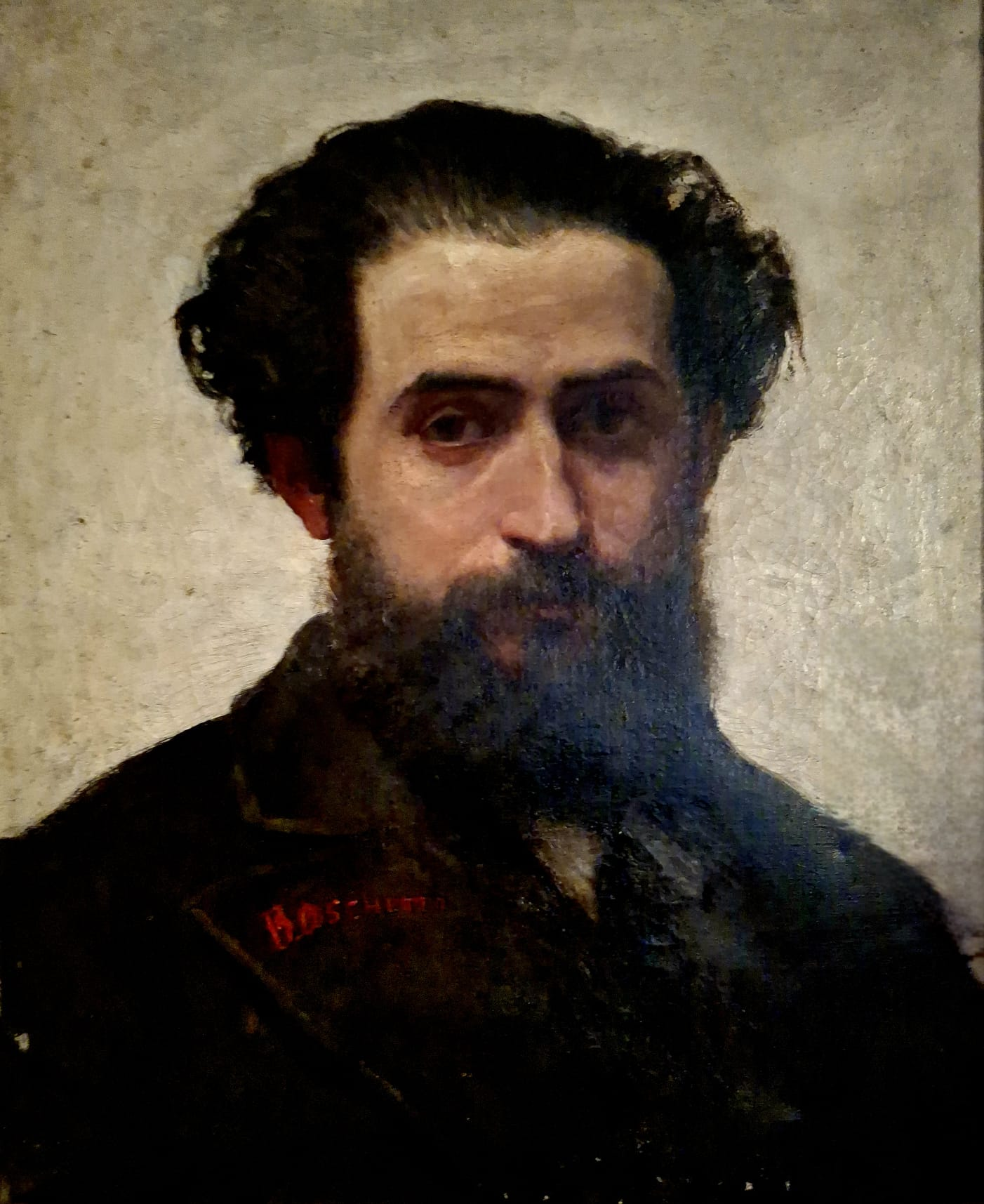
Francesco Di Bartolo portrayed by Giuseppe Boschetto, Naples, c. 1857.

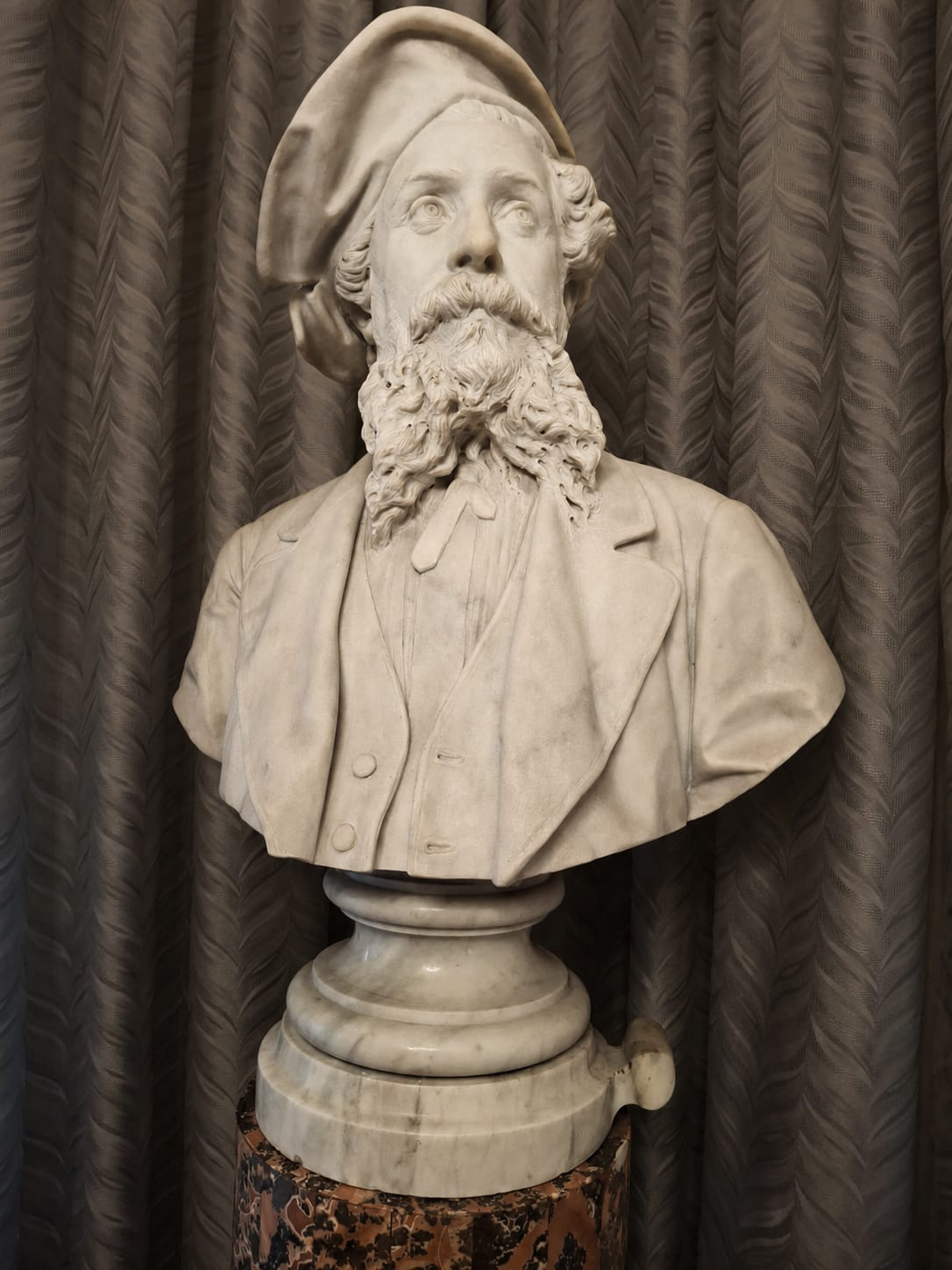
Francesco Di Bartolo portrayed by Giulio Monteverde, Rome, 1877.

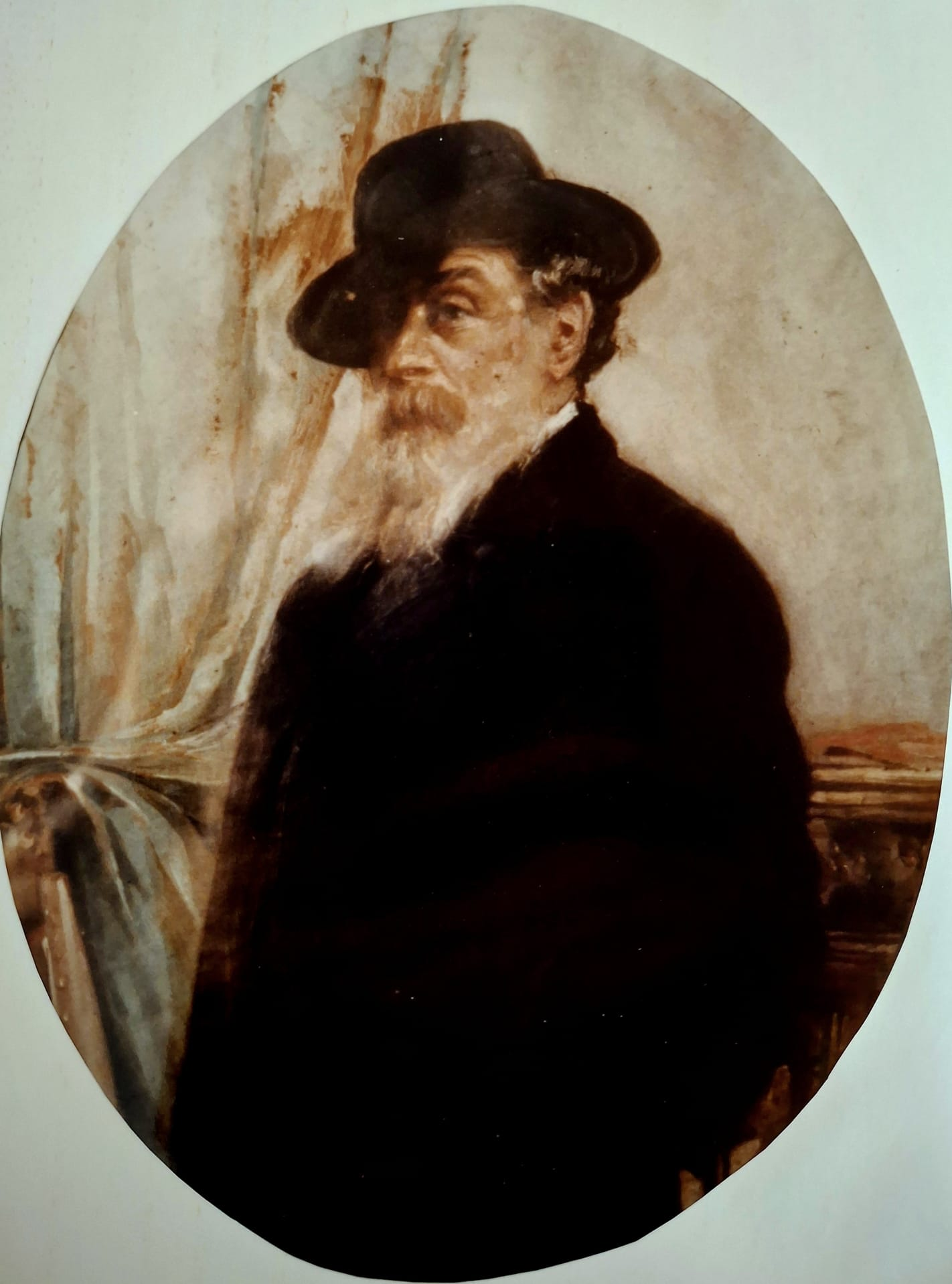
Francesco Di Bartolo portrayed by Antonino Gandolfo, sketch, Catania, c. 1890.

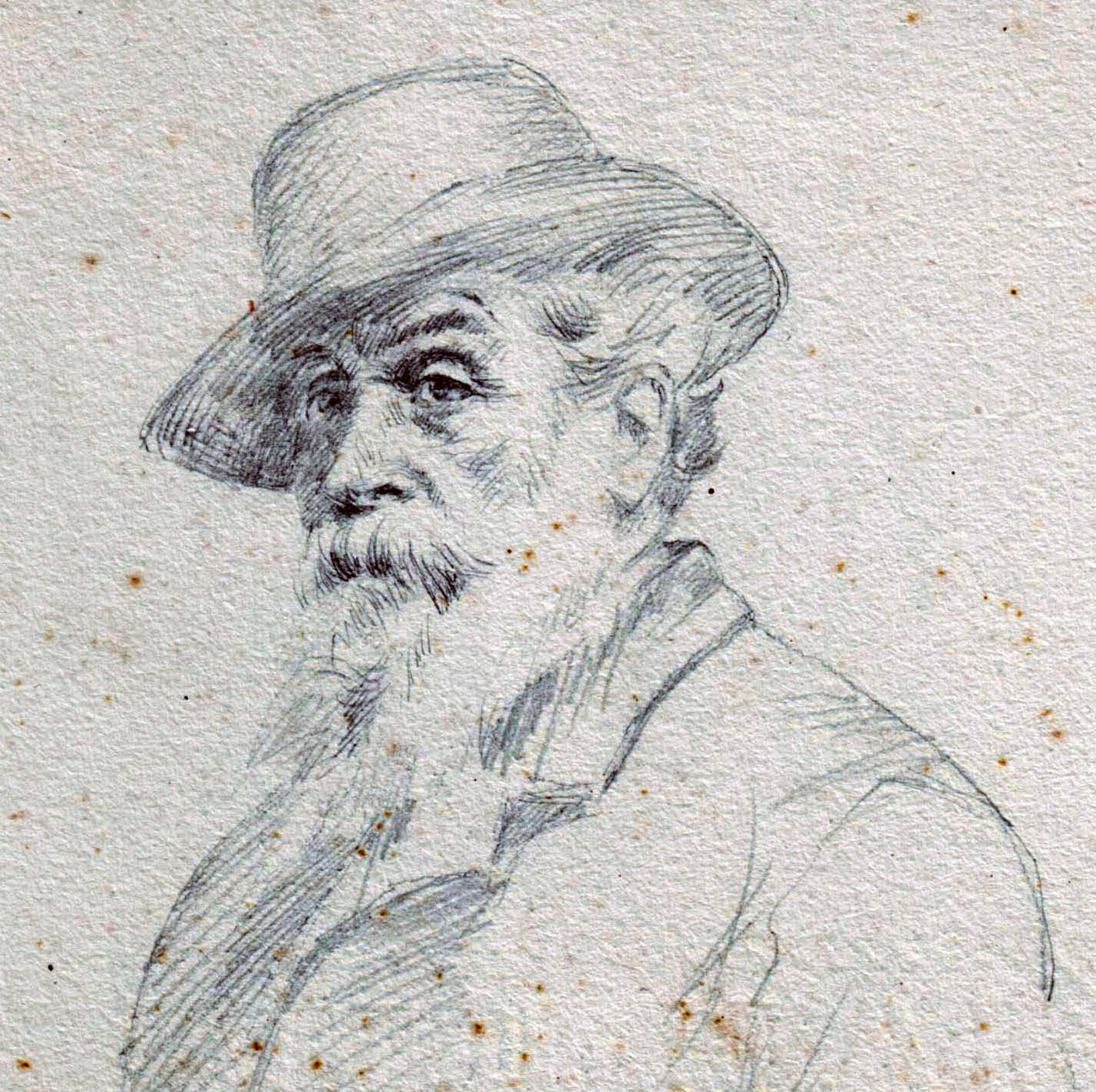
Francesco Di Bartolo portrayed by Antonino Gandolfo, Catania, c. 1890.

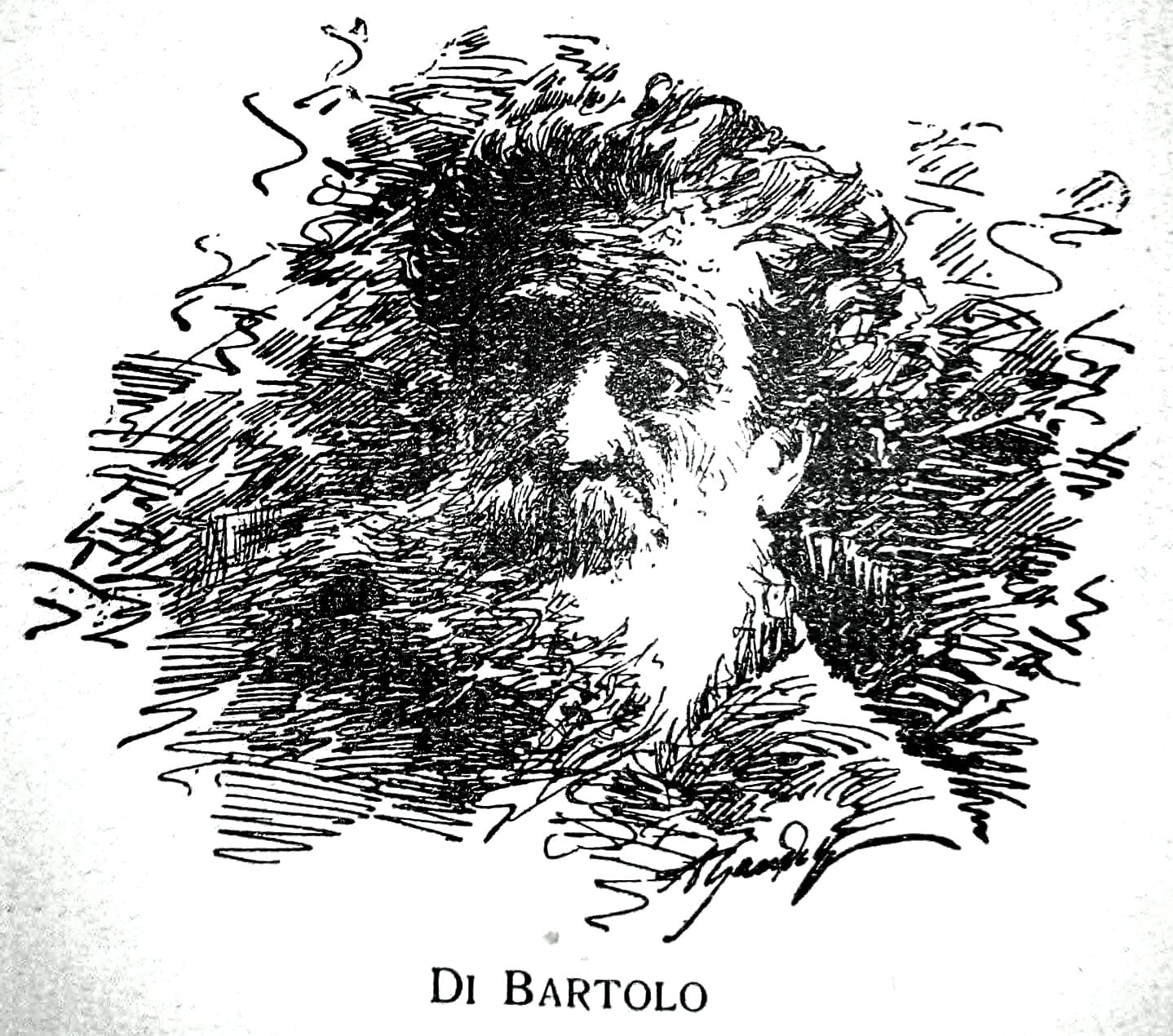
Francesco Di Bartolo portrayed by Antonino Gandolfo, sketch, Catania, c. 1890.

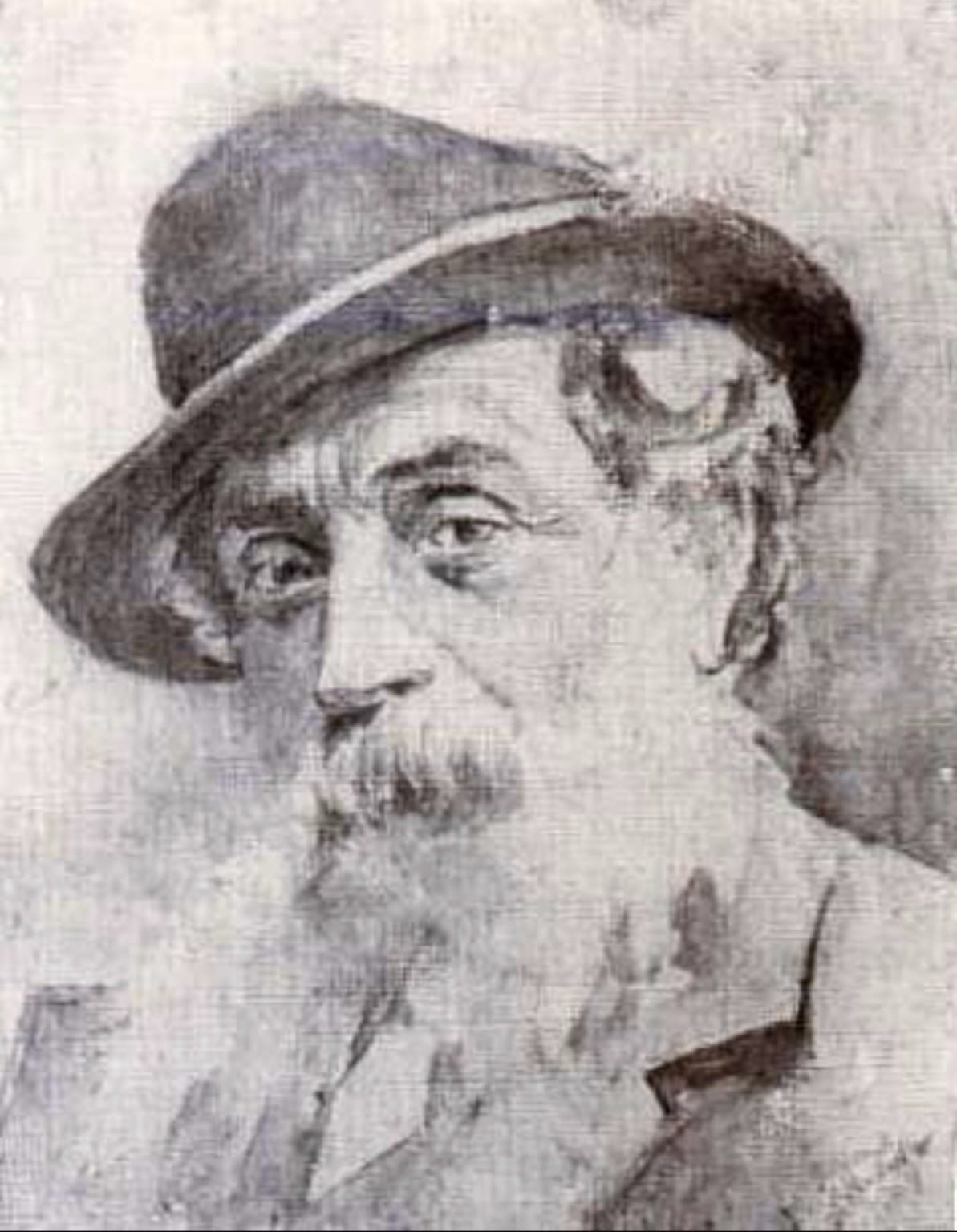
Francesco Di Bartolo portrayed by Antonino Gandolfo, oil sketch, c. 1890.

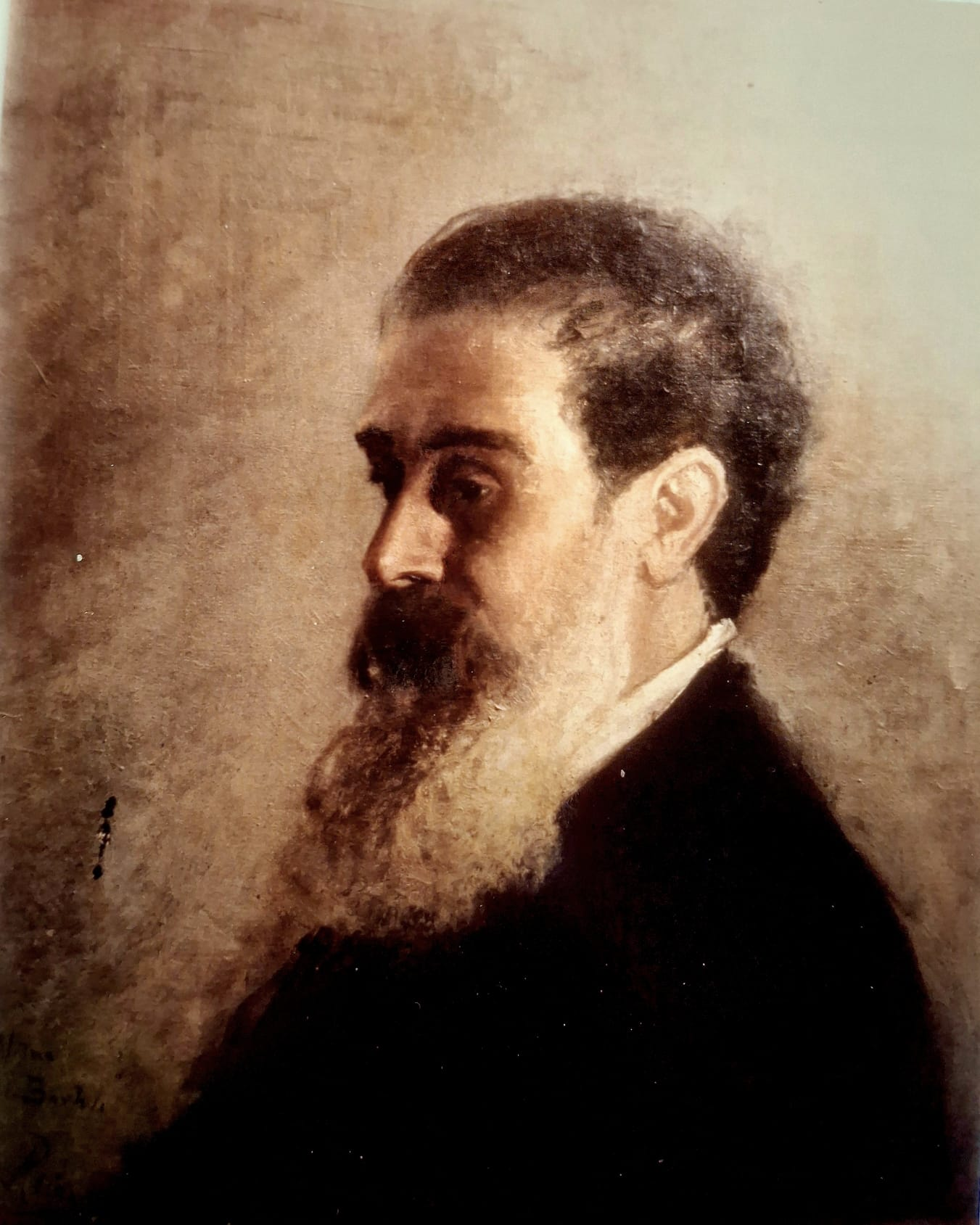
Francesco Di Bartolo portrayed by Calcedonio Reina, Catania, 1891.

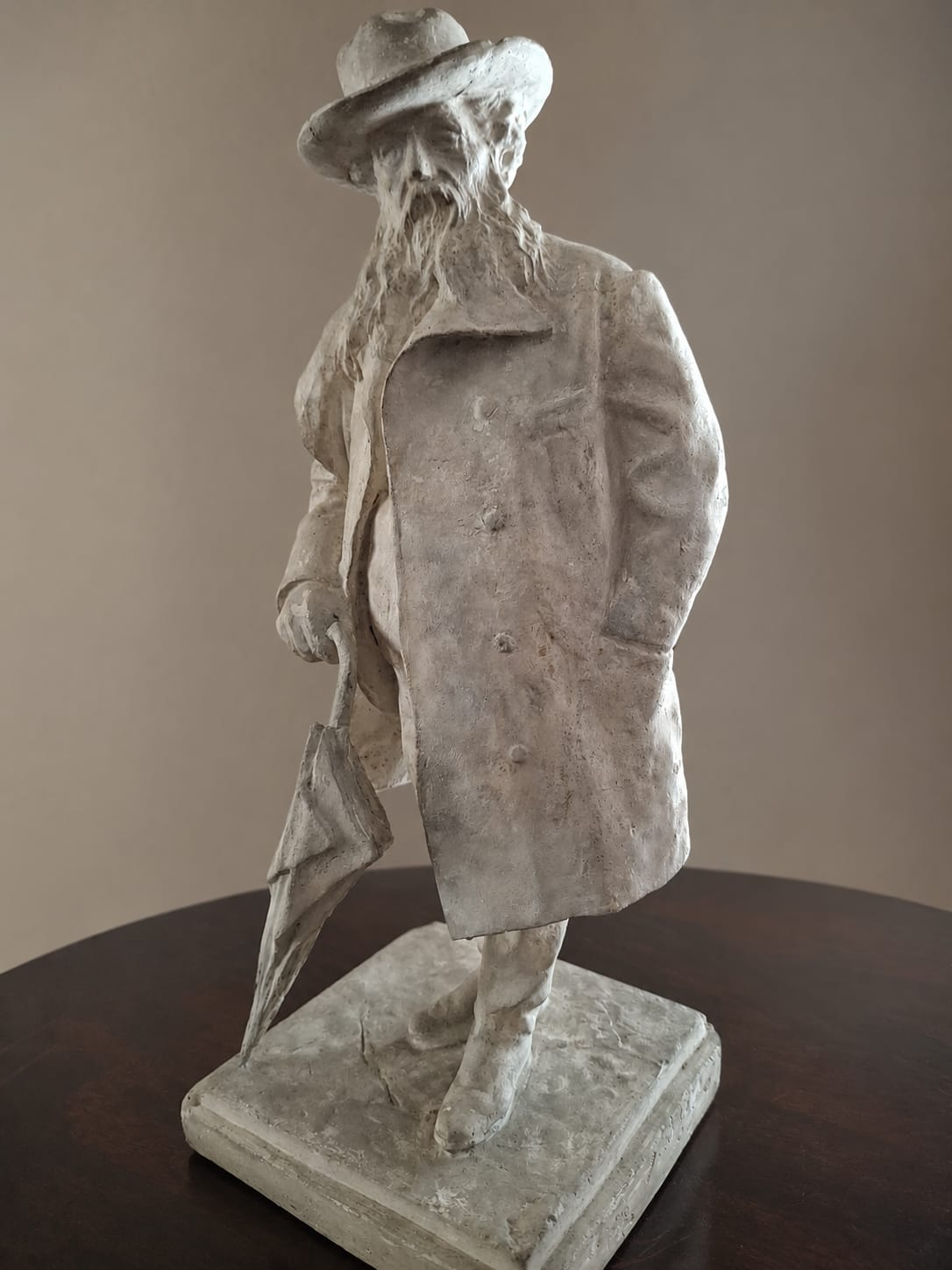
Francesco Di Bartolo portrayed by Giulio Moschetti, plaster sketch for an unrealized statue, c. 1895.

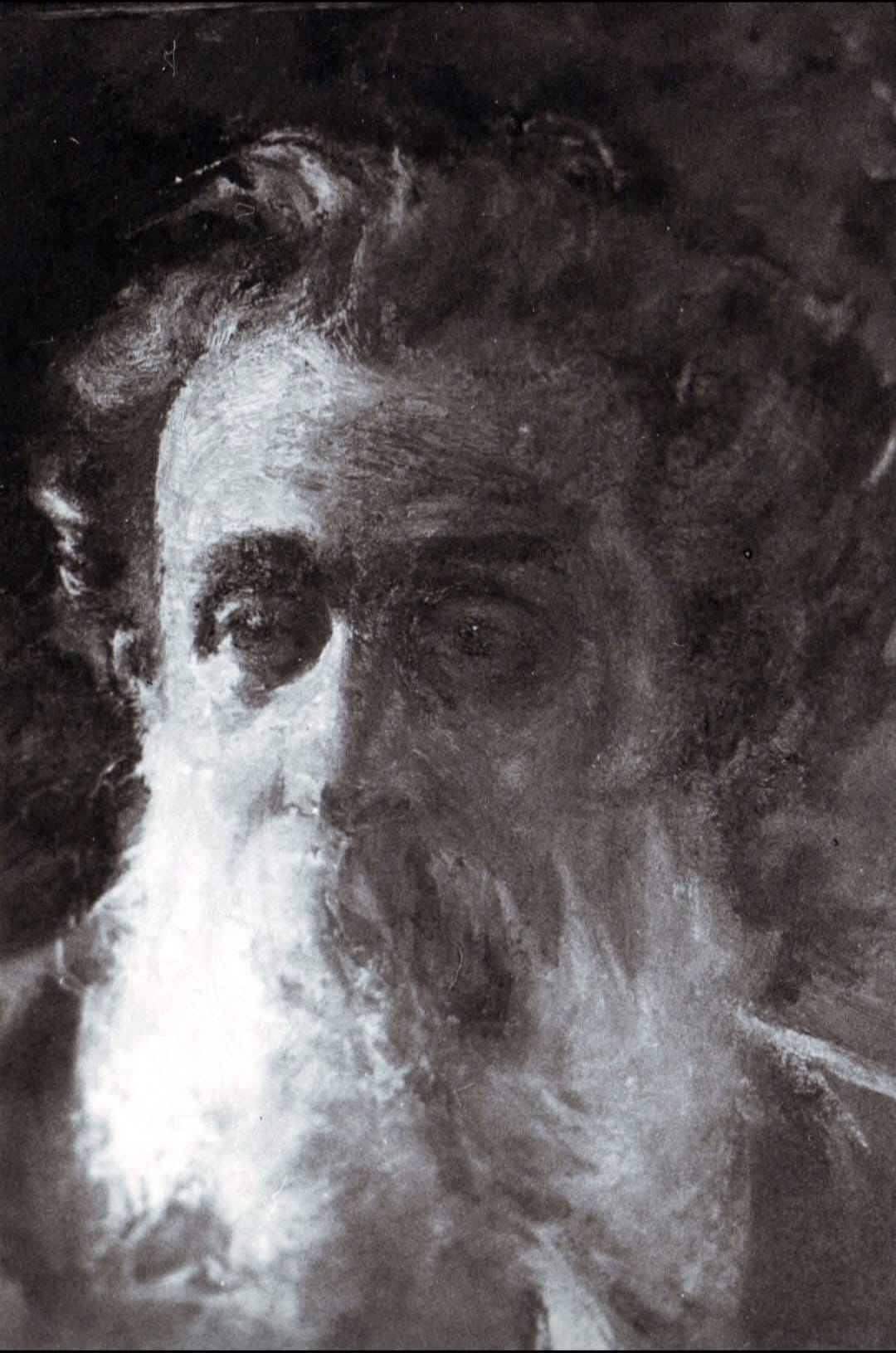
Francesco Di Bartolo portrayed by Alessandro Abate, c. 1895.

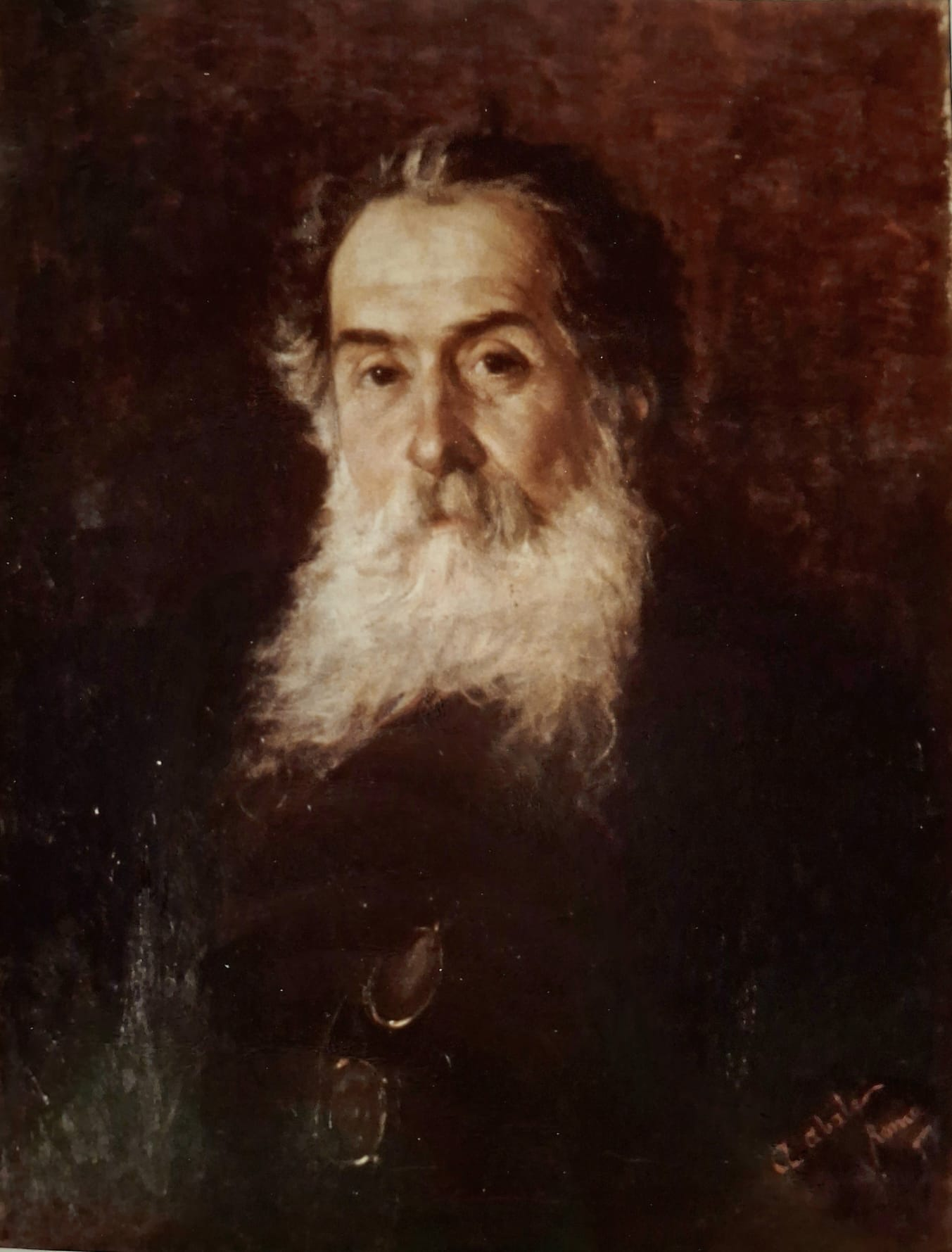
Francesco Di Bartolo portrayed by Alessandro Abate, Rome, c. 1895.

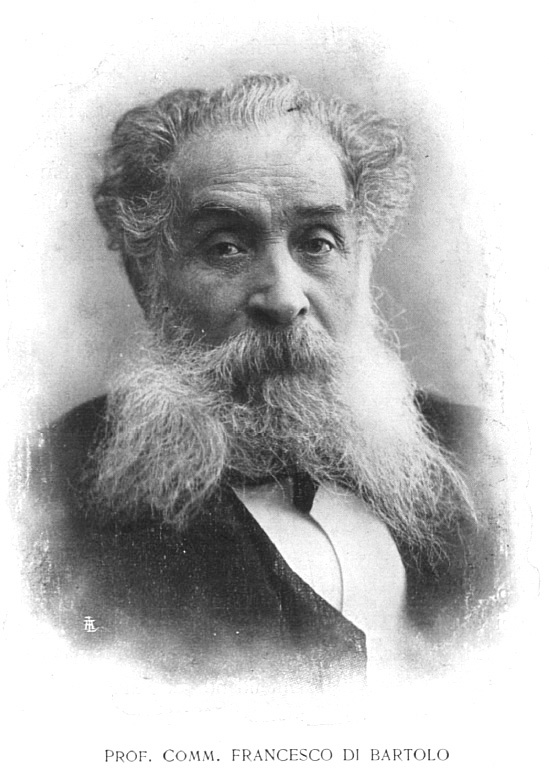
Photographic portrait of Francesco Di Bartolo, 1905.

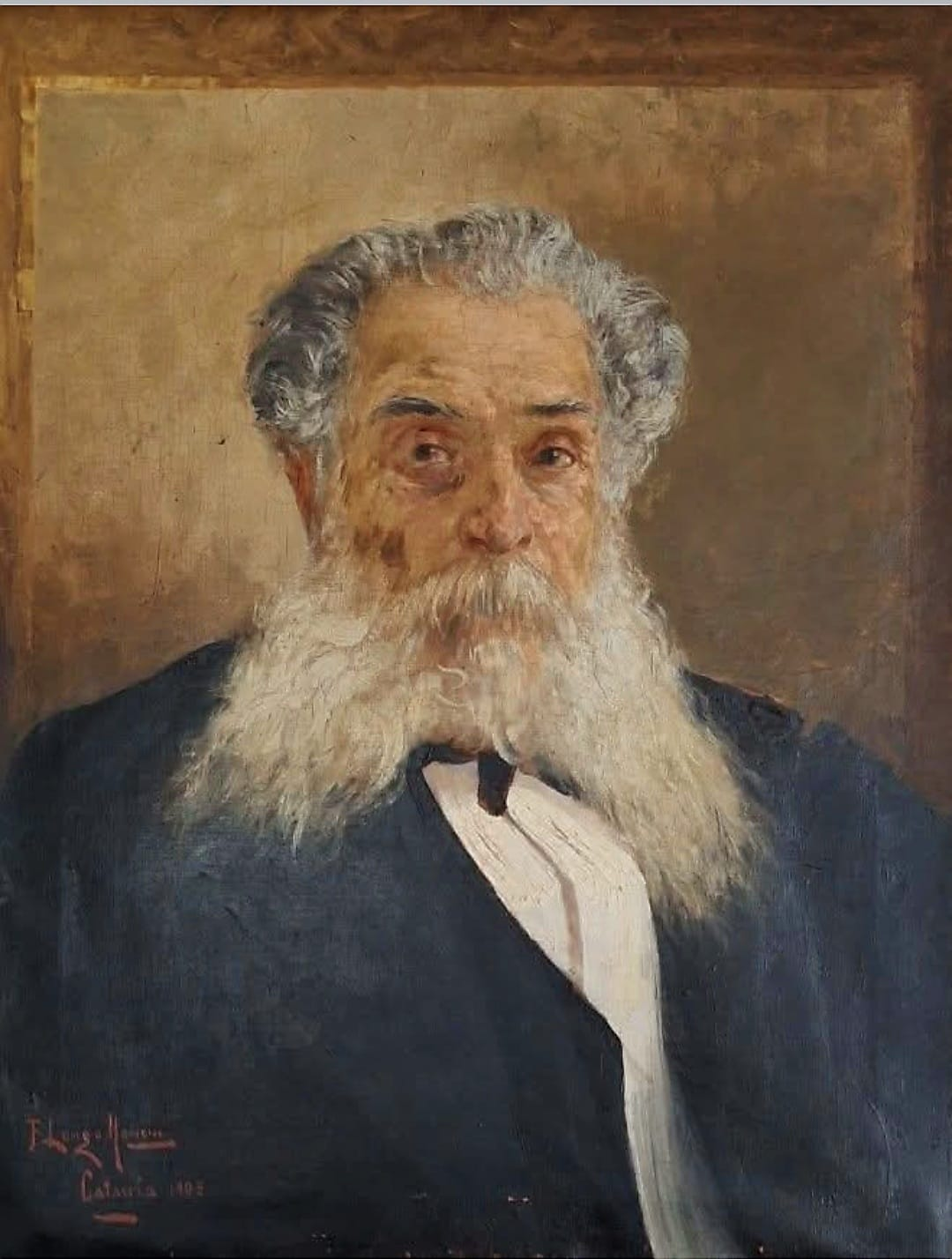
Francesco Di Bartolo portrayed by Francesco Longo Mancini, Catania, 1905.

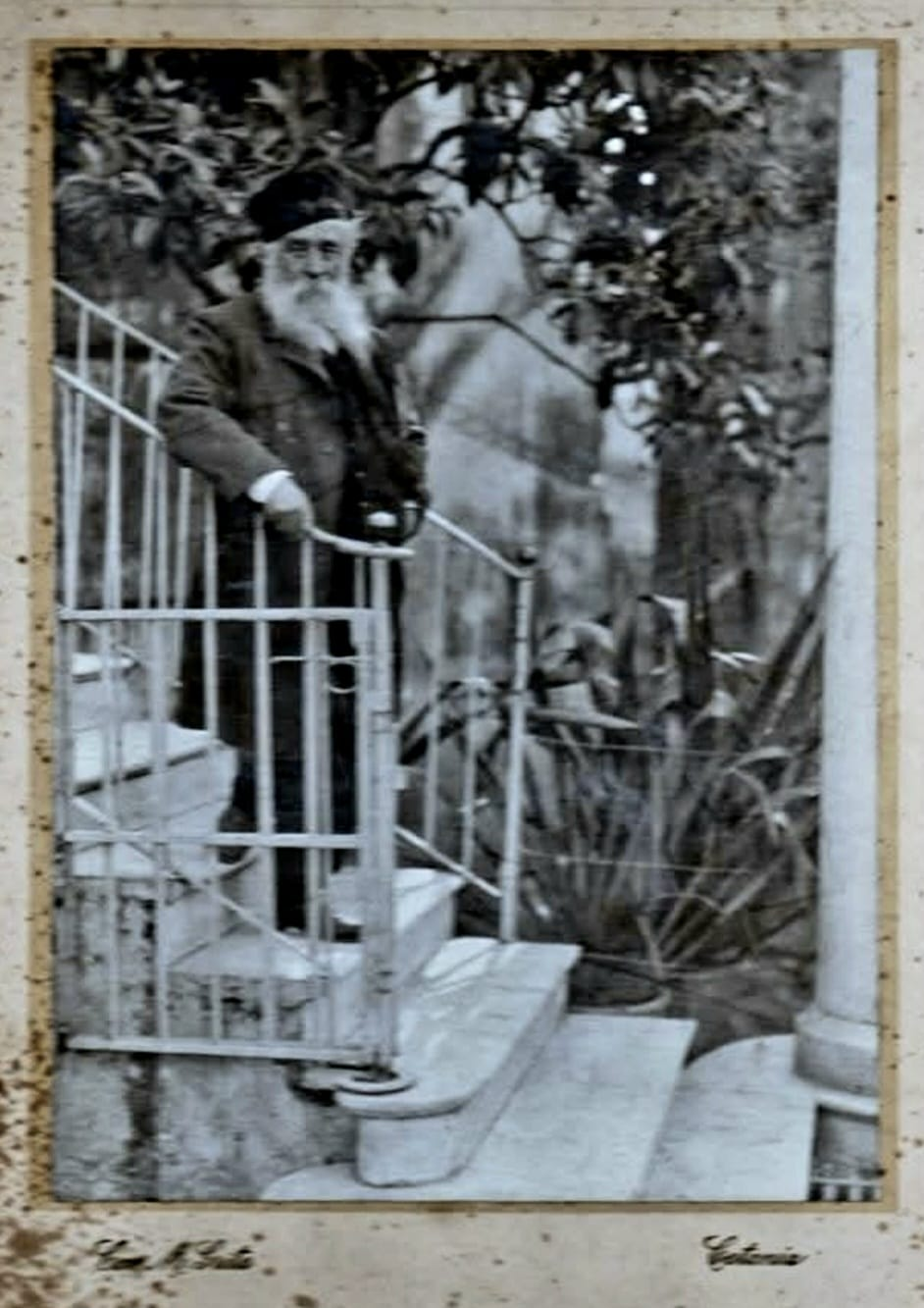
Francesco Di Bartolo, photographed by Grita on the steps of his villa in Cibali, Catania, ca. 1905.

== Selected works ==
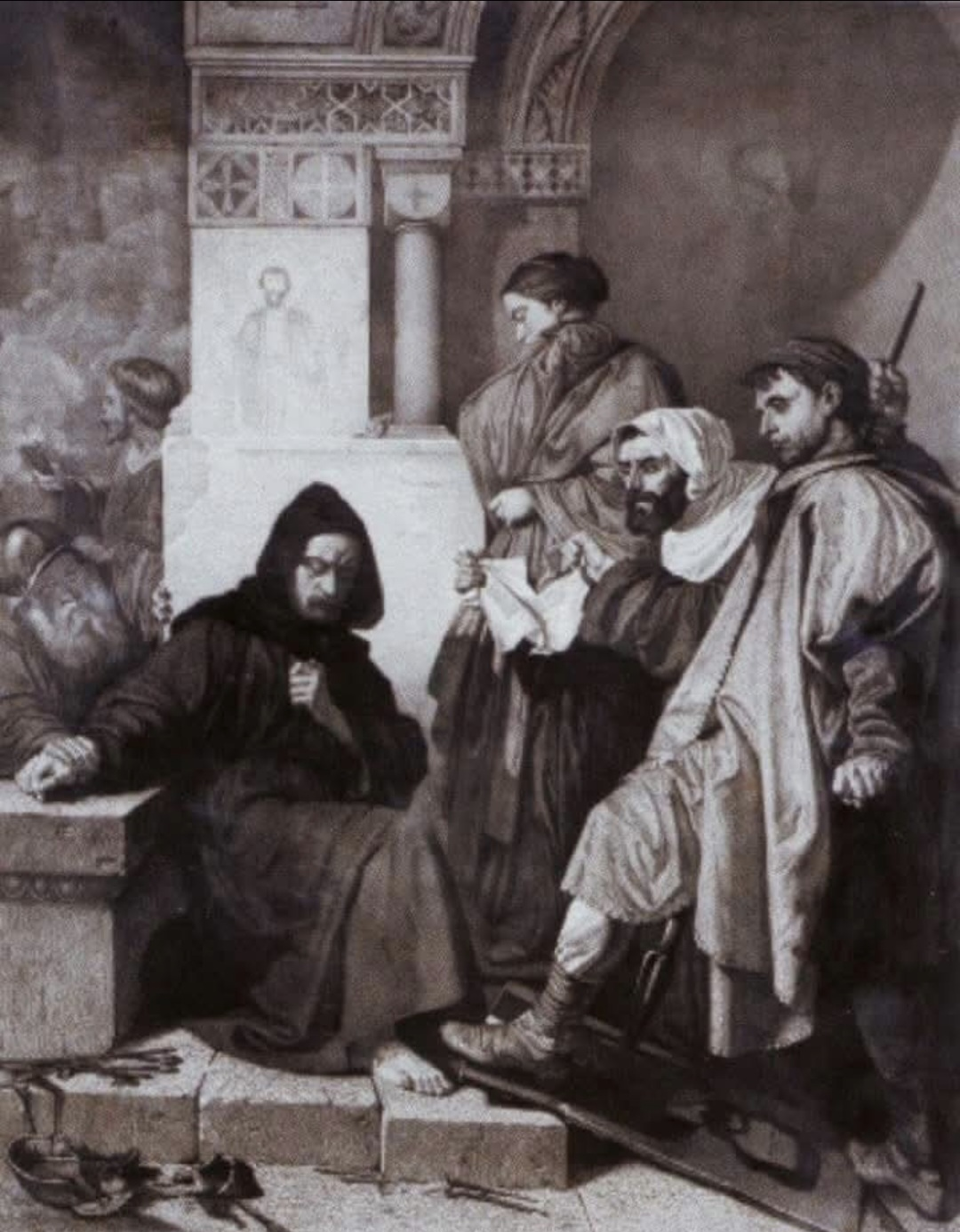
Francesco Di Bartolo, The Iconoclasts, after Domenico Morelli, 1863, etching, Natalia Di Bartolo Collection.

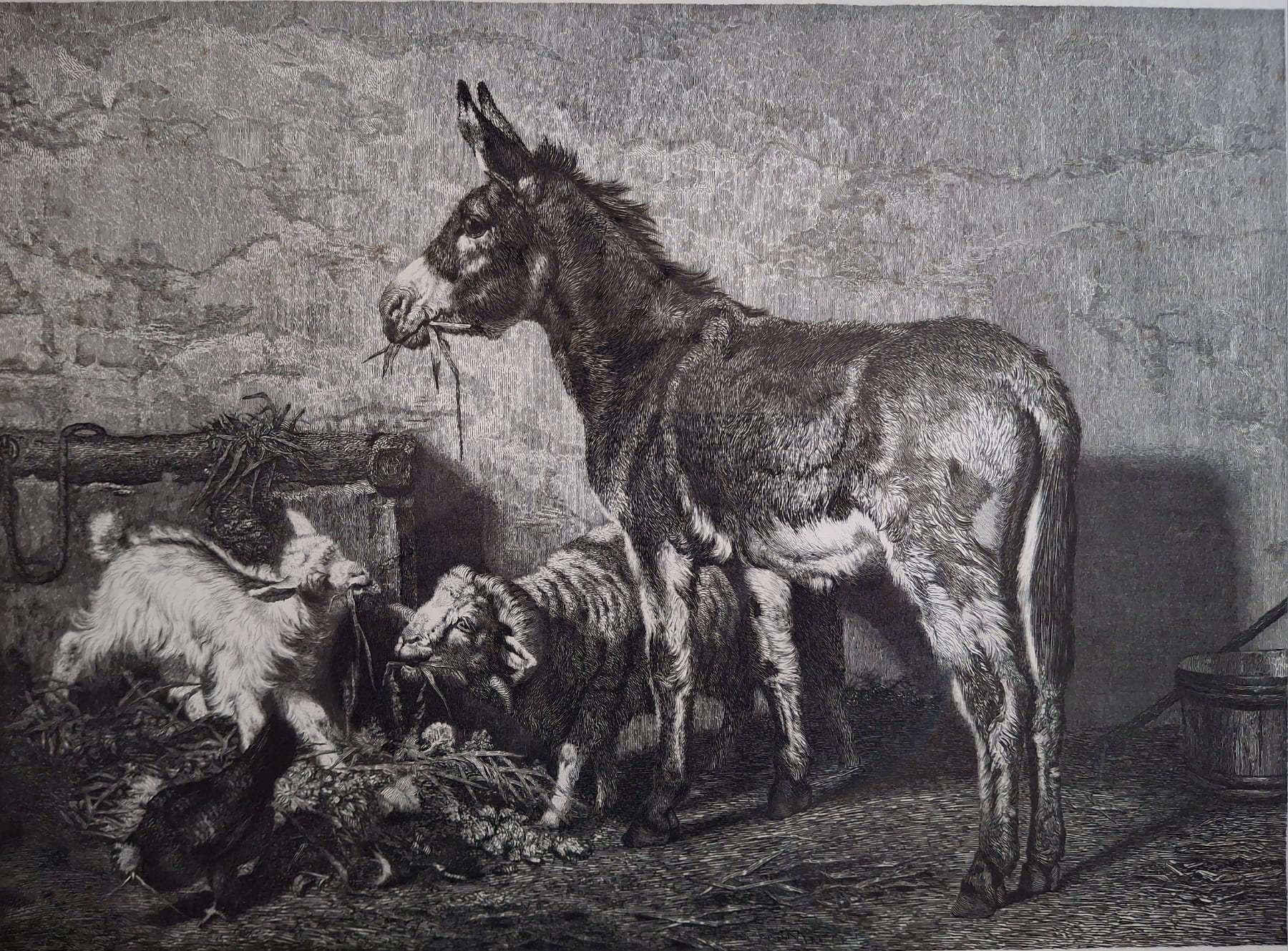
Francesco Di Bartolo, Animal subject, after Filippo Palizzi, c. 1860, etching.

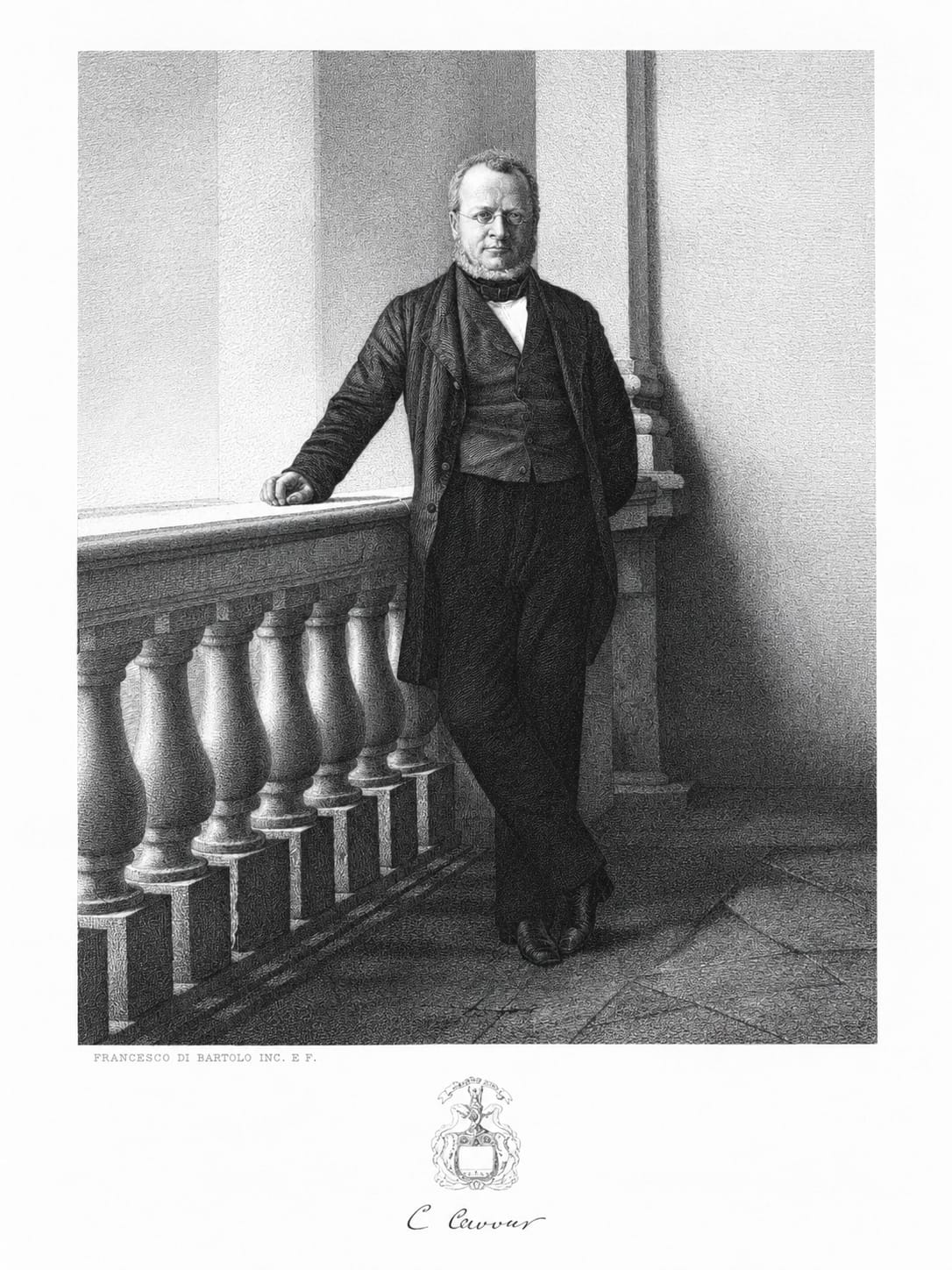
Francesco Di Bartolo, Portrait of Camillo Benso, Count of Cavour, 1872, etching, Historical Archive of the City of Turin.

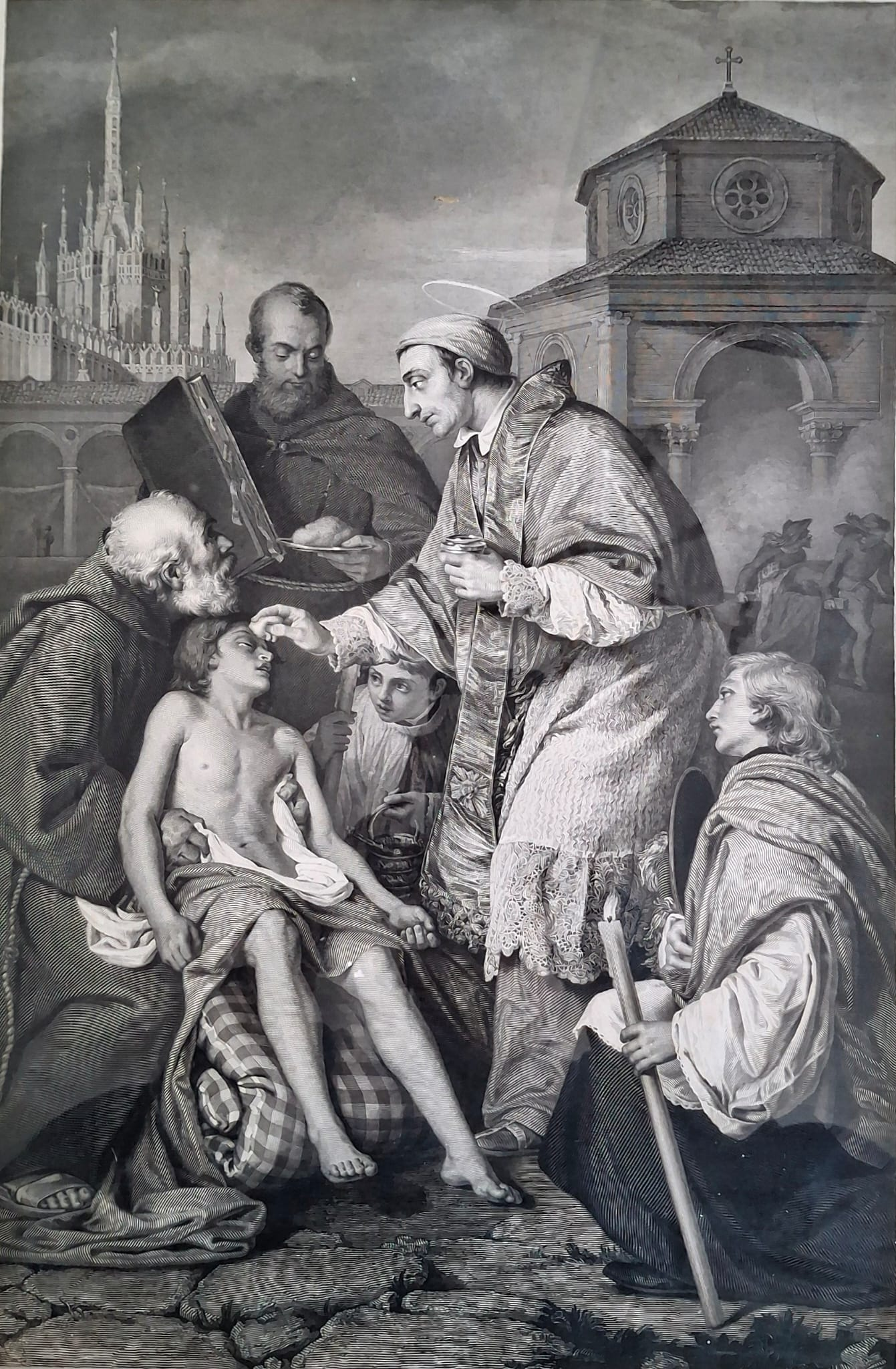
Tommaso Aloysio Juvara / Francesco Di Bartolo, San Carlo Borromeo, after Giuseppe Mancinelli, Naples, 1875, burin engraving, Natalia Di Bartolo Collection.

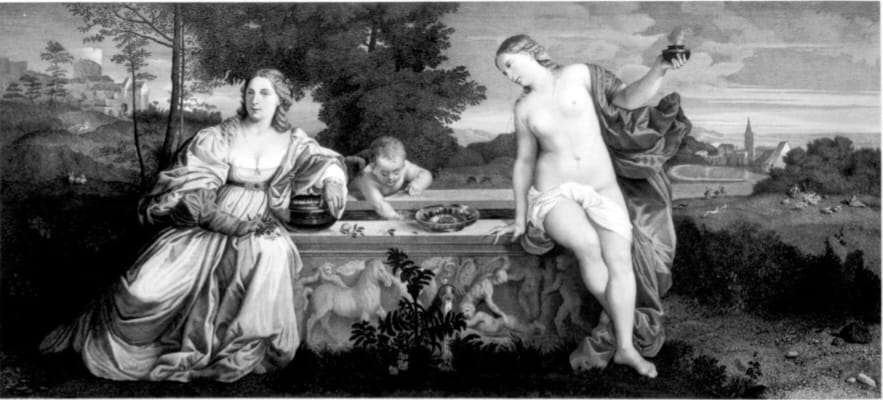
Francesco Di Bartolo, Sacred and Profane Love, after Titian, burin engraving for the Royal Calcography, 1877, Natalia Di Bartolo Collection.

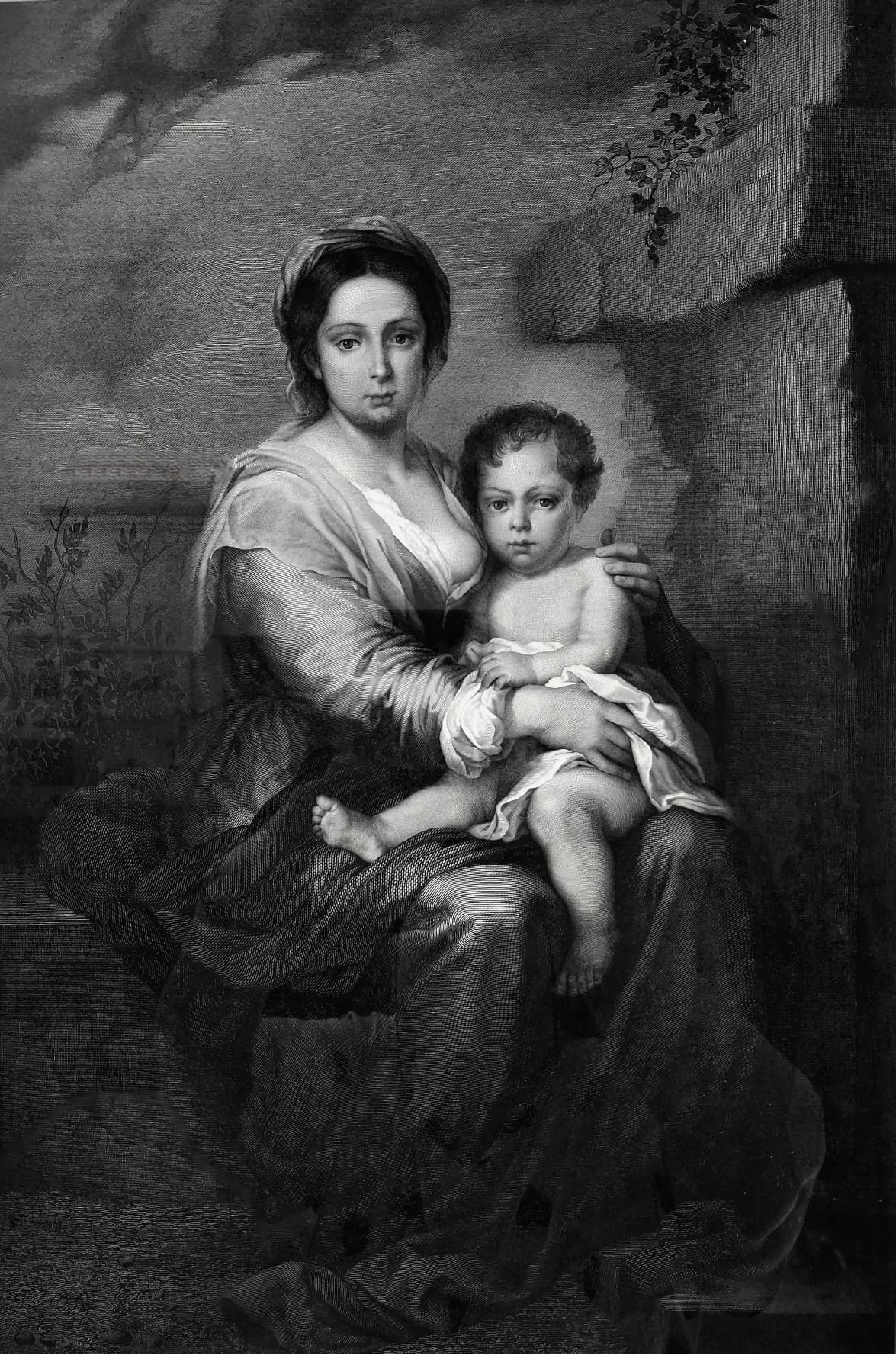
Francesco Di Bartolo, Madonna and Child, burin engraving after Bartolomé Esteban Murillo, 1882, Natalia Di Bartolo Collection.

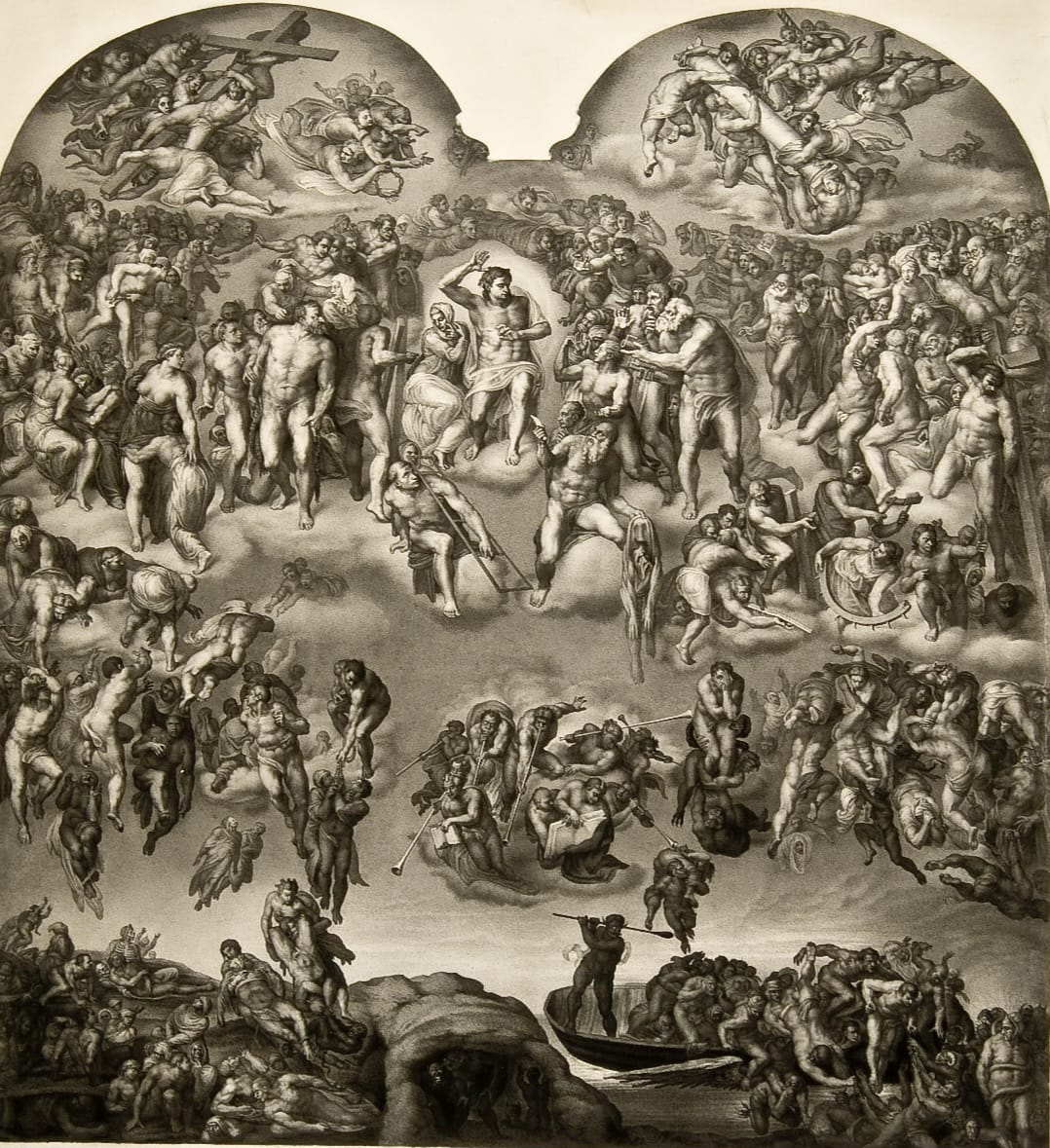
Francesco Di Bartolo, The Last Judgement after Michelangelo, 1883–1884, charcoal drawing, Istituto Centrale per la Grafica, Rome, inv. D-CL39.

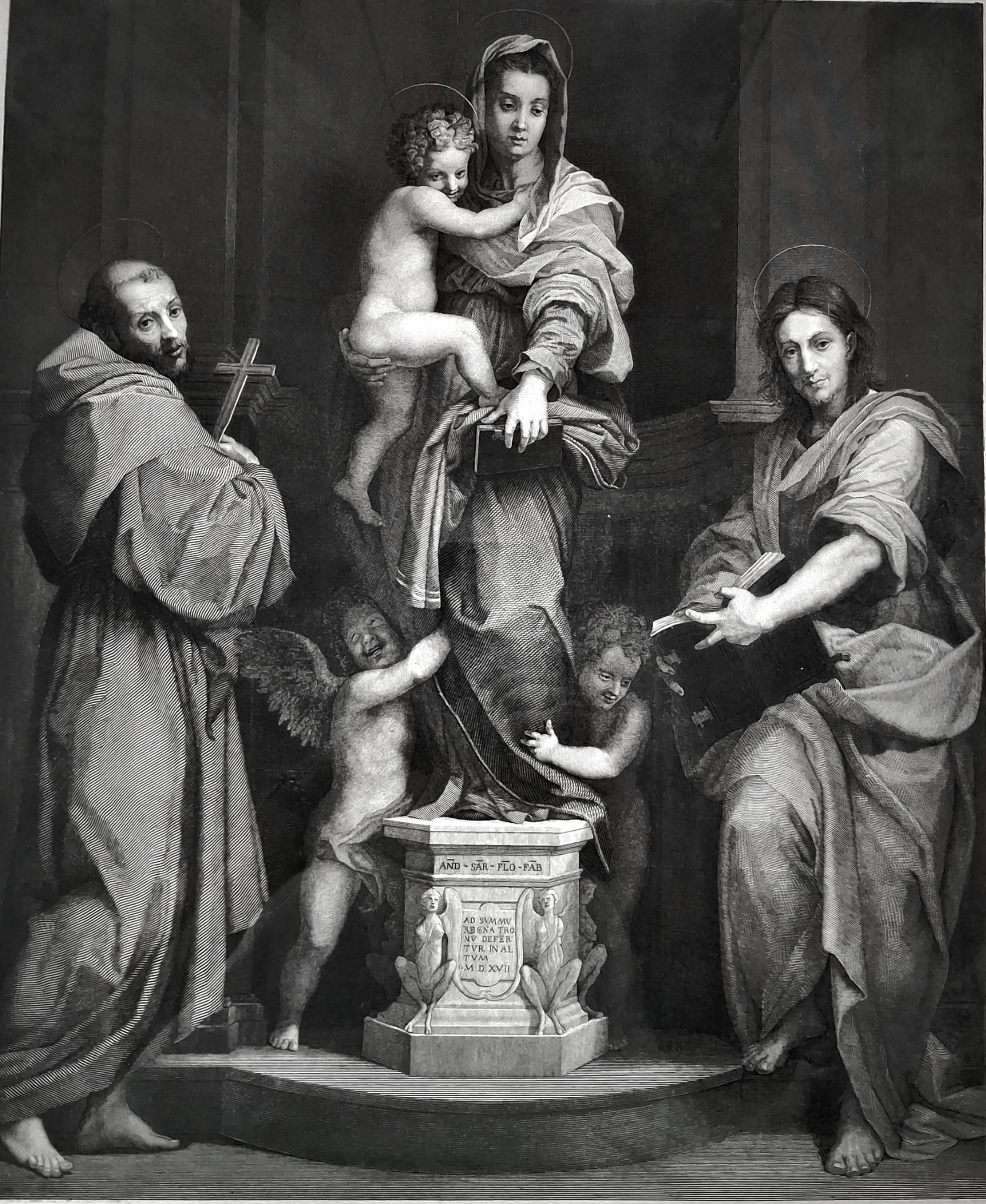
Francesco Di Bartolo, La Madonna delle Arpie, after Andrea del Sarto, burin engraving, 1889, Natalia Di Bartolo Collection.

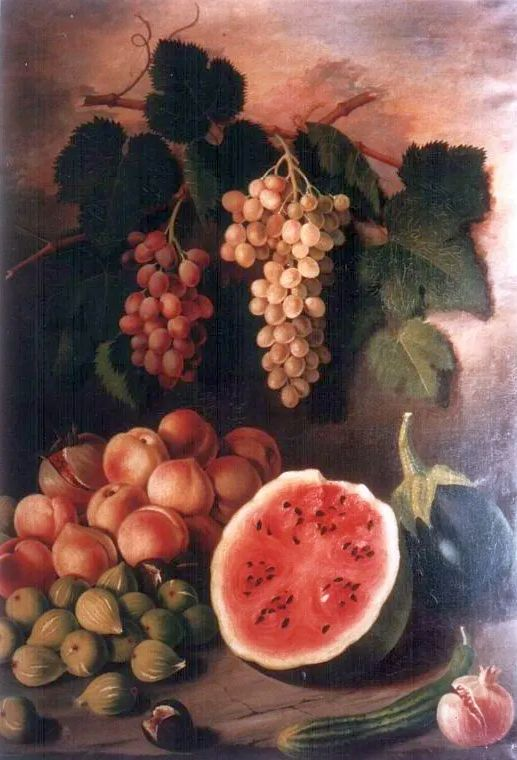
Francesco Di Bartolo, Fruit and vegetables, oil on canvas, c. 1880, Natalia Di Bartolo Collection.

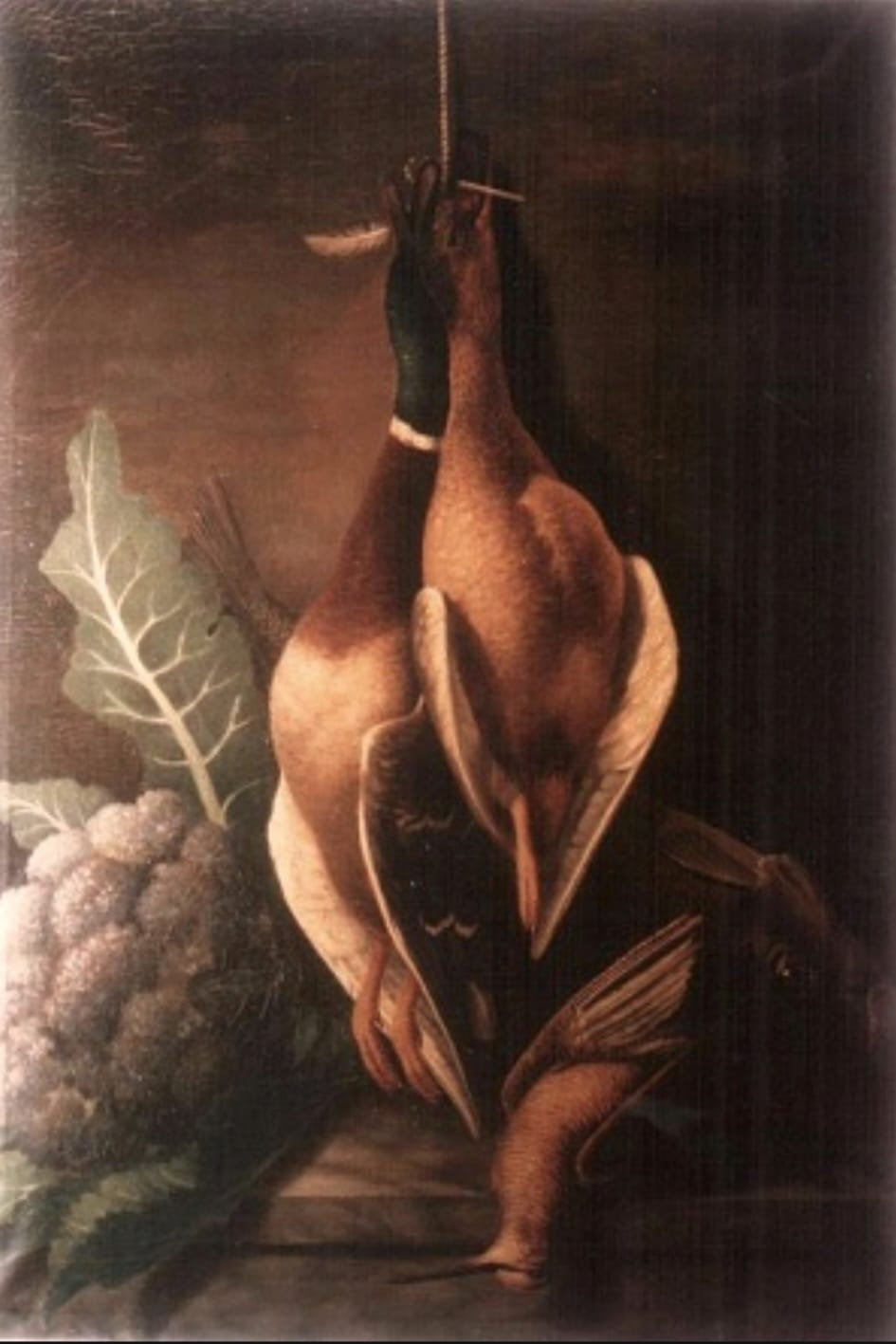
Francesco Di Bartolo, Game and Vegetables, oil on canvas, c. 1880, Natalia Di Bartolo Collection.

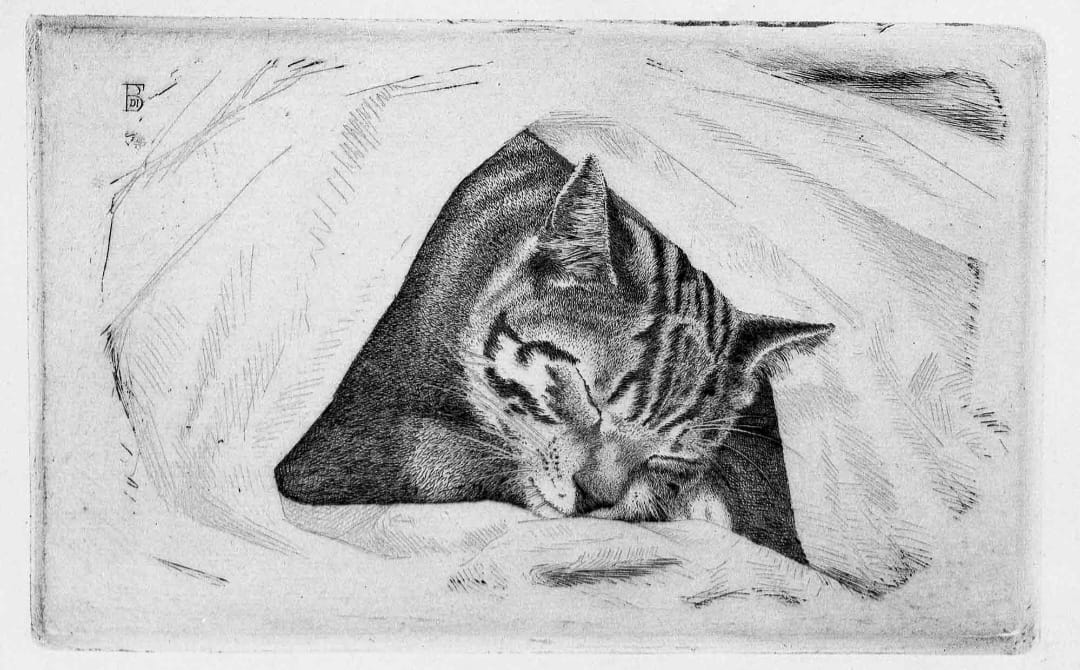
Francesco Di Bartolo, Cat, etching, 1870 ca., Private Collection.

Partial list:

- Saint Agatha, after Francesco Guarino, drawing and burin engraving.
- The Legend of the Sirens, after Edoardo Dalbono, etching.
- Various animal subjects, after Filippo Palizzi, etchings.
- Cat's head, original etching.
- A peasant girl seen from behind, etching.
- San Carlo Borromeo, after Giuseppe Mancinelli, burin engraving signed together with his master Juvara.
- The Iconoclasts, after Domenico Morelli, etching.
- The Venetians at the announcement of the Peace of Villafranca, after Nicola Parisi, etching.
- H. M. Victor Emmanuel II, etching.
- Official portrait of Camillo Benso, Count of Cavour, full-length figure, etching.
- Sacred and Profane Love, after Titian, burin engraving.
- Madonna and Child, after Murillo, burin engraving.
- The Last Judgement after Michelangelo, charcoal drawing, 1883–1884.
- Madonna of the Harpies, after Andrea del Sarto, burin engraving.
- Queen Margherita of Savoy, etching.
- Portraits of Tommaso Aloysio Juvara, Ussi, Altamura, Palizzi, Eleuterio Pagliano, Domenico Morelli, Monteverde, Dupré, Correnti, Salvatore Majorana Calatabiano, Dusmet and many others, all etchings with burin retouching.
- Fully finished drawings, including Michelangelo's Last Judgement.
- Paintings: Neapolitan landscapes and numerous still lifes.

== Honours ==
Ribbon	Honour
	Knight of the Order of Saints Maurice and Lazarus
	Knight of the Civil Order of Savoy
	Knight of the Order of the Crown of Italy
	Officer of the Order of the Crown of Italy
	Commander of the Order of the Crown of Italy
	Grand Officer of the Order of the Crown of Italy

== Bibliography ==
- Natalia Di Bartolo, Corpus fondante e Corpus di saggi per il Bicentenario della nascita di Francesco Di Bartolo 1826–2026.
- Ugo Matini (1889). Angelo De Gubernatis (ed.). Dizionario degli artisti italiani viventi, pittori, scultori e architetti. Florence: Tipi dei successori Le Monnier.
- Enrico Giannelli (1916). Artisti napoletani viventi: pittori, scultori ed architetti: opere da loro esposte, vendute e premii ottenuti in esposizioni nazionali ed internazionali. Naples: Tipografia Melfi & Joele. pp. 567–569.
- N. S. Belyaev (2018). Honorary Free Associates of the Imperial Academy of Arts. Brief biographical guide. Saint Petersburg: Russian Academy of Sciences.
