= Castello Ursino =

13th-century castle in Sicily, Italy

Ursino Castle
- Castello Ursino
- Catania, Sicily, Italy
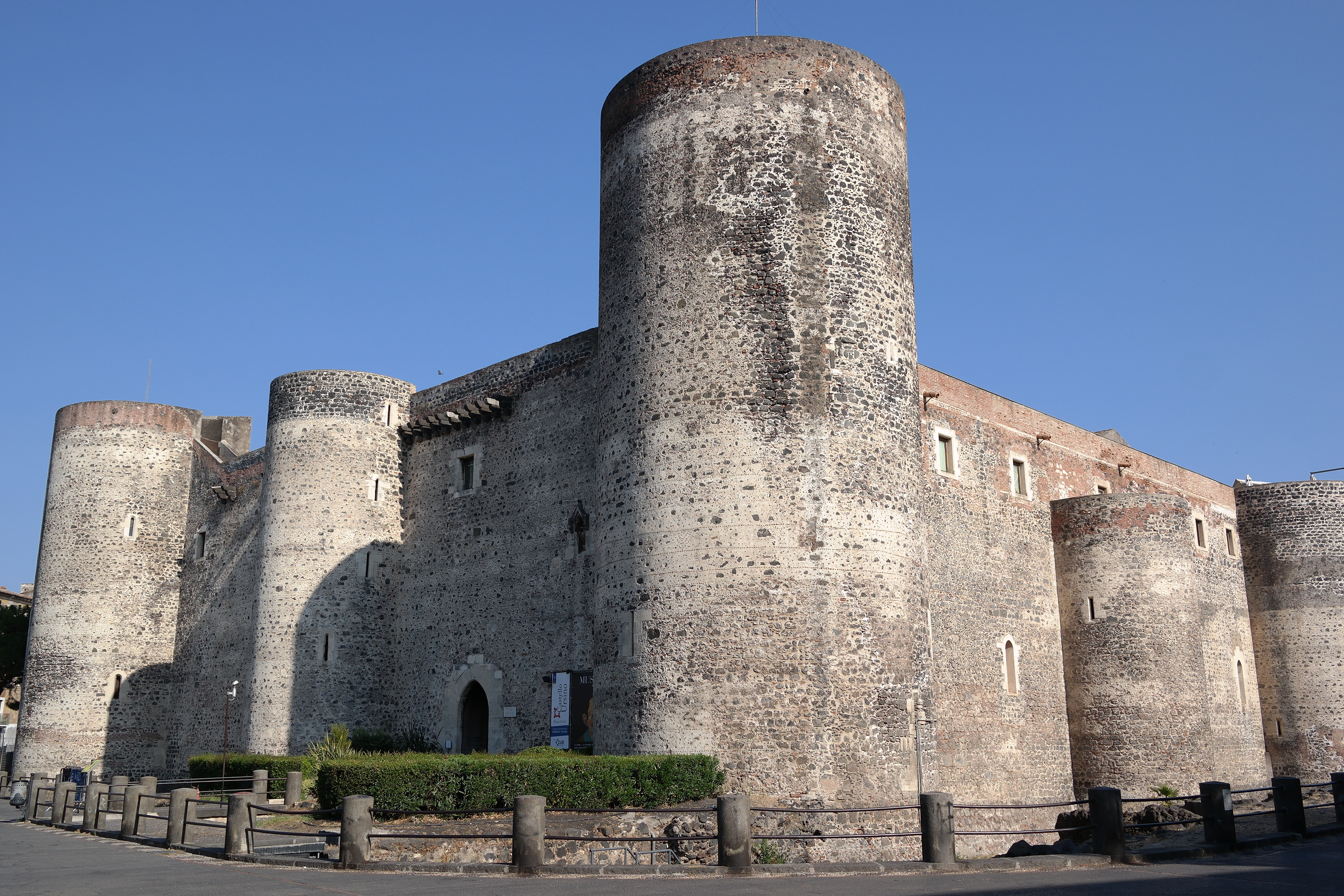
- View of the castle

Site information
- Type: Castle
- Open to the public: No
- Condition: Intact

Location
- Plan of the castle's first floor
- Coordinates: 37°29′56″N 15°5′5″E

Site history
- Built: 1239–1250
- In use: 13th–19th centuries
- Events: Sicilian Vespers

Castello Ursino (Sicilian: Casteddu Ursinu, lit. 'Bear Castle'), also known as Castello Svevo di Catania, is a castle in Catania, Sicily, southern Italy. It was built in the 13th century as a royal castle of the Kingdom of Sicily, and is mostly known for its role in the Sicilian Vespers, when it became the seat of the Sicilian Parliament. The castle is in good condition today, and it is open to the public as a museum.

== History ==
=== Construction ===
Castello Ursino was built between 1239 and 1250, as one of the royal castles of Emperor Frederick II, King of Sicily, closing a chapter on the turbulent time in Sicily that followed the death of his predecessor, William II. Local lords had attempted to assert independence, and in 1220 Frederick II had ordered the destruction of all non-royal castles in Sicily. Castello Ursino was built to stress royal power as well as for the defence of the capital, and was considered impregnable at the time.

=== Sicilian Vespers ===
In 1295, during the Sicilian Vespers, the Parliament which declared deposed James II of Aragon as King of Sicily, replacing him with Frederick III, was held here. The following year it was captured by Robert of Anjou but was later again in Aragonese hands.

=== Royal seat ===
King Frederick III resided in the castle, as well as his successors Peter II, Louis, Frederick IV and Maria. Here the latter was kidnapped by Guglielmo Raimondo III Moncada to avoid her marriage with Gian Galeazzo Visconti (1392). King Martin I held also his court in the castle.

=== Decline ===
After the move of the capital away from Catania and the appearance of powder weapons, the castle lost its military role and was used as a prison. It is one of the few buildings in Catania to have survived the earthquake of 1693.

When the castle was first built, it was on a cliff looking out to sea, however as the result of volcanic eruptions, and earthquakes, it is now a kilometre inland. The former moat too in the 17th century was filled with lava from an eruption by Mount Etna. Its present location, surrounded by streets and shops in a typical Catania piazza, may strike some visitors as unusual.

=== Present day ===
The castle was acquired by the city of Catania in 1932, and it was restored. The Museo Civico opened in the restored castle on 20 October 1934. Today, the museum houses artifacts and artwork from the castle as well as the greater geographical area. These items date from the Classical era onward, representing the diverse influences throughout Sicilian history. Frequently, the castle hosts also temporary exhibitions or artistic events (theatrical representations and concerts). It is also possible to use the historical site to celebrate a civil union.

Further restoration work was carried out in November 2009.

== Layout ==
The castle has a rectangular plan, with a large circular tower at each corner and an open-air inner court. The wall on the east side features a pentagram made of black lava stone.

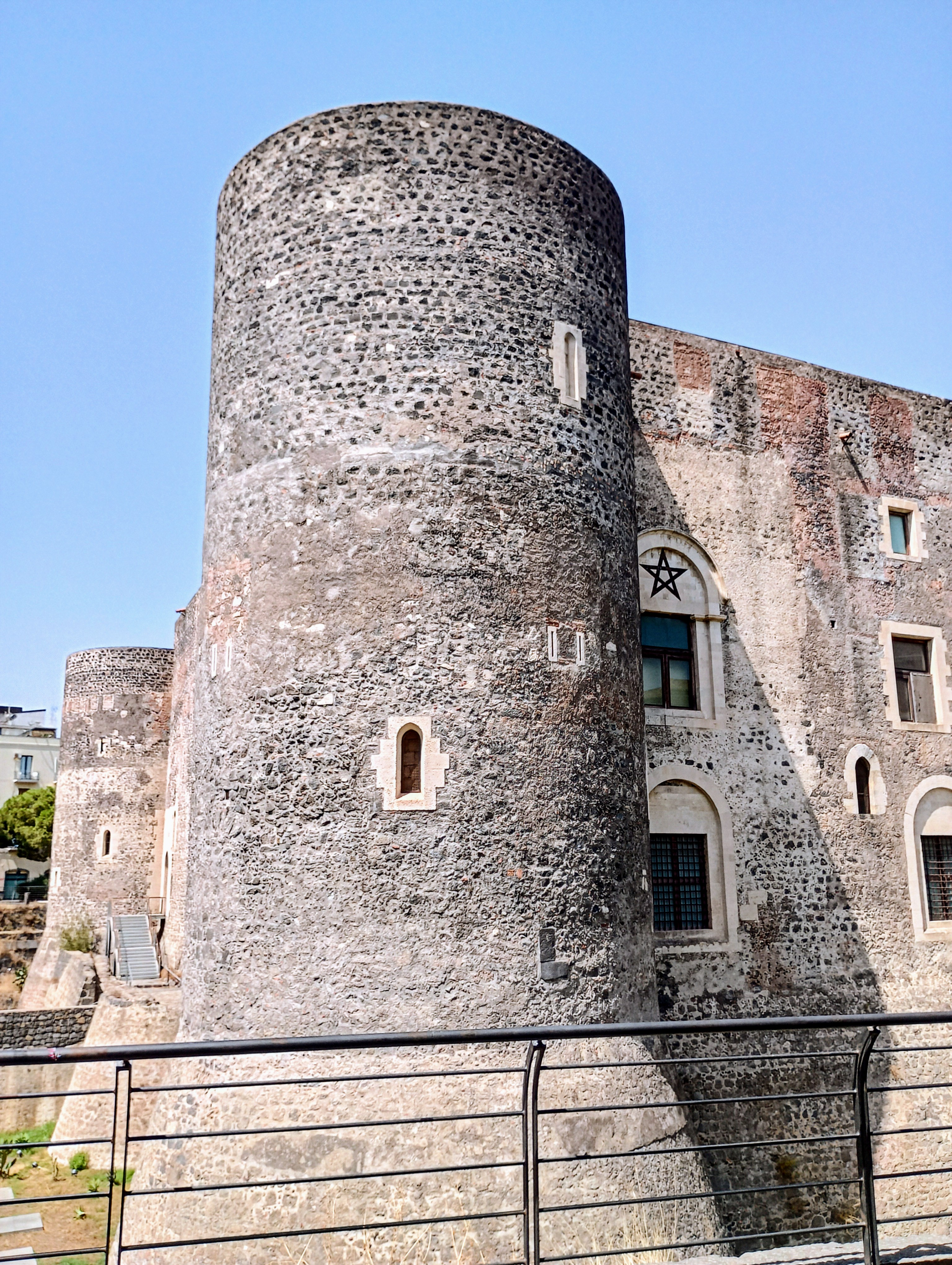
Section of the castle displaying the pentagram design

== Museum layout ==
=== Ground floor ===
==== Salone d'Armi ====
This houses the museum's ticket office as well as Jewish inscriptions and inscriptions from the medieval senate-house where the decision was taken to expel the city's Jewish population in 1492, including a copy of the Julia Fiorentina inscription from the Louvre. It also houses a medieval keystone, a 16th-century cannon, parts of an ancient Roman mosaic showing the months, a 16th-century inscription mentioning a castellan from Toledo and a statue of Ignazio Paternò Castello Principe di Biscari, by Antonio Calì, displayed with a copy of his book Viaggio per le Antichità della Sicilia.

The room is, however, named after its large collection of weapons.

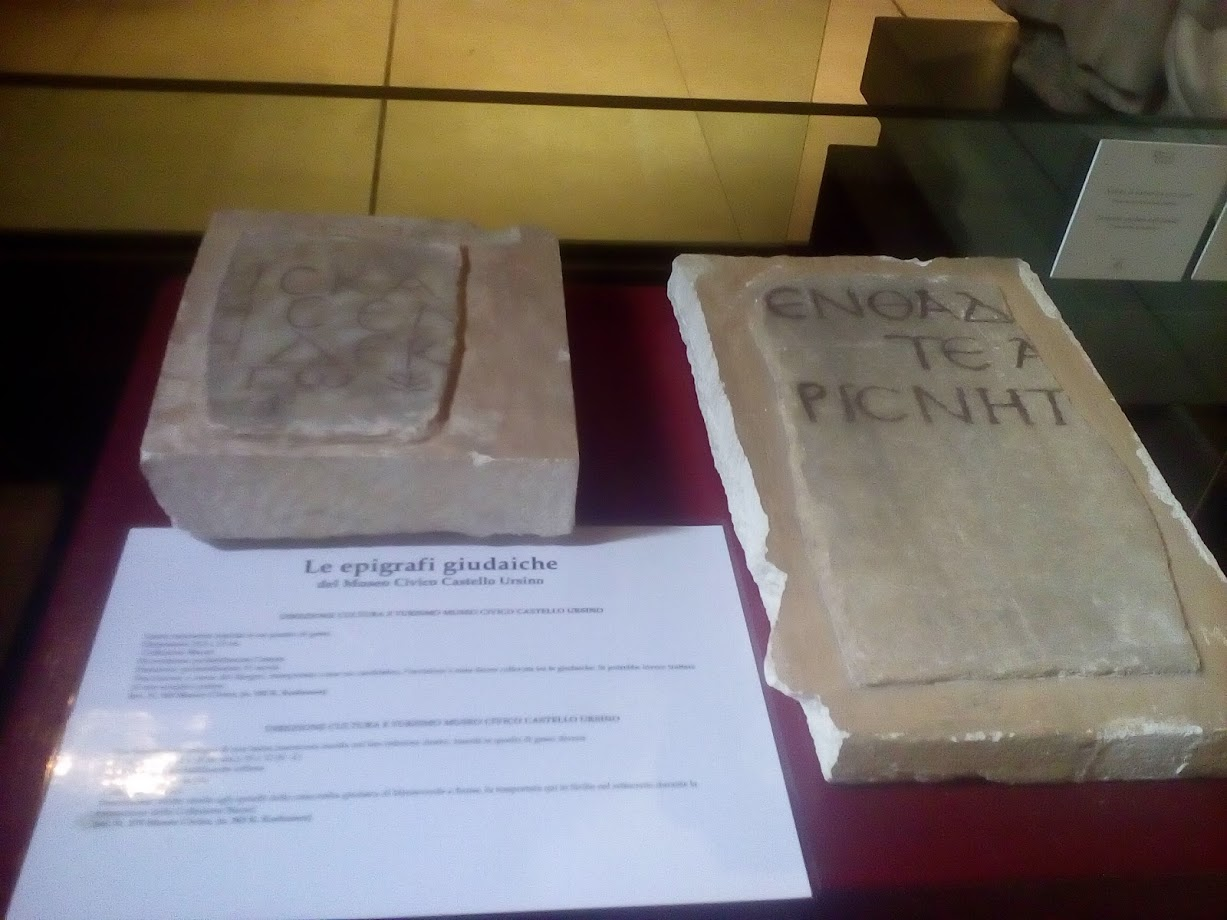
Jewish inscriptions

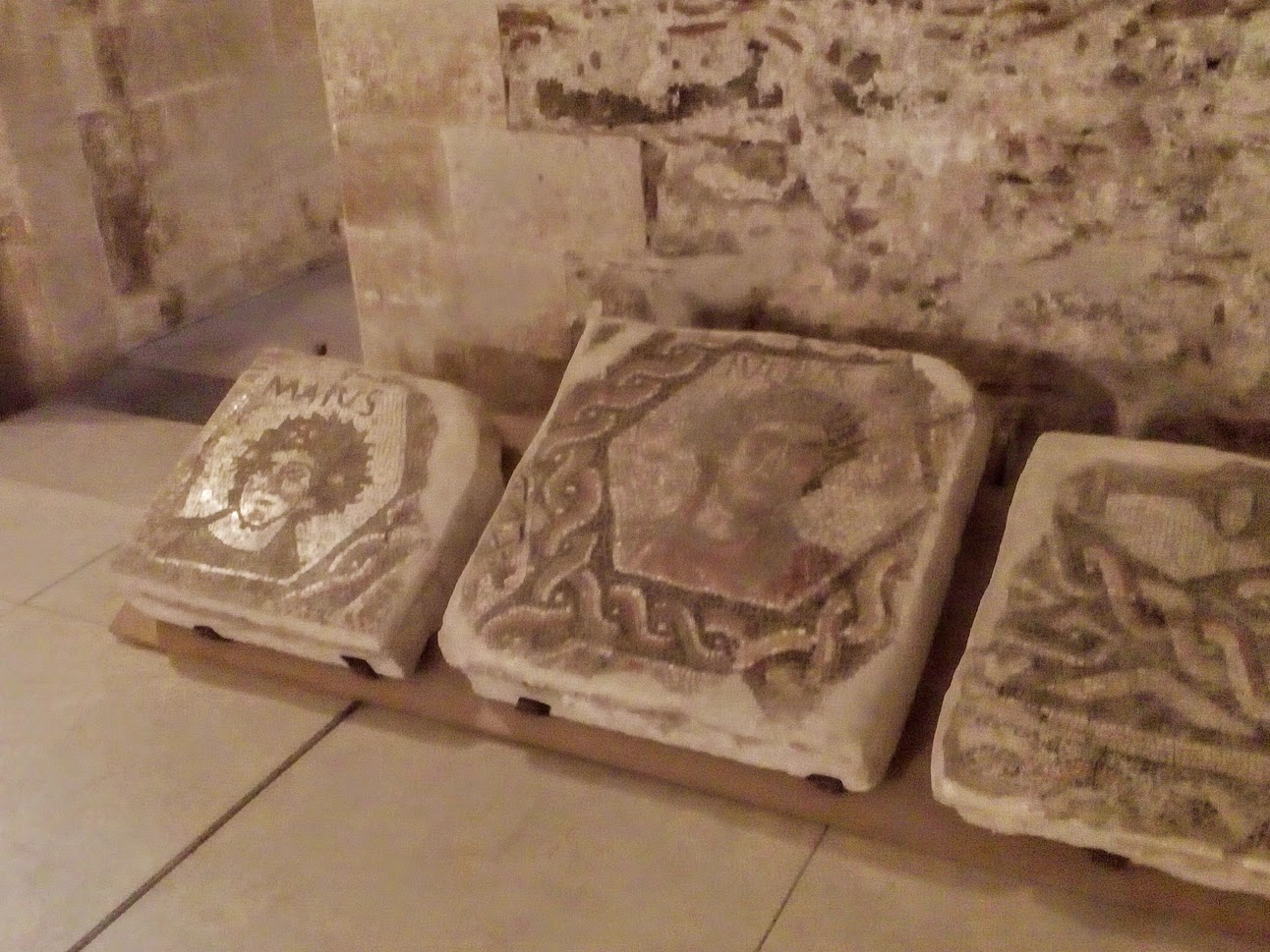
Mosaic

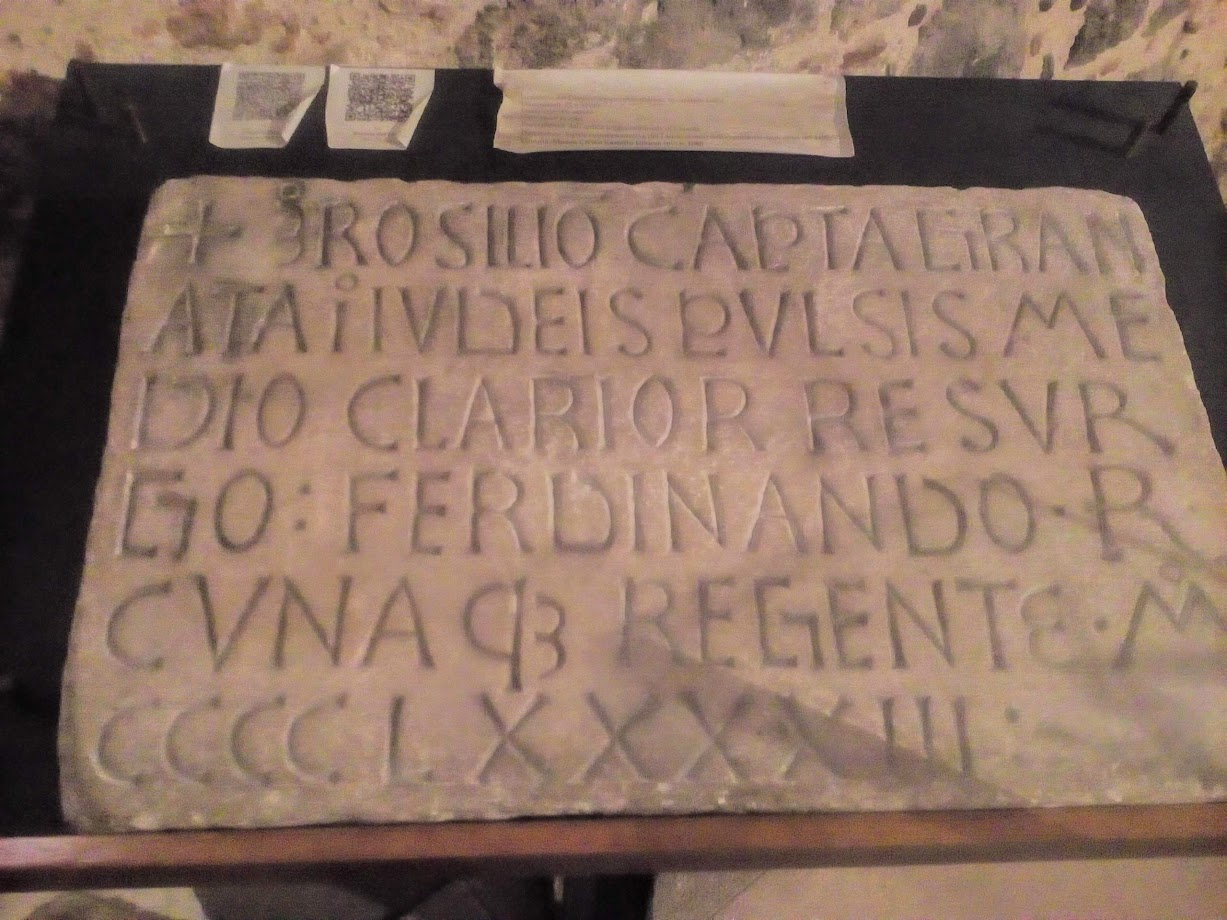
Inscription on the expulsion of the Jews in 1492

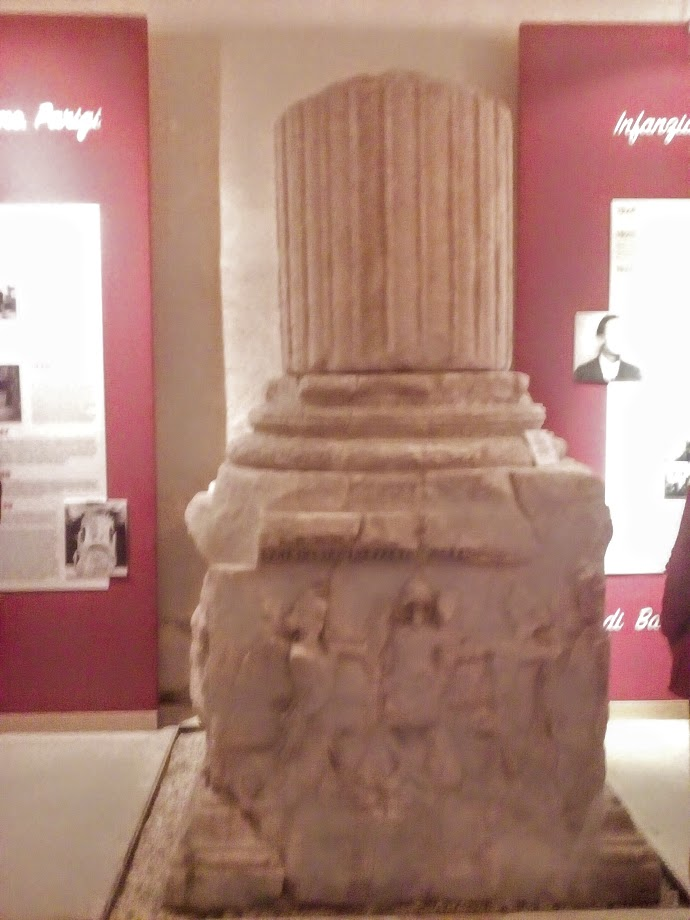
Roman plinth

==== North Connecting Hall ====
This room and those following it display finds from the city's Roman theatre, including a huge headless statue, a torso of Hermes and a plinth found by Biscari in 1770 showing a trophy crowned by two Victories and two barbarian prisoners on its sides.

==== Torre delle Bandiere ====
This houses fragments of Roman mosaic, statue of Hercules and a plaster copy of Costanza d'Aragona's sarcophagus.

==== Salone delle scuderie ====
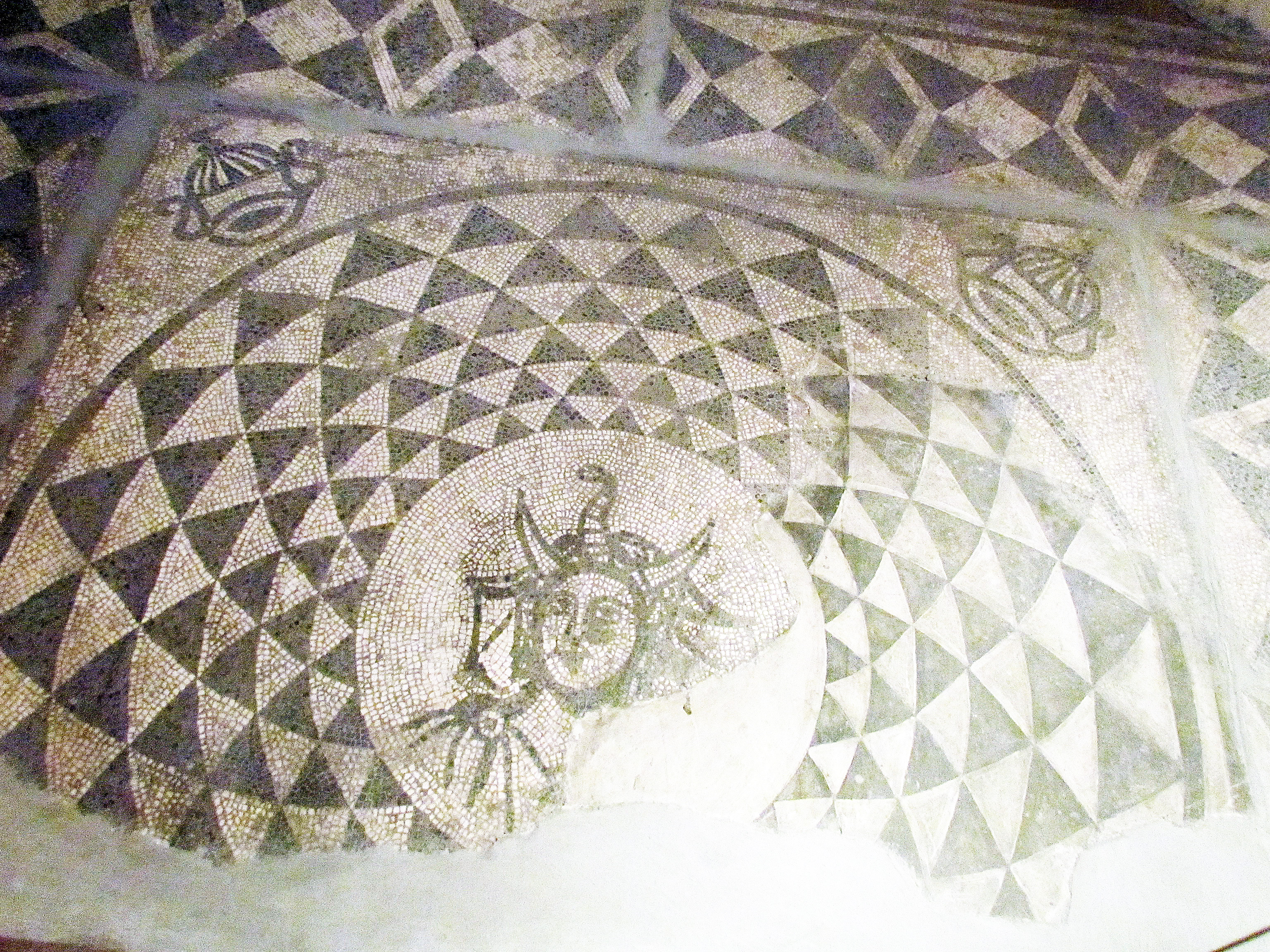
Roman mosaic with an allegory of Africa

The main works exhibited here include:

- a mosaic of putti from the Terme Achilliane, showing them inviting you to enjoy your stay in the baths ("Vtere Feliciter")
- fragment of a frieze showing Apollo and Artemis in a gigantomachy, 3rd century AD
- male torso, dedicated to Jupiter, found near the monastery of Sant'Agostino by principe Biscari in 1737.
- statue of Hercules in a lionskin just after killing the Nemean Lion
- statue of Hercules resting, Farnese Hercules type, holding one of the apples of the Hesperides
- plinth with dolphins
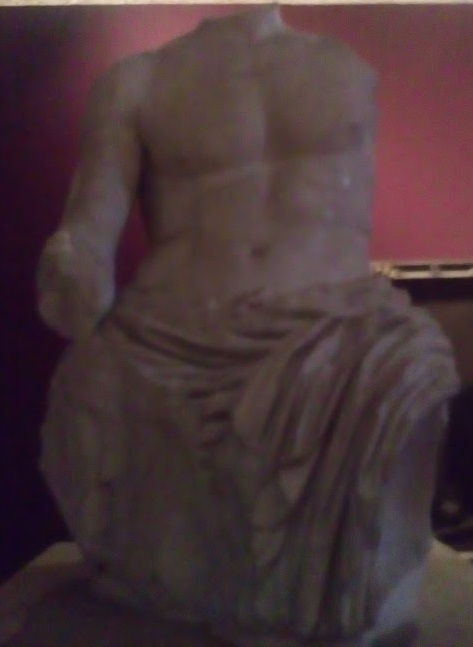
Torso of Jupiter

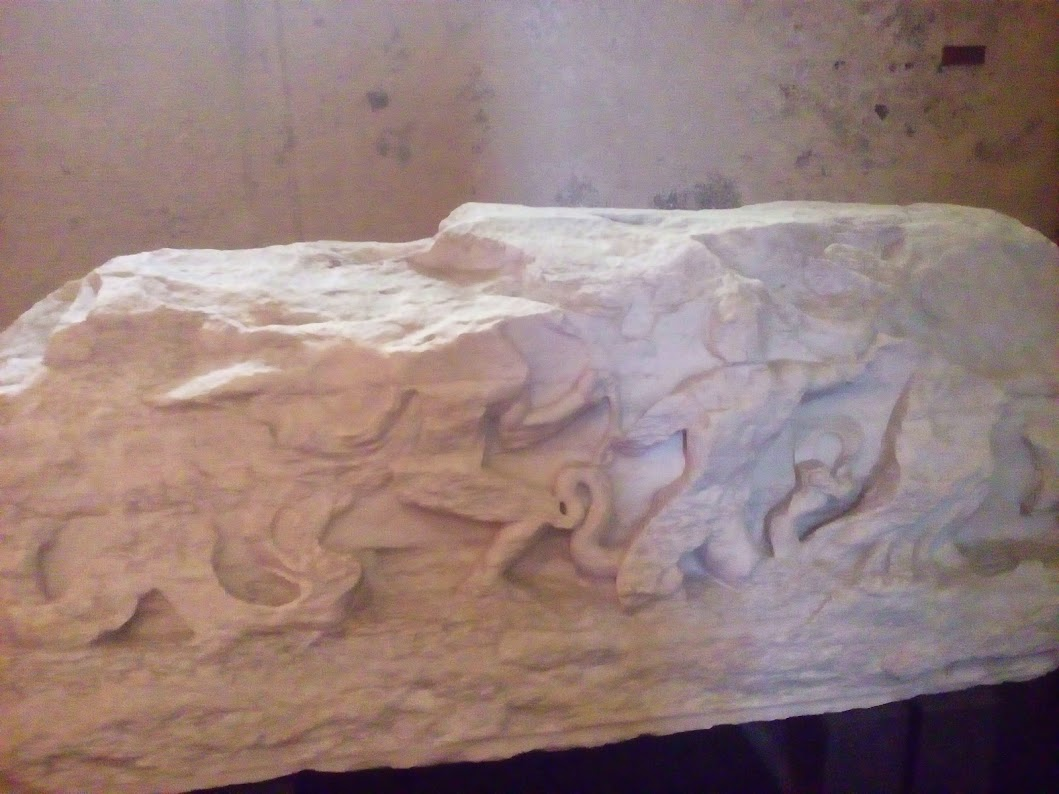
Frieze of a gigantomachy

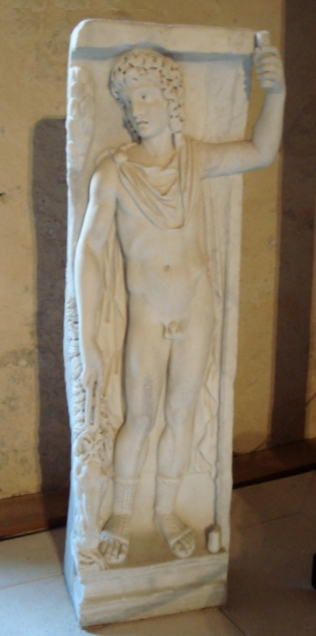
Bellerophon, 2nd century AD

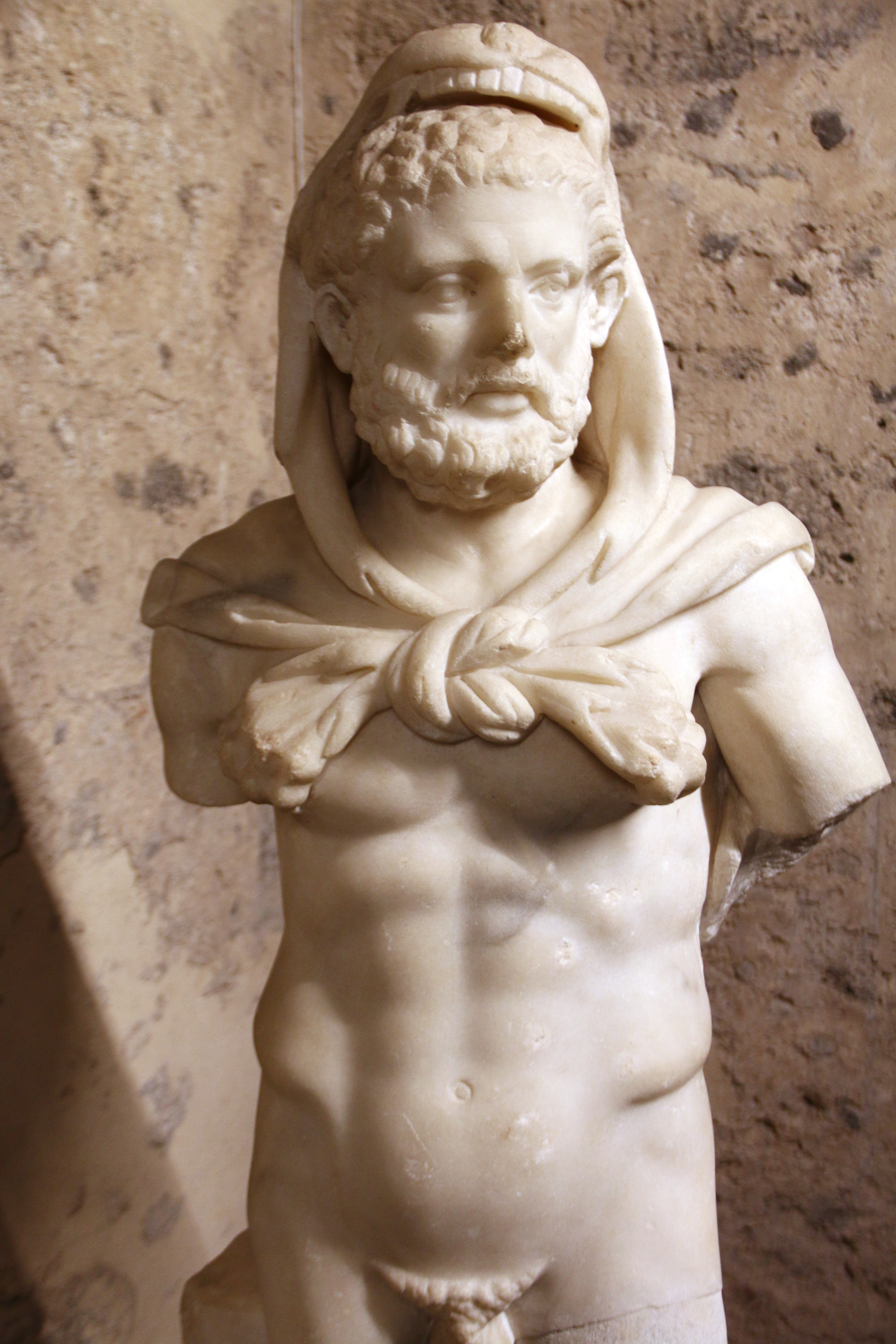
Hercules in Lionskin, 2nd century AD

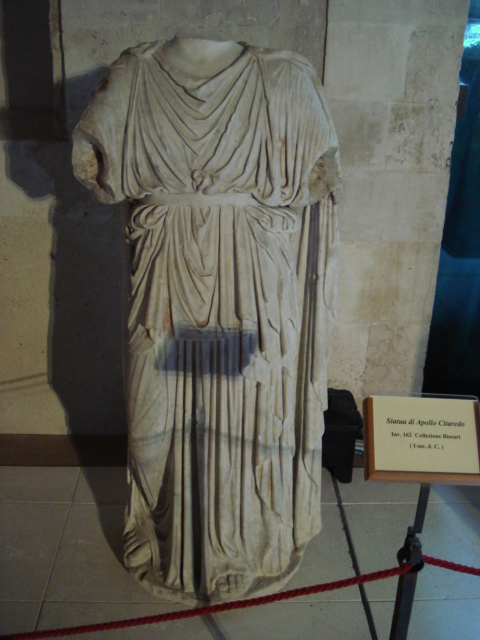
Apollo with a Cithara, 1st century AD

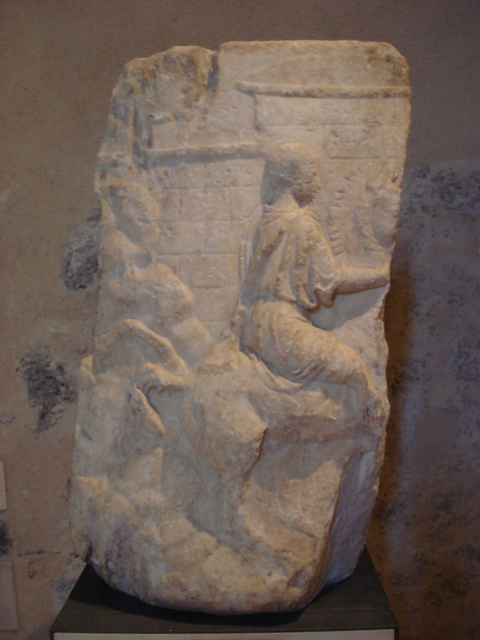
Relief from a historiated column

==== Sala ====
This houses displays of clay statues of subjects such as Aphrodite, a small dog fighting a cockerel, a nymph on a rock and a prehistoric head. Particularly notable is a colossal ram, whilst the most important work in the room is a fragment of a cavalryman, probably from a historiated column, found near porta Carlo V.

==== Torre del Sale ====
Named after its previous use as a storehouse for salt, it now houses a mosaic showing a head, thought to be an allegory for Africa, and a bust of an Egyptian woman.

==== Sala di San Giorgio / Sala della Cappella ====
This displays around 2000 bronze figurines, of which 1600 are from the Benedettini collection and the rest from the Biscari collection. They date to the Archaic, Siceliot, Greek, Etruscan-Italic and Hellenistic eras. It also houses a 420 BC marble relief of Demeter and Kore found on Montevergine hill in 1930 and several Greek vases such as the red-figure Crater with Perseus and Medusa from excavations in Camarina.

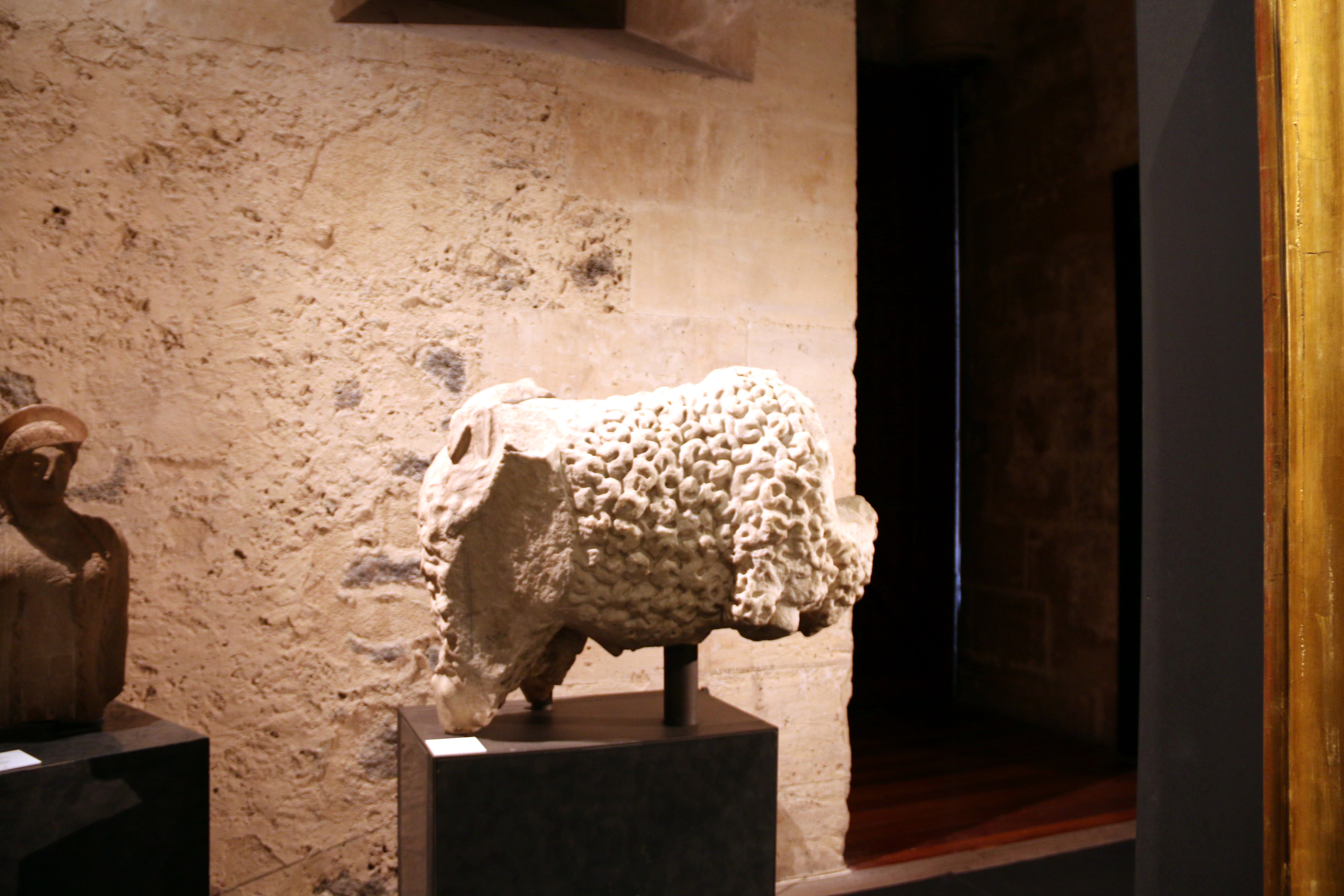
Colossal ram, 2nd century AD

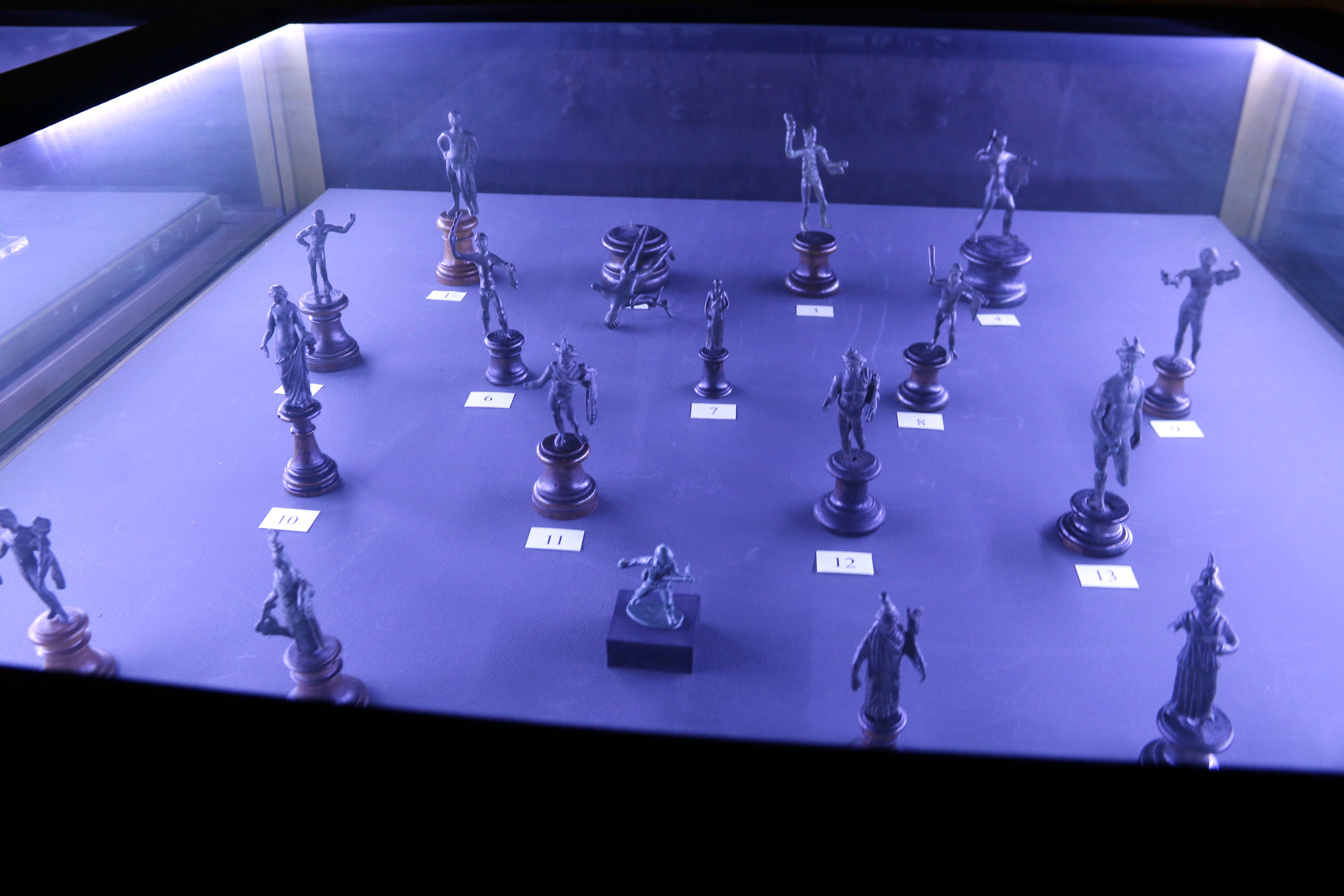
Figurines

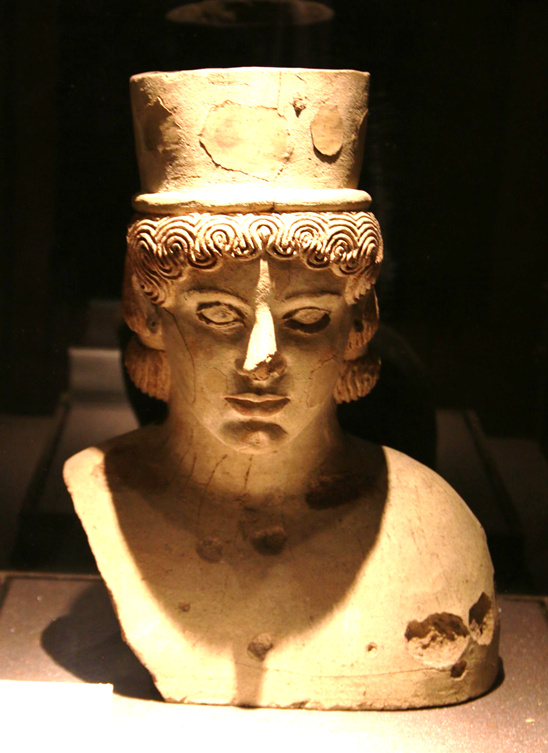
Bust of Demeter, 5th century BC

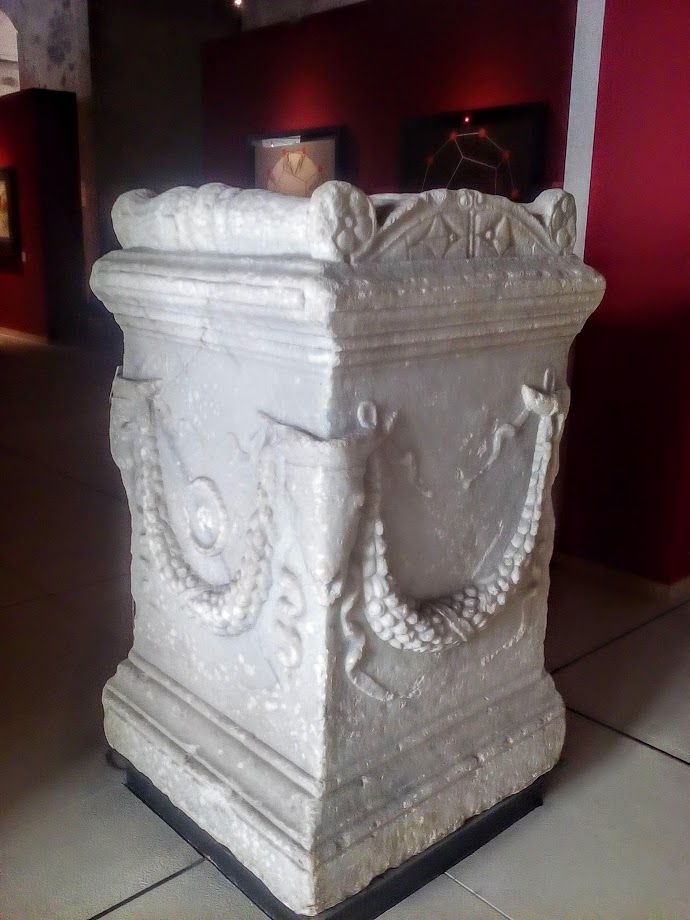
Carcaci cippus

==== Other rooms ====
These house inscriptions and statues, together forming the permanent "Voci di Pietra" display:

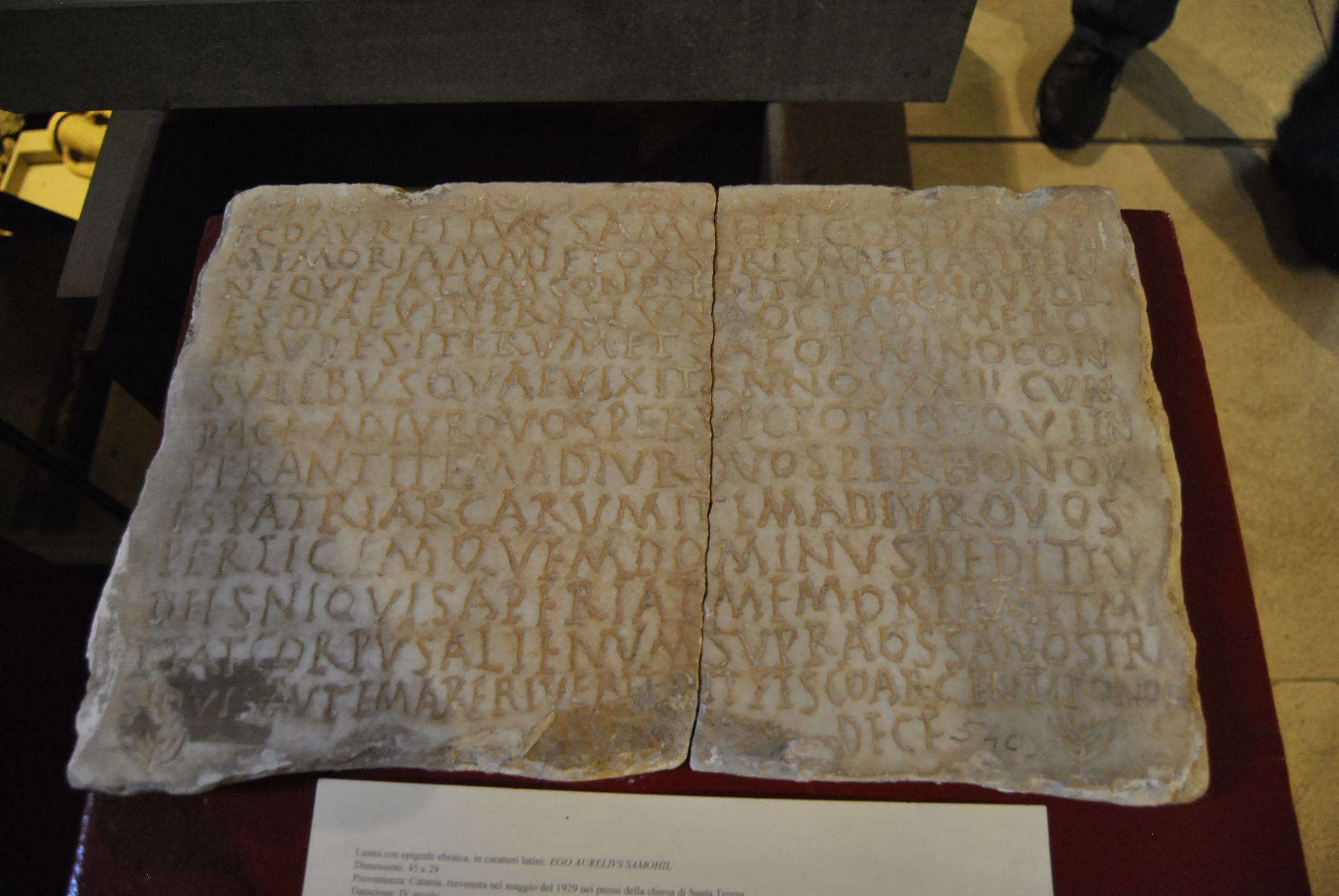
Inscription of Aurelius Samohil

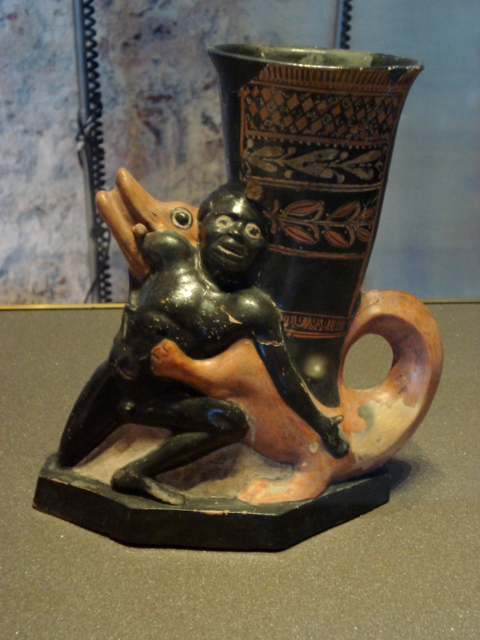
Attic rhyton

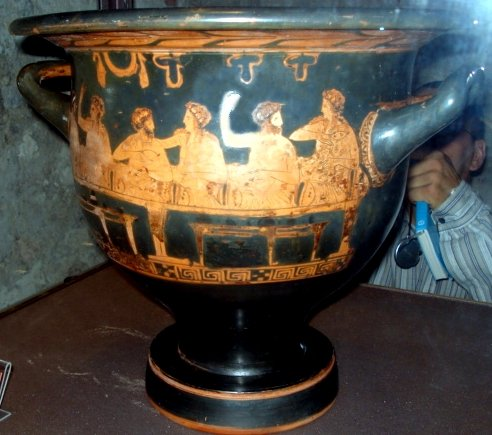
Attic crater with a symposium scene

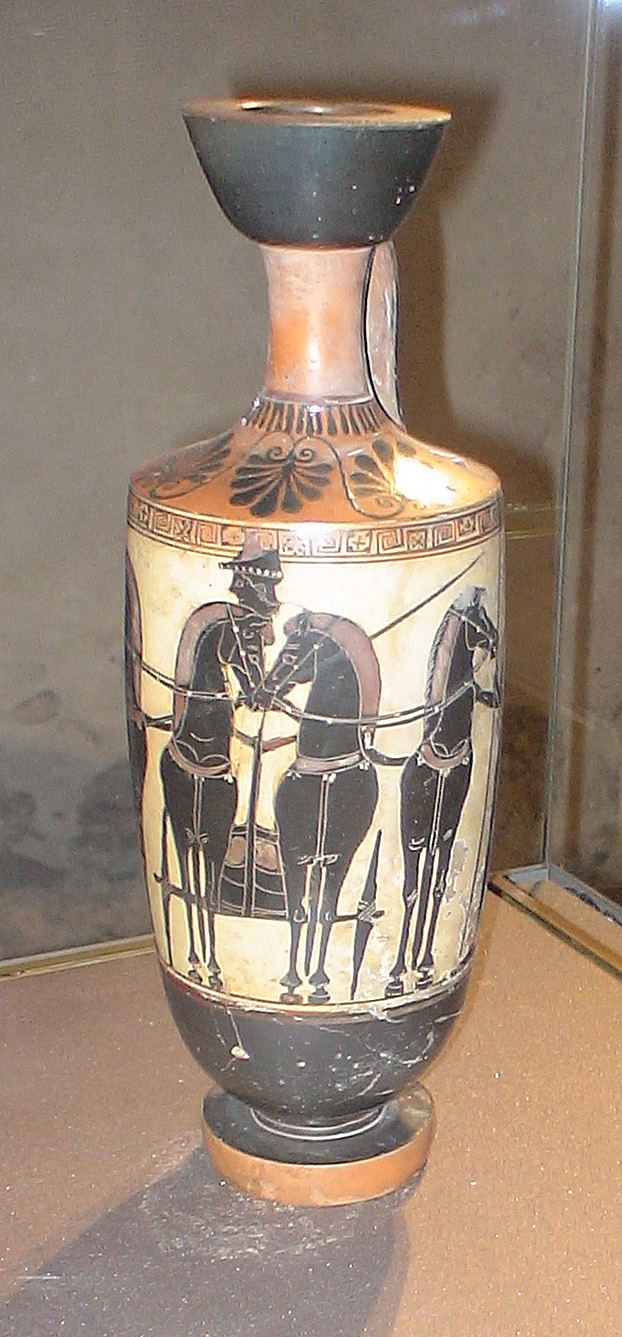
Black-figure Attic lekythos

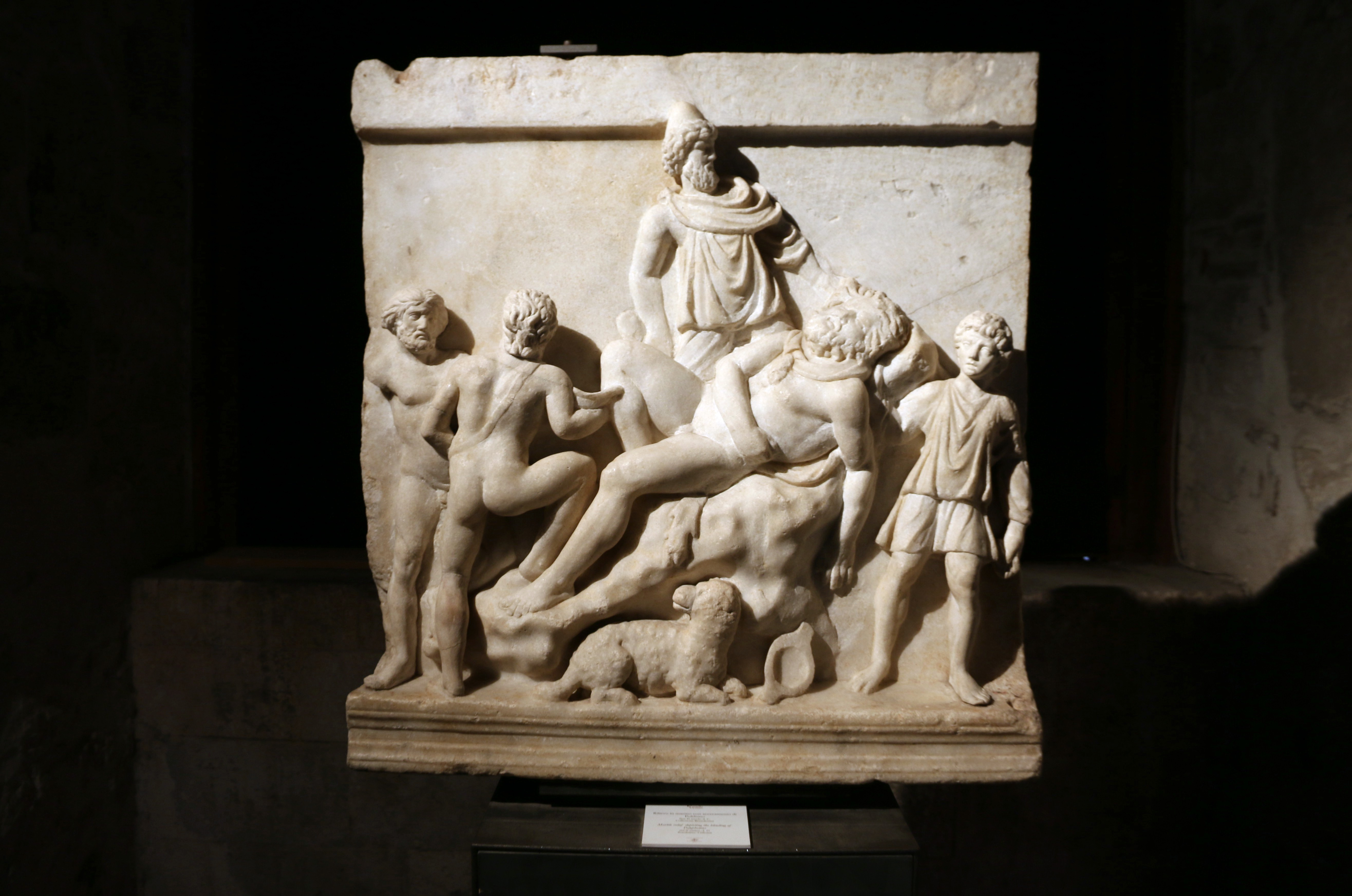
Polyphemus and Ulysses, 2nd century AD

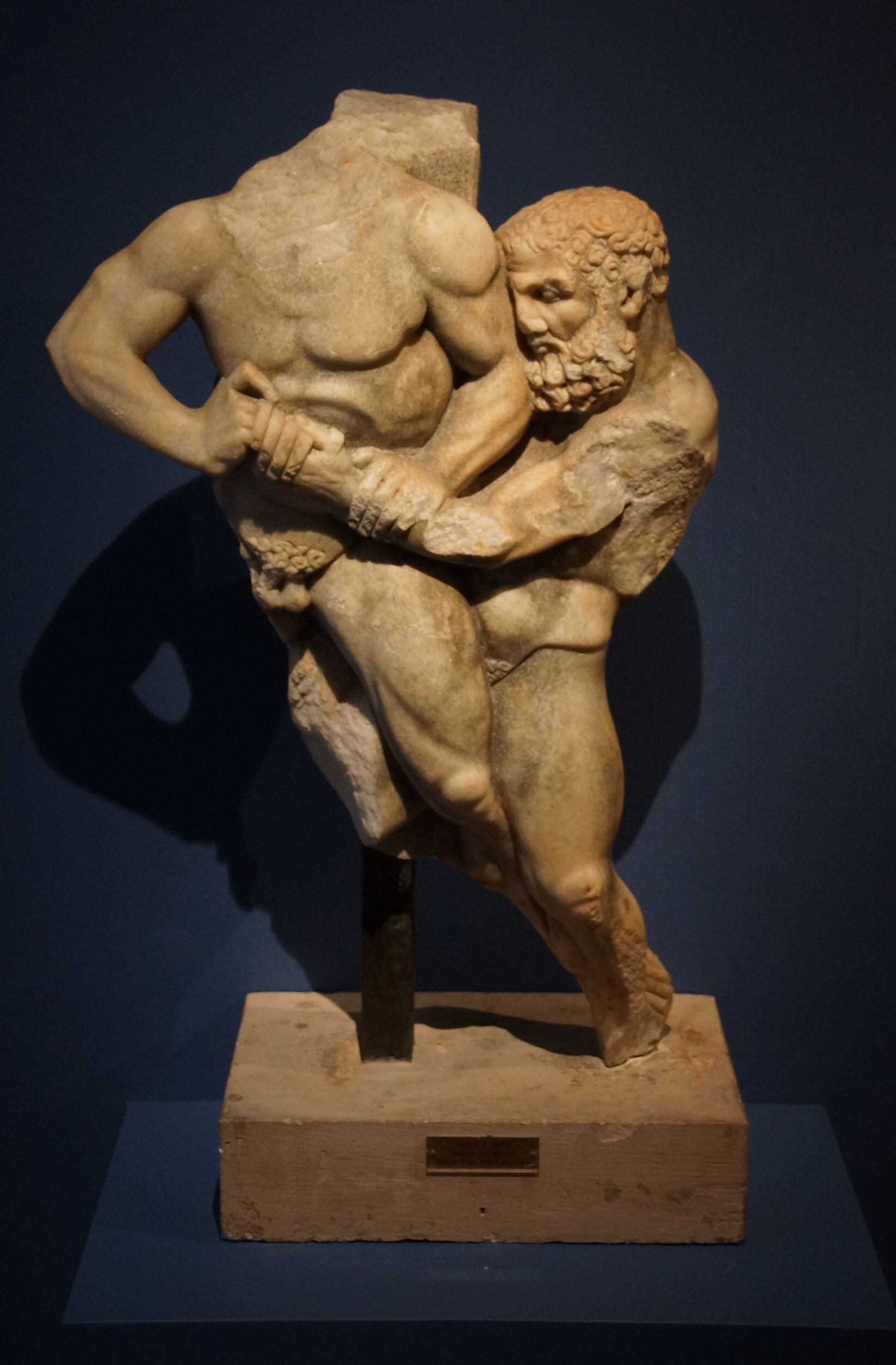
Wrestlers, 2nd century AD

=== First Floor ===
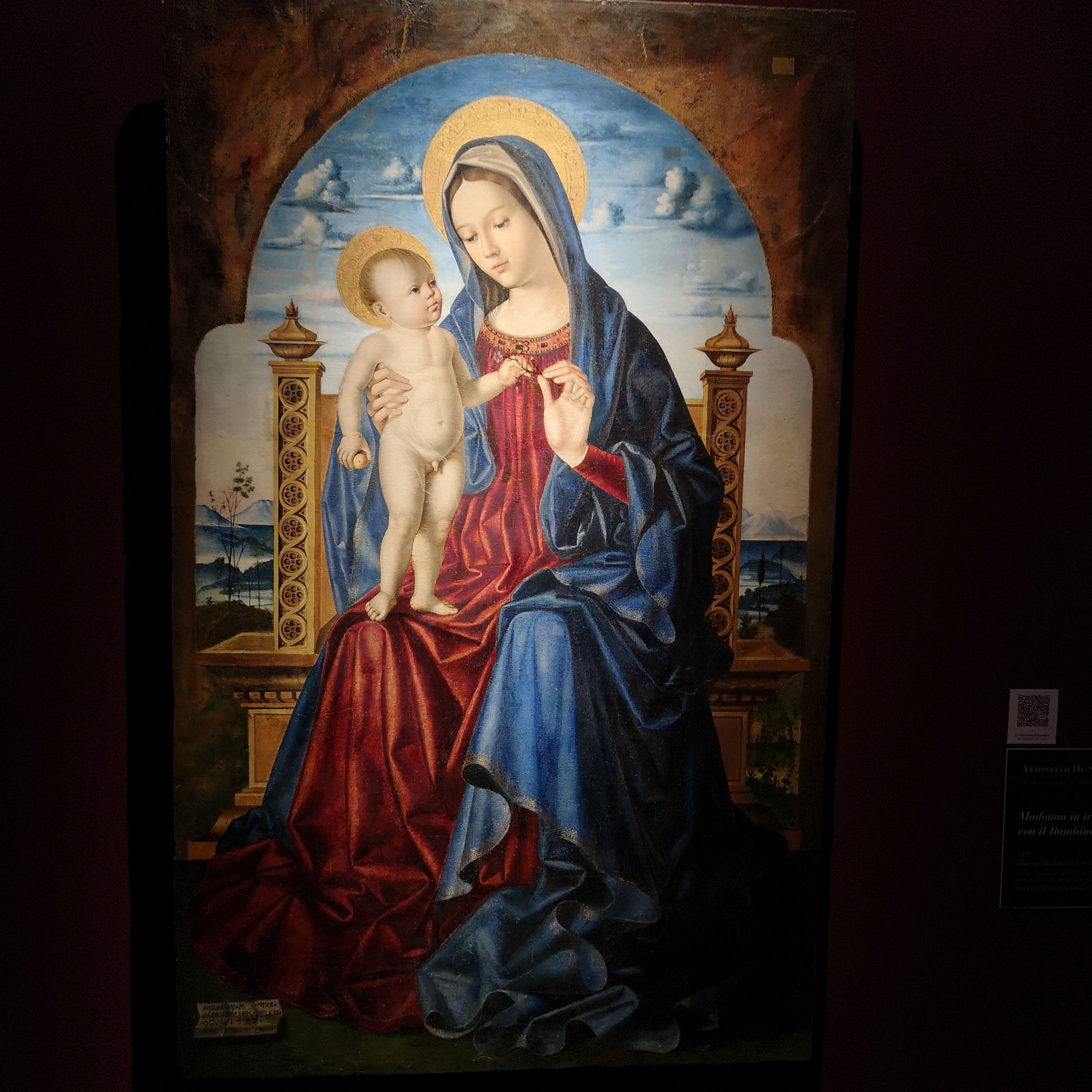
Antonello de Saliba - Madonna and Child Enthroned

==== Sala ====
This houses:

- two tomb reliefs (one for a 16th-century recipient of the Order of the Golden Fleece and the other of a sleeping figure)
- Byzantine icons
- a Limoges enamel plaque of the crucifixion
- a 'smalto' of The Virgin in Glory
- Portrait of a Gentleman by El Greco (recently restored using funds from OperaTua)
- a 15th-century painting of Madonna with Saint Lucy and Saint John
- parts of a polyptych by Antonello de Saliba from Santa Maria di Gesù church: Madonna and Child, St Anthony, St Francis of Assisi, Resurrection
- St Onufrius by Bernazzano.
- 17th century chess set from the Benedettini
- Last Supper by Luis de Morales.

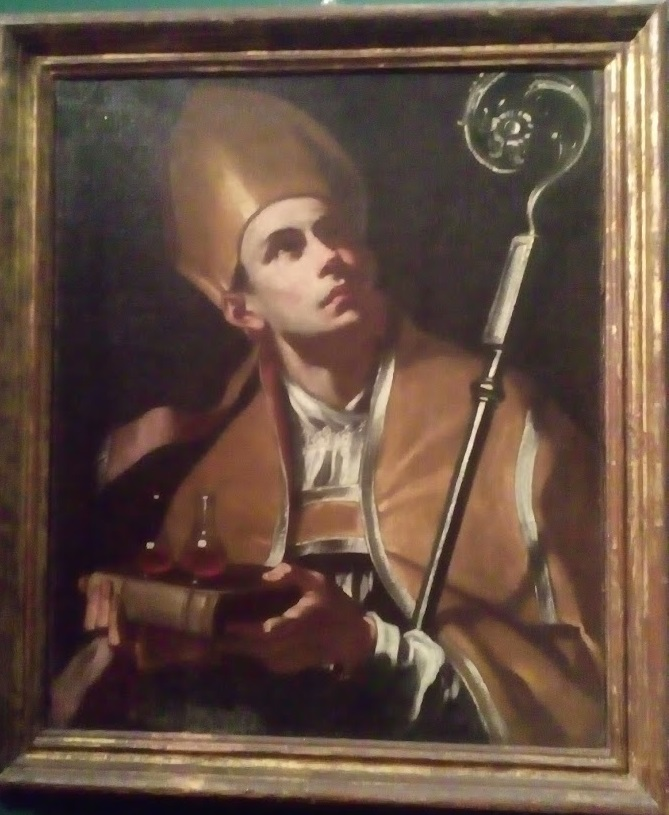
Francesco Solimena - Saint Januarius

==== Salone dei Parlamenti ====
This mainly houses 17th and 18th century works, including masterpieces by Matthias Stomer from the collection donated to the city by Giovan Battista Finocchiaro in 1826 such as Death of Cato, Crucifixion of St Peter, Suicide of Seneca and Christ Mocked. It also displays works by Pietro Novelli such as St Christopher, St John the Baptist, Madonna and Child with St Louis of France and The Good Samaritan. Also notable are:

- the only surviving copy of Caravaggio's Nativity with St. Francis and St. Lawrence, the original of which was stolen by the Mafia and has never been recovered - the copy was produced in 1627 by Don Gaspare Orioles da Paolo Geraci.
- Christ at the Column by Mario Minniti
- Penitent Mary Magdalene, school of Giovanni Lanfranco
- St Luke Painting the Virgin Mary by Mattia Preti
- St Catherine in Ecstacy, previously attributed to Giulio Cesare Procaccini and later to Pier Francesco Mazzucchelli.
- Prophet, St Francis with a Crucifix and Lament over the Dead Christ by Jusepe de Ribeira and his school
- Mary Magdalene by Andrea Vaccaro
- Three Kings by Simone de Wobreck
- St Januarius attributed to Francesco Solimena

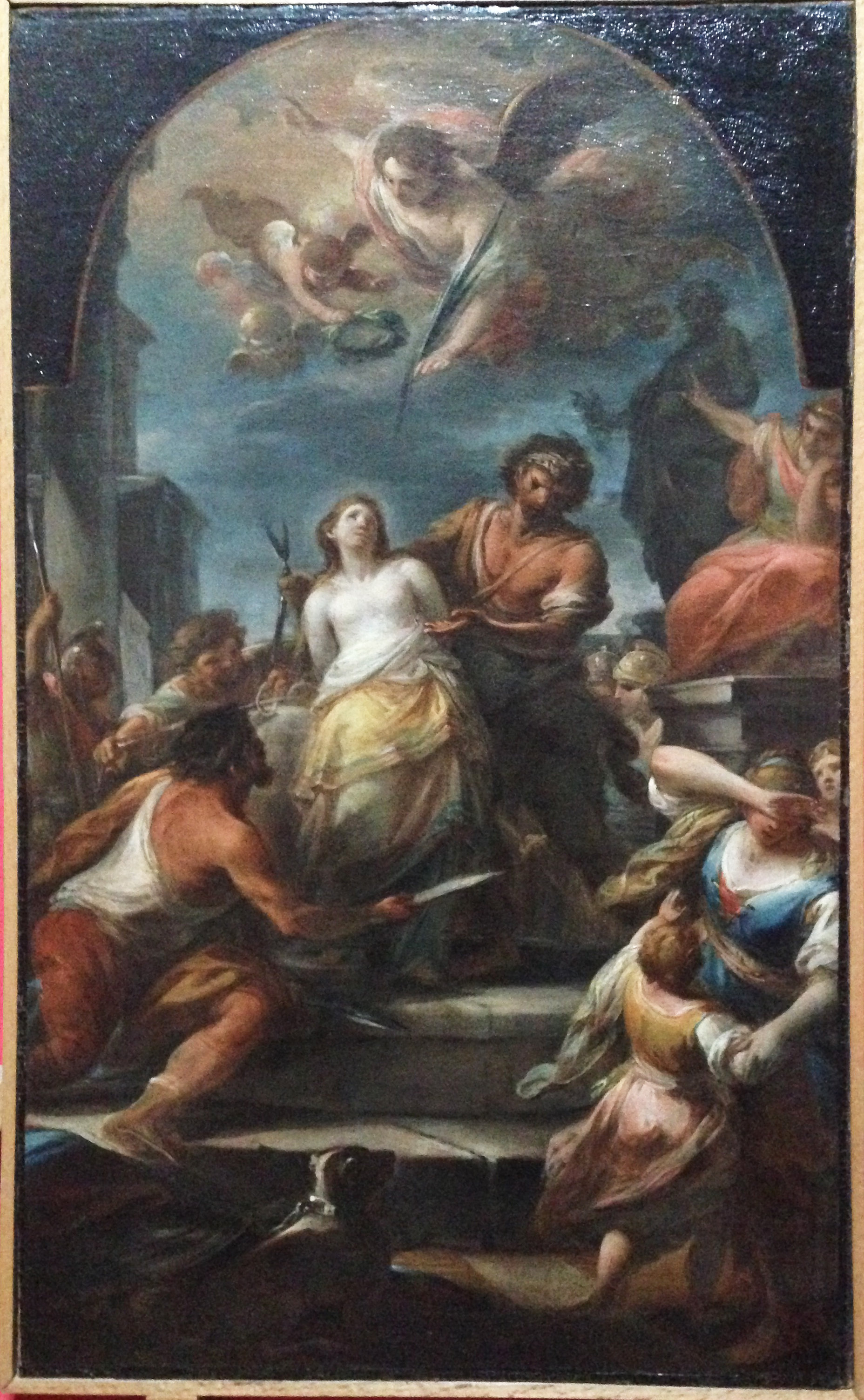
Mariano Rossi - Martyrdom of Saint Agatha

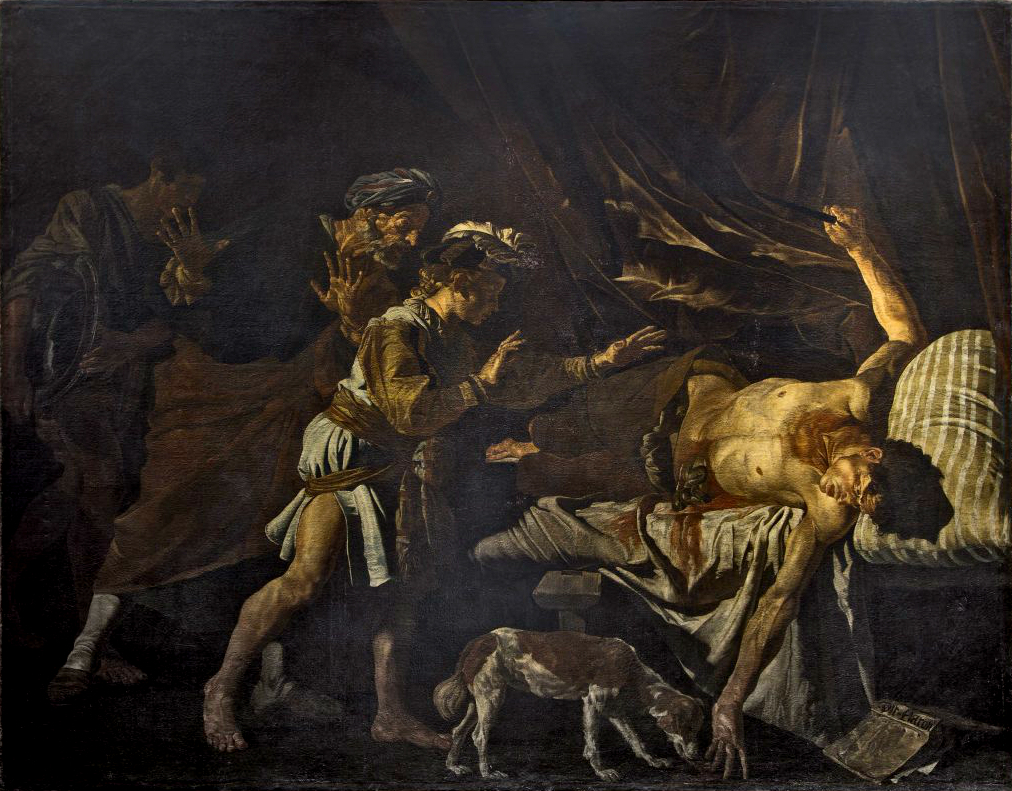
Matthias Stomer - Death of Cato

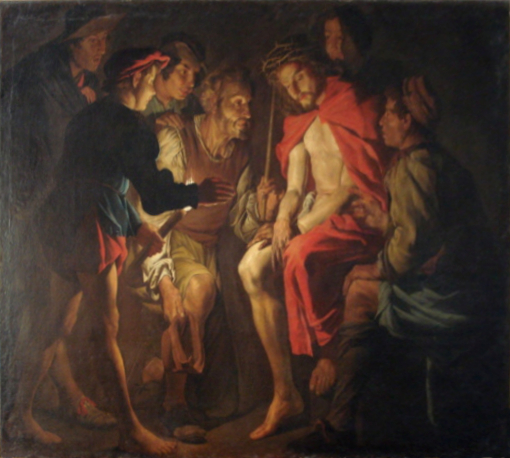
Matthias Stomer, Christ Mocked

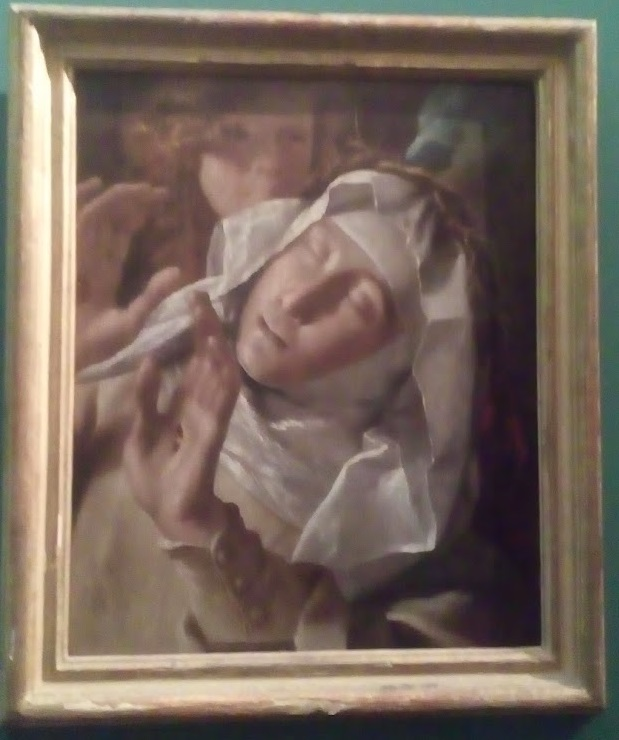
Morazzone - Ecstacy of Saint Catherine of Siena

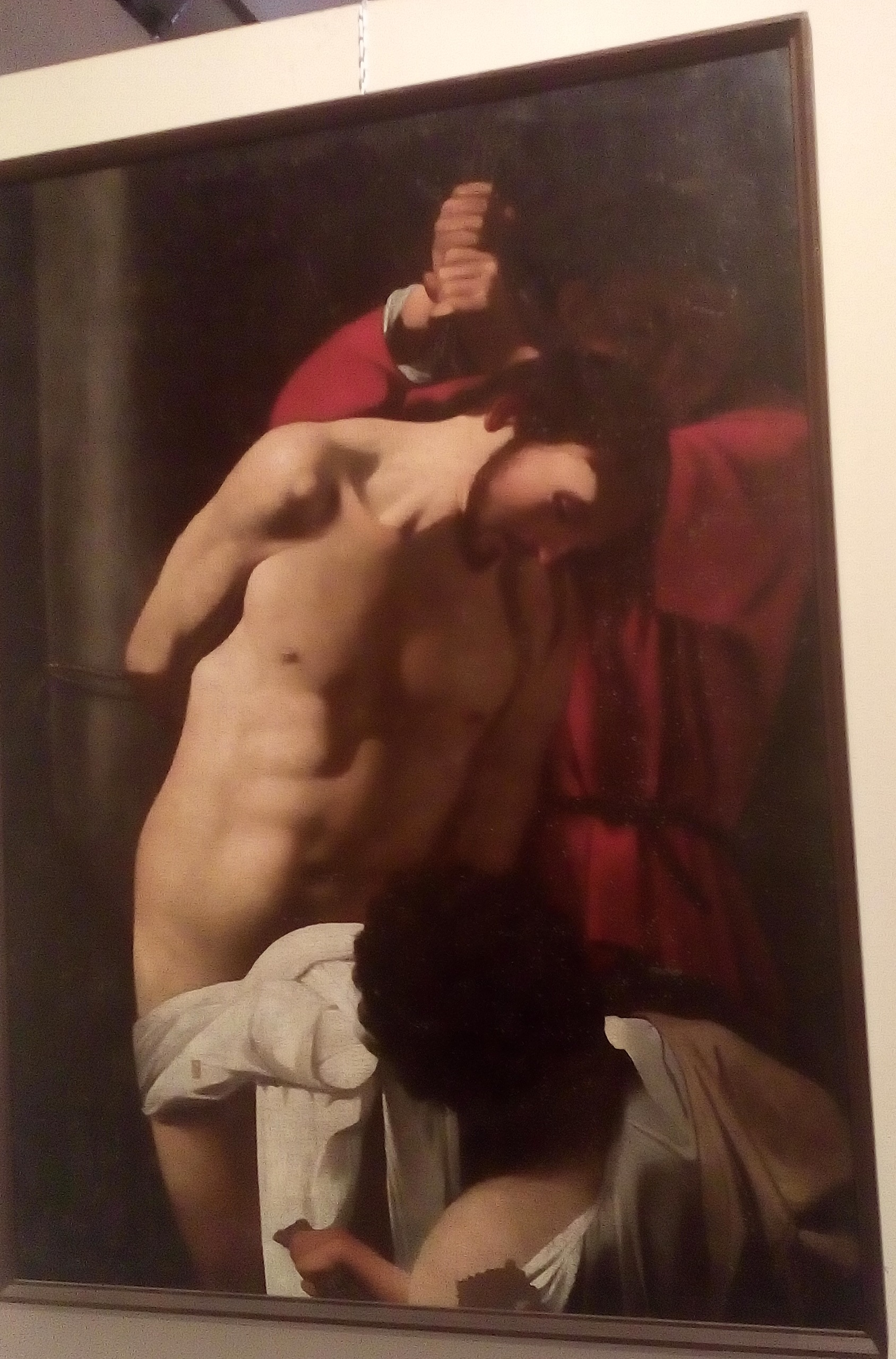
Mario Minniti - Christ at the Column

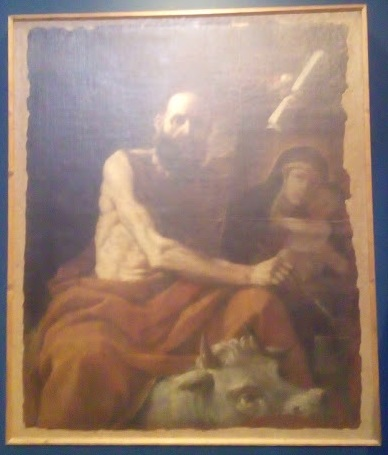
Mattia Preti - Saint Luke as a Painter

==== Sala ====
This room houses 18th century works:

- Coronation of Saint Agatha, Death of Saint Joseph and Saint Francesco Caracciolo, oil sketches by Marcello Leopardi
- Martyrdom of Saint Agatha, oil sketch by Mariano Rossi.
- Still Life with Fruit and a Landscape and Still Life with Fruit and a Fountain by Aniello Ascione.
- Landscape with Ruins, anonymous west Italian painter, one of five paintings from Villa Scabrosa; a pair withNaval Battle
- Woman Selling Fish by Giuseppe Bonino (1760)
- Kneeling Aphrodite, statue by a central Italian artist in classical style
- Mary Magdalene, attributed to Guglielmo Borremans
- St Agatha Before Quintianus, wax sculpture
- St Agatha Crowned in Prison, wax sculpture
- door sculpture in the style of the Gagini family
- Portrait of Prior Placido Scammacca, shown holding an ancient Greek vase
- Birth of Venus, small painting by Michele Rocca
- Birth of Adonis, small painting Michele Rocca

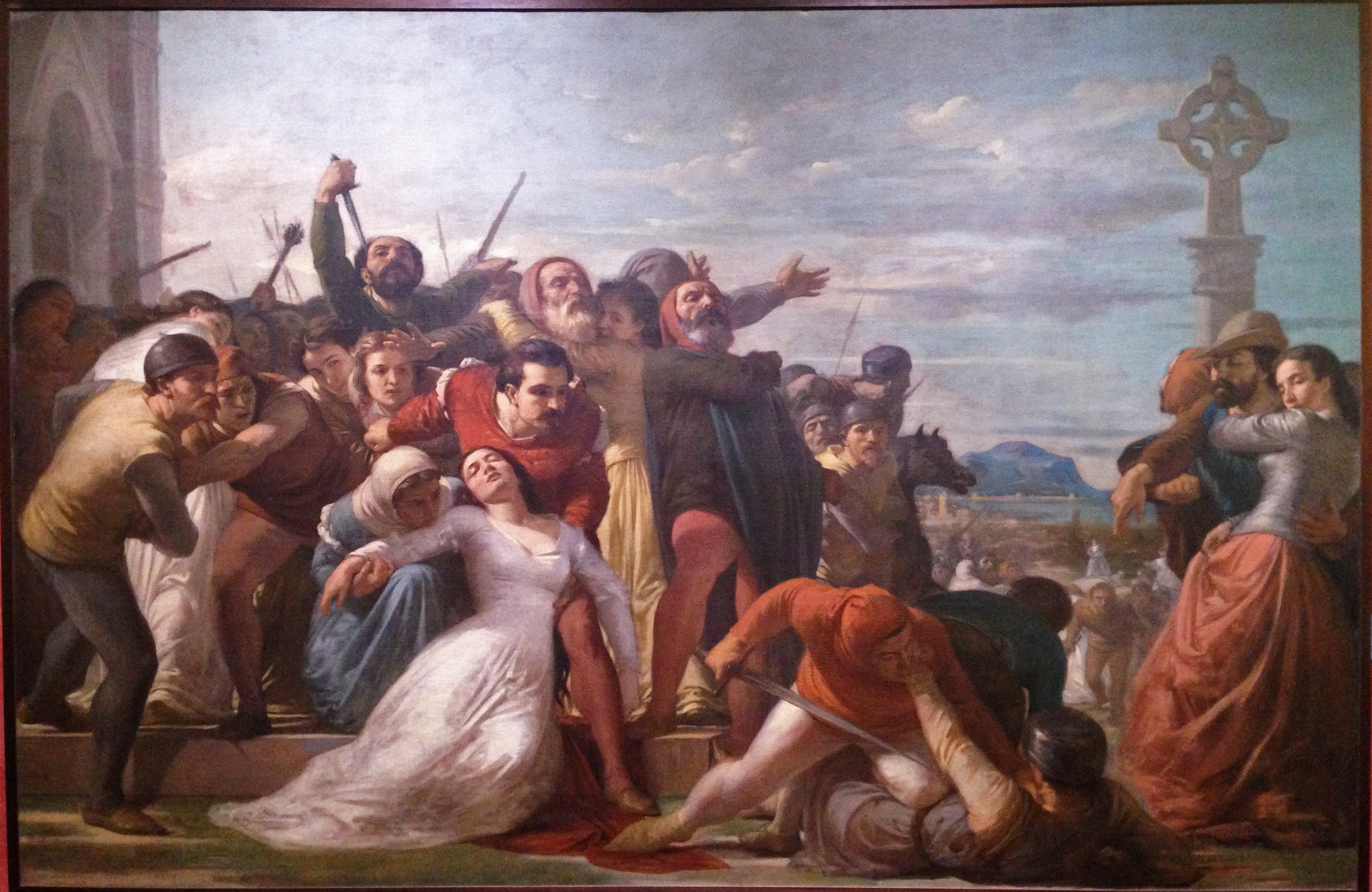
Michele Rapisardi - The Sicilian Vespers

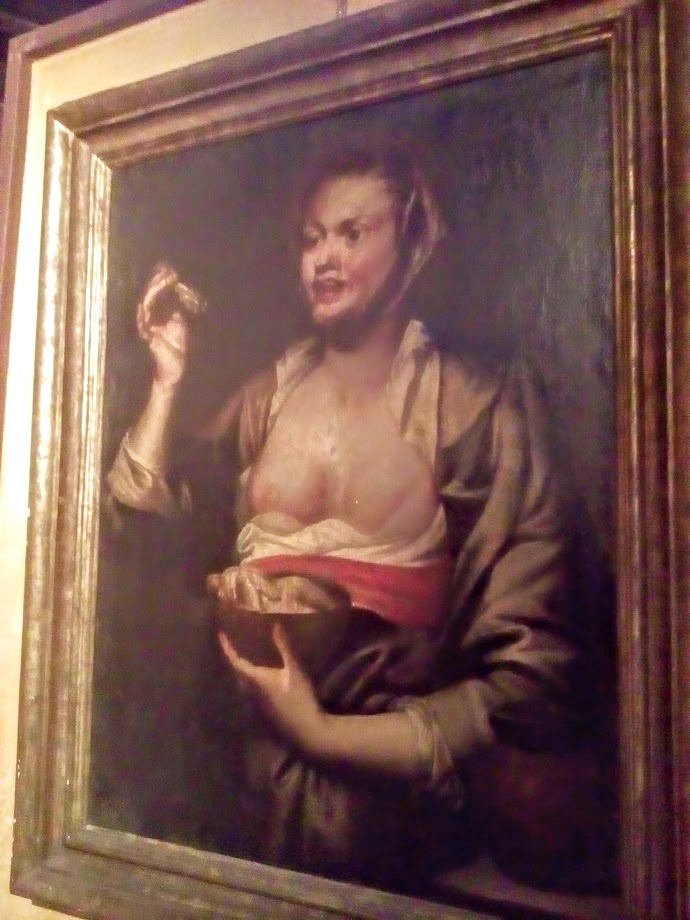
Giuseppe Bonino - Woman Selling Fish

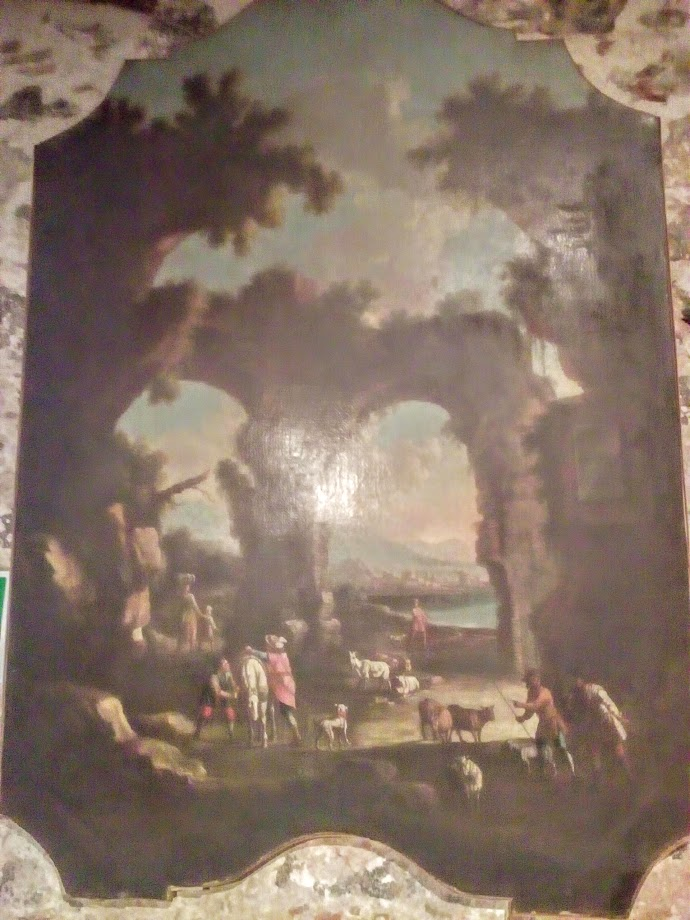
Anon. - Landscape with Ruins

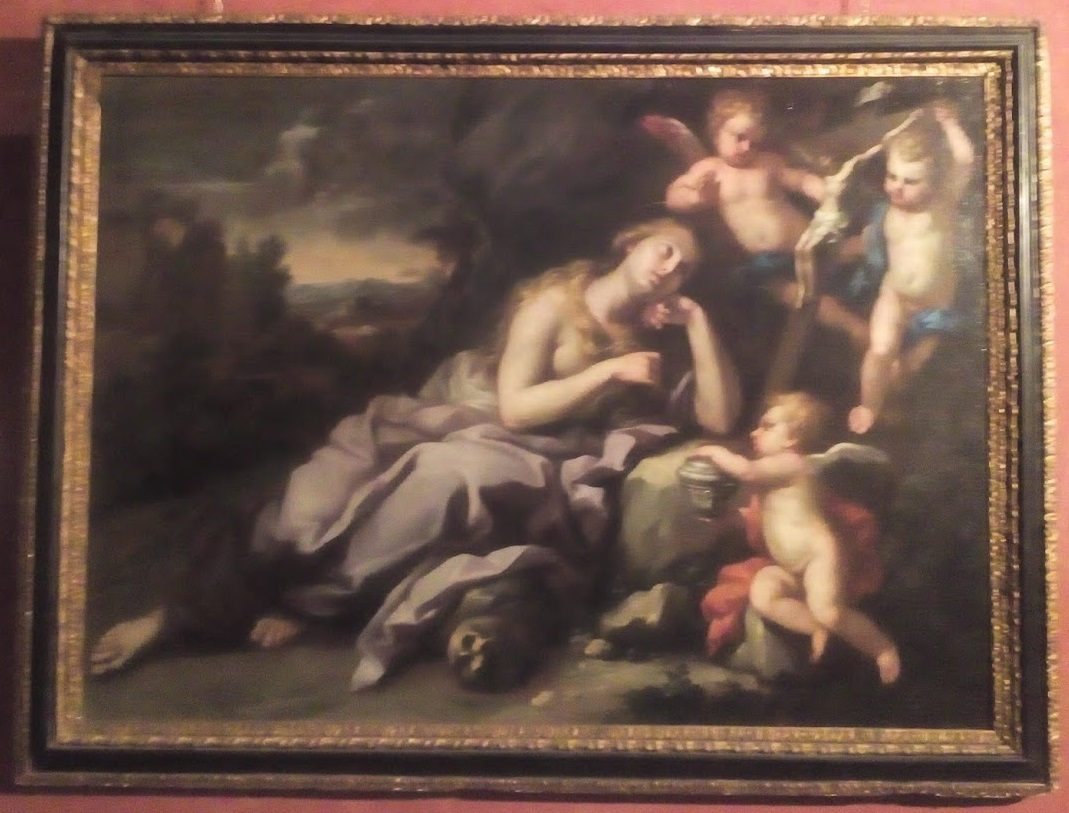
Possibly Guglielmo Borremans - Mary Magdalene

==== Sala Michele Rapisardi ====
As its name suggests this room mainly displays paintings by Michele Rapisardi, including his The Sicilian Vespers, Head of Ofelia Pazza, a self-portrait and a study for Vespers. It also houses works by Natale Attanasio (Sunt Lacrima Rerum, best known as "Le Pazze"; Women in the Fields; Tasso and Cardinal d'Este) and Bernardo Celentano (Provenzan Salvani in the piazza del Campo).

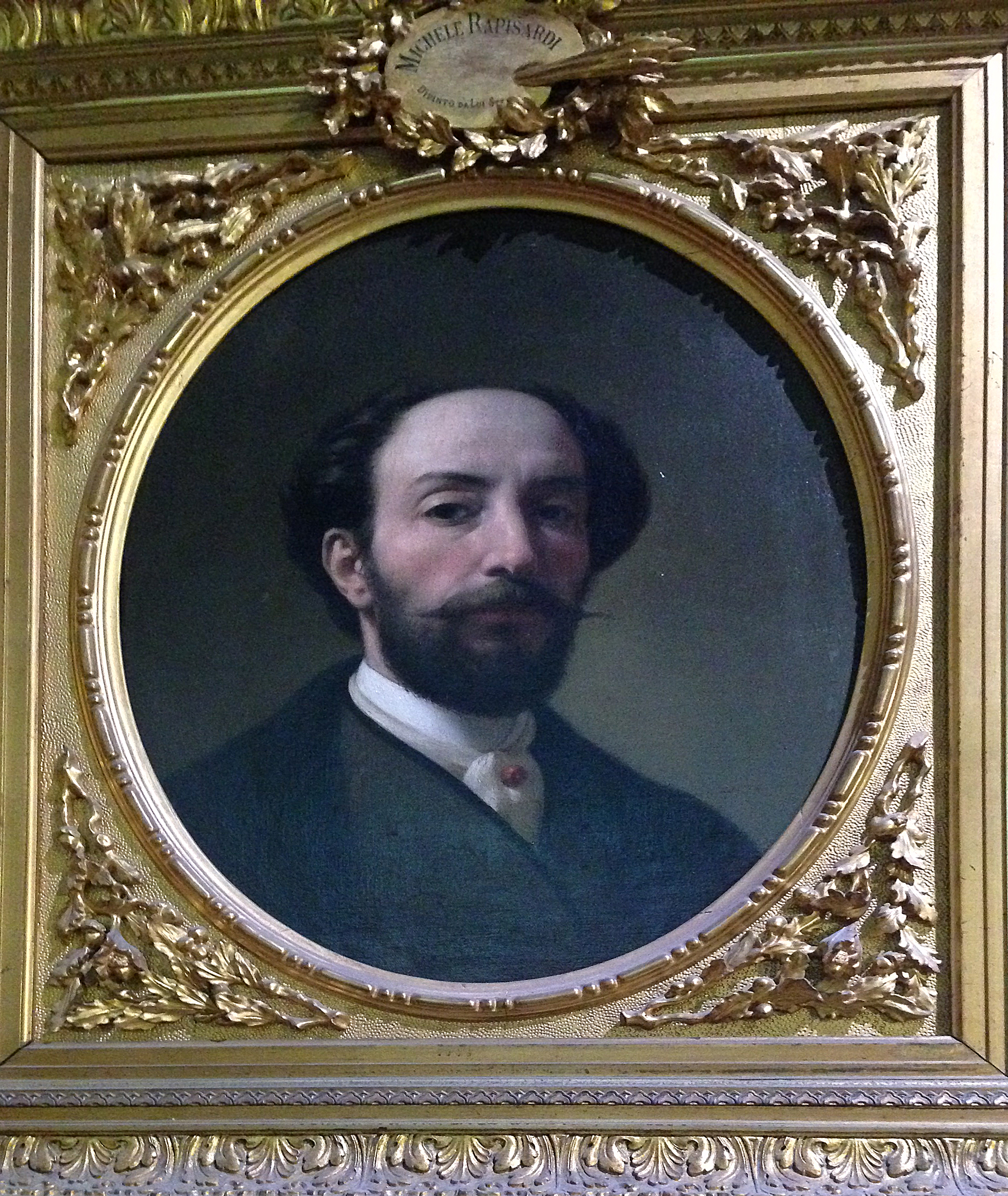
Michele Rapisardi - Self-portrait

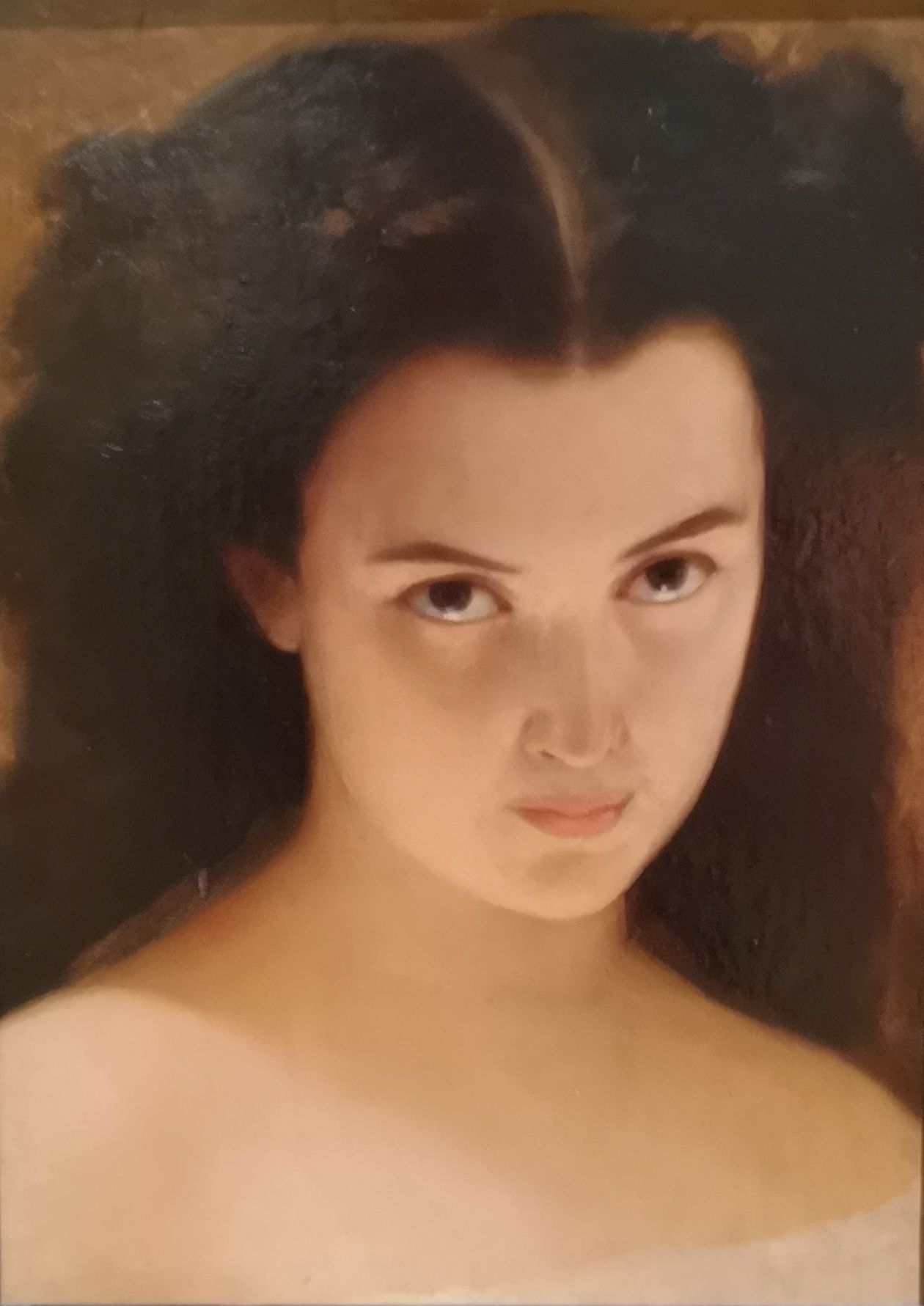
Michele Rapisardi - Head of Ofelia pazza

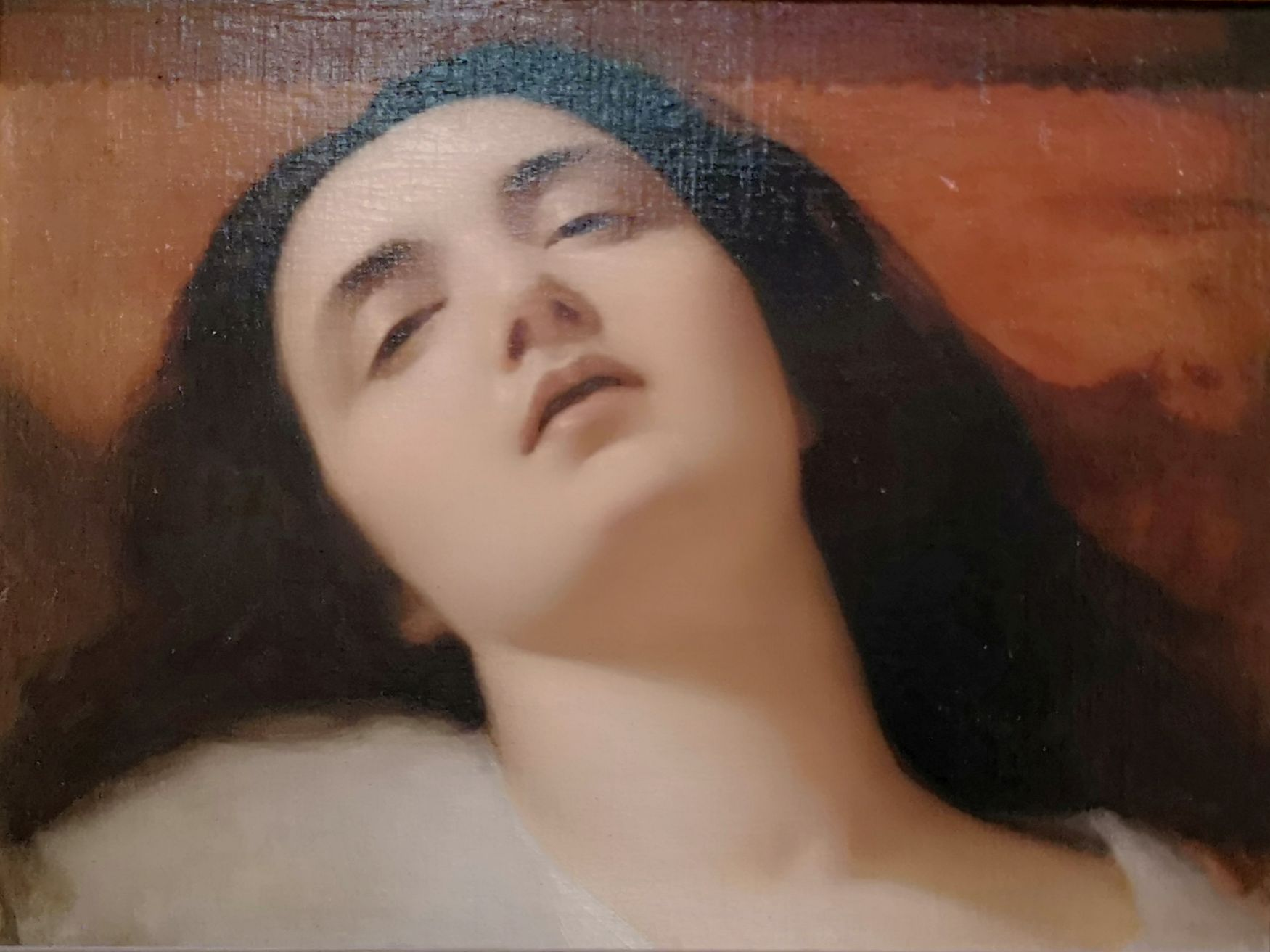
Michele Rapisardi - Study for The Sicilian Vespers

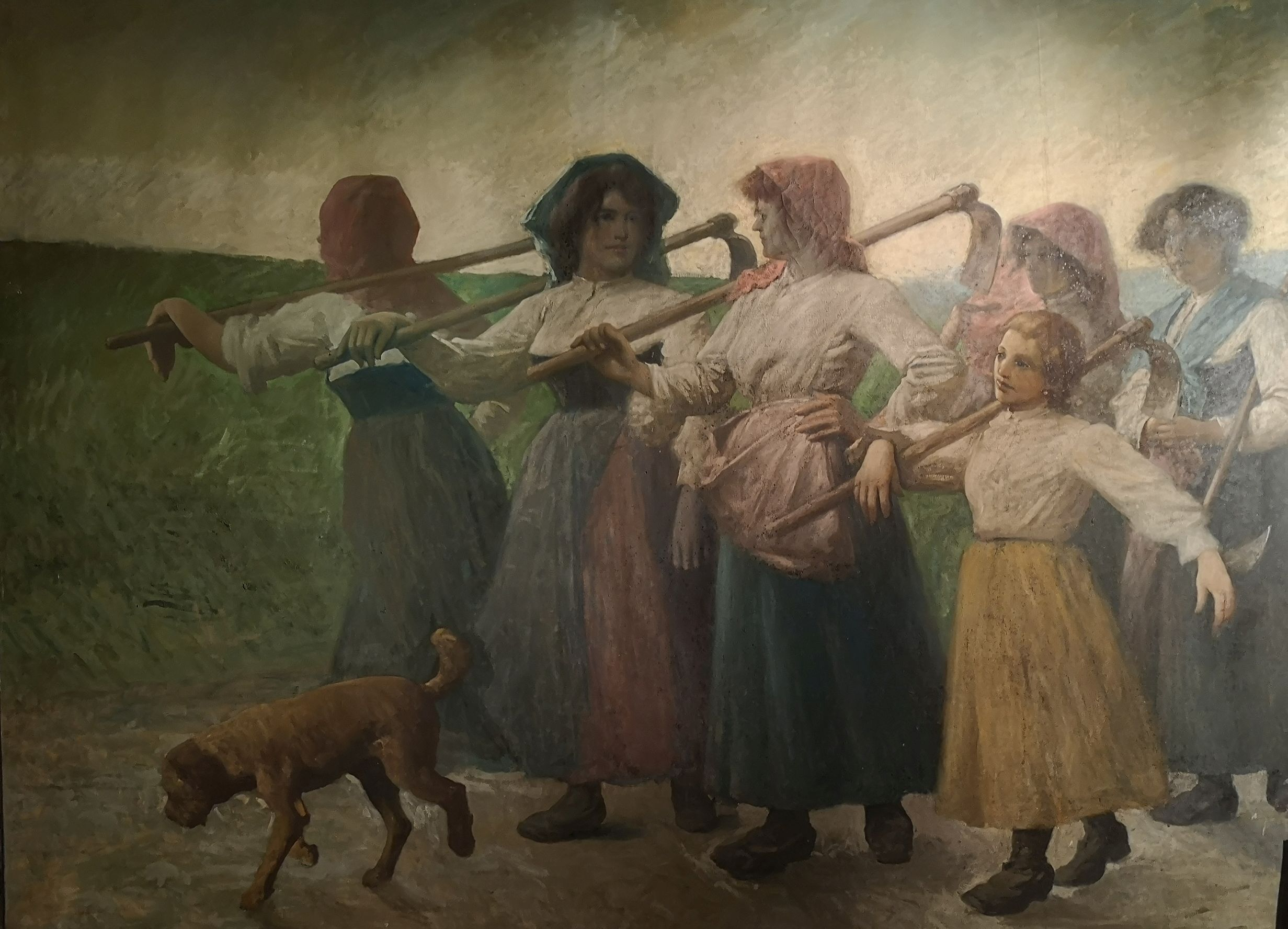
Natale Attanasio - Women in the Fields

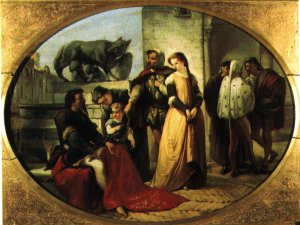
Bernardo Celentano - Provenzan Salvani in the piazza del Campo

=== Second floor ===
==== Sala ====
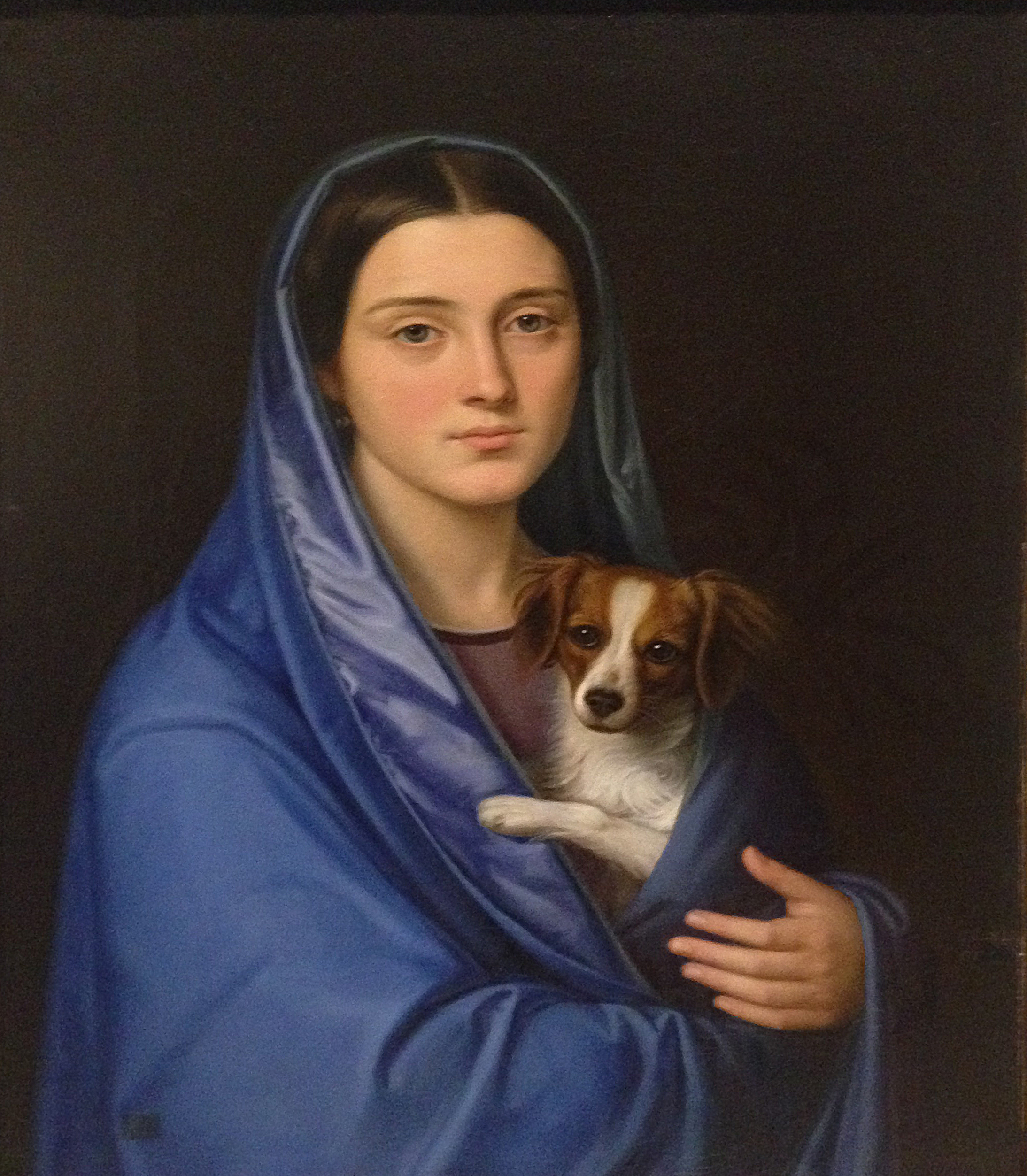
Giuseppe Gandolfo - Portrait of His Niece Clementina -

This houses several 19th-century portraits by Rapisarda, Giuseppe Rapisardi, Giuseppe Sciuti, Natale Attanasio, Calcedonio Reina, Francesco Lojacono, Pasquale Liotta, Domenico Morelli, Alessandro Abate, Antonino Gandolfo and Giuseppe Gandolfo, along with a number of 18th century Chinese vases, violins produced by Andrea Amati, Caltagirone ceramics, 17th century bronze statuettes of Venus and Vulcan and an 18th-century bronze statuette of Perseus.

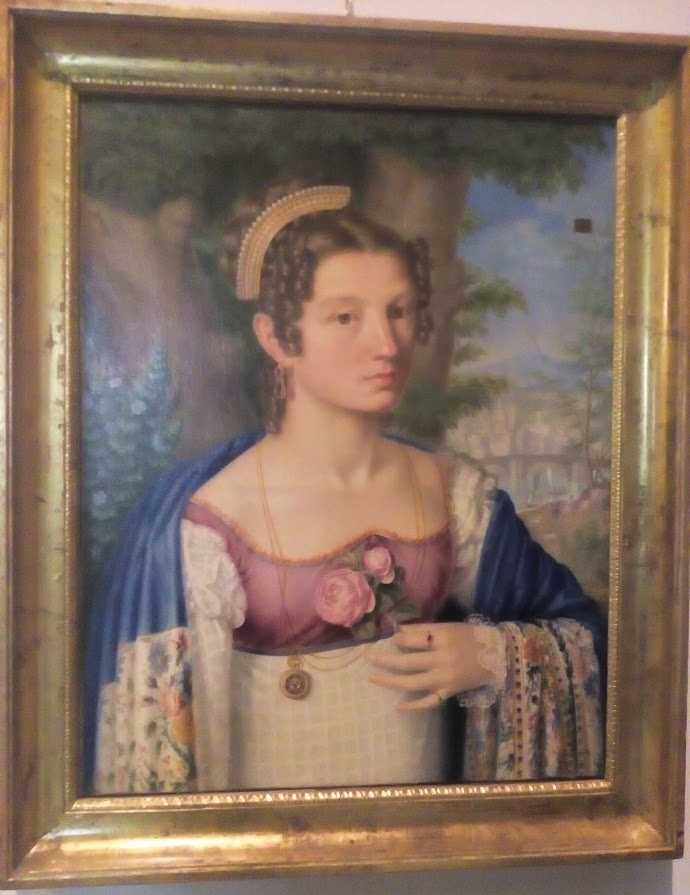
Antonino Gandolfo - Portrait of La Cognata

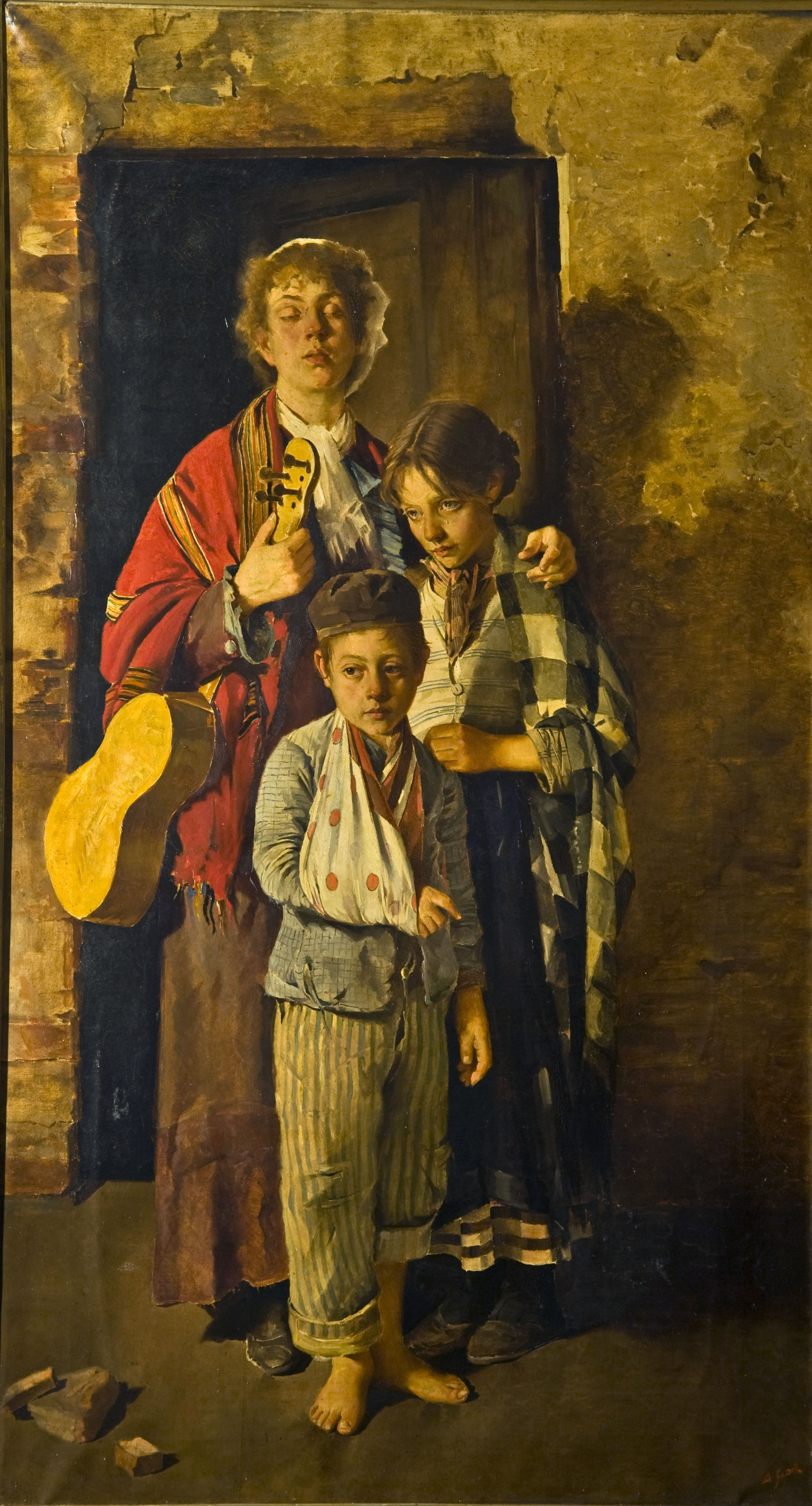
Antonino Gandolfo - Forced Music

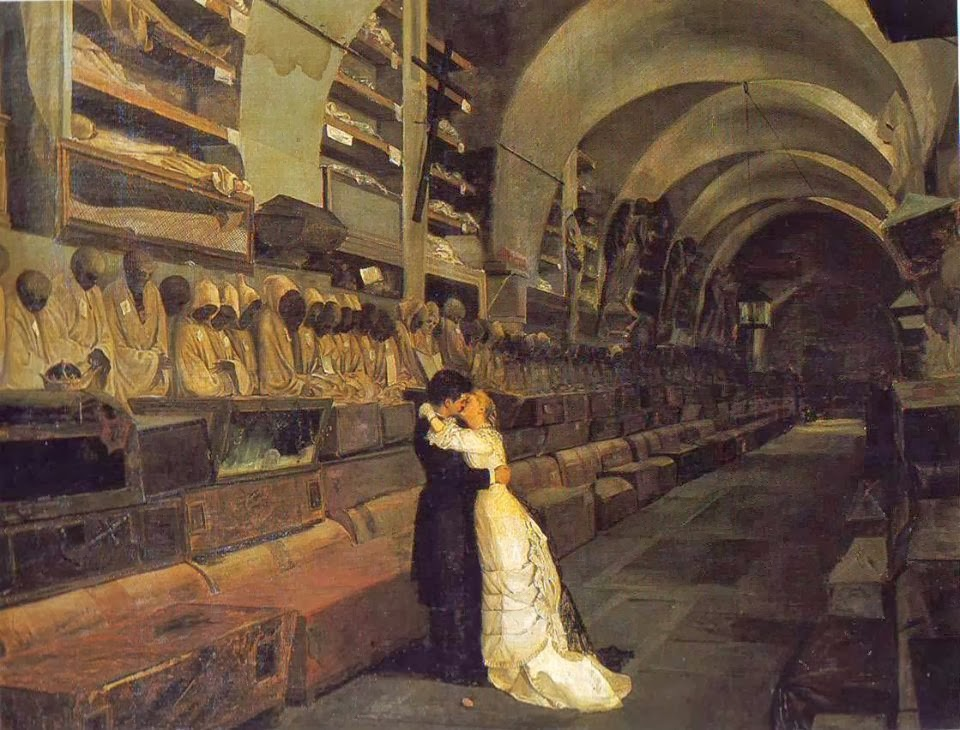
Calcedonio Reina - Love and Death

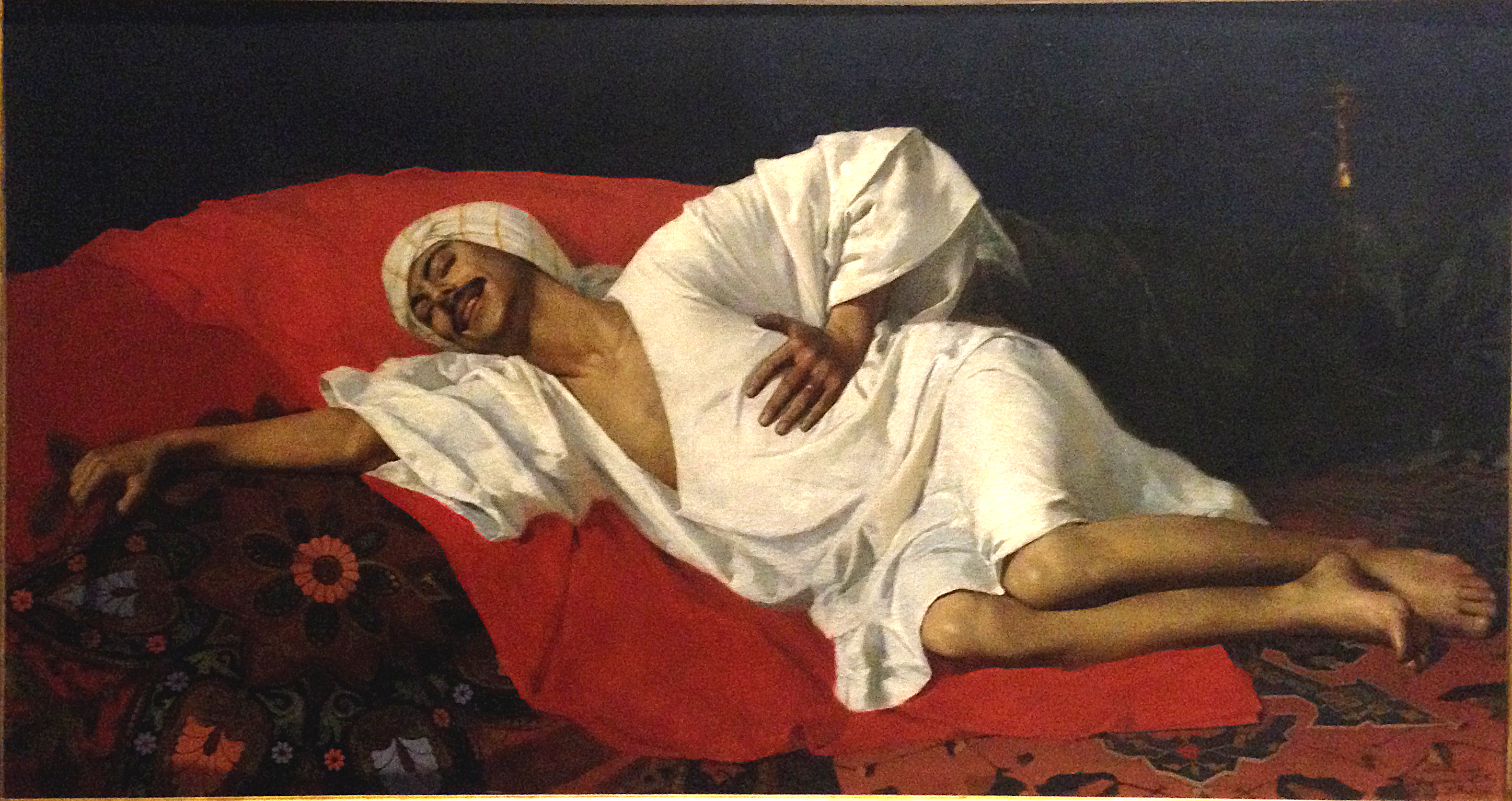
Pasquale Liotta - The Effect of Hashish

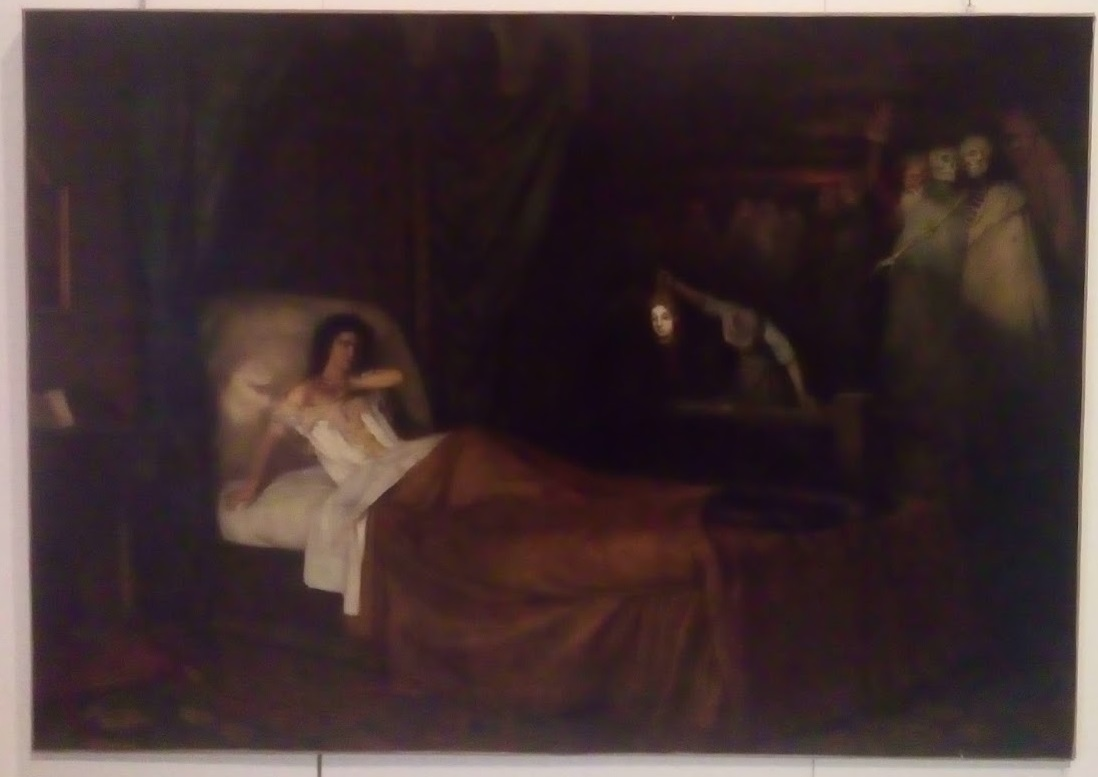
Pasquale Liotta - The Incubus of Elizabeth I

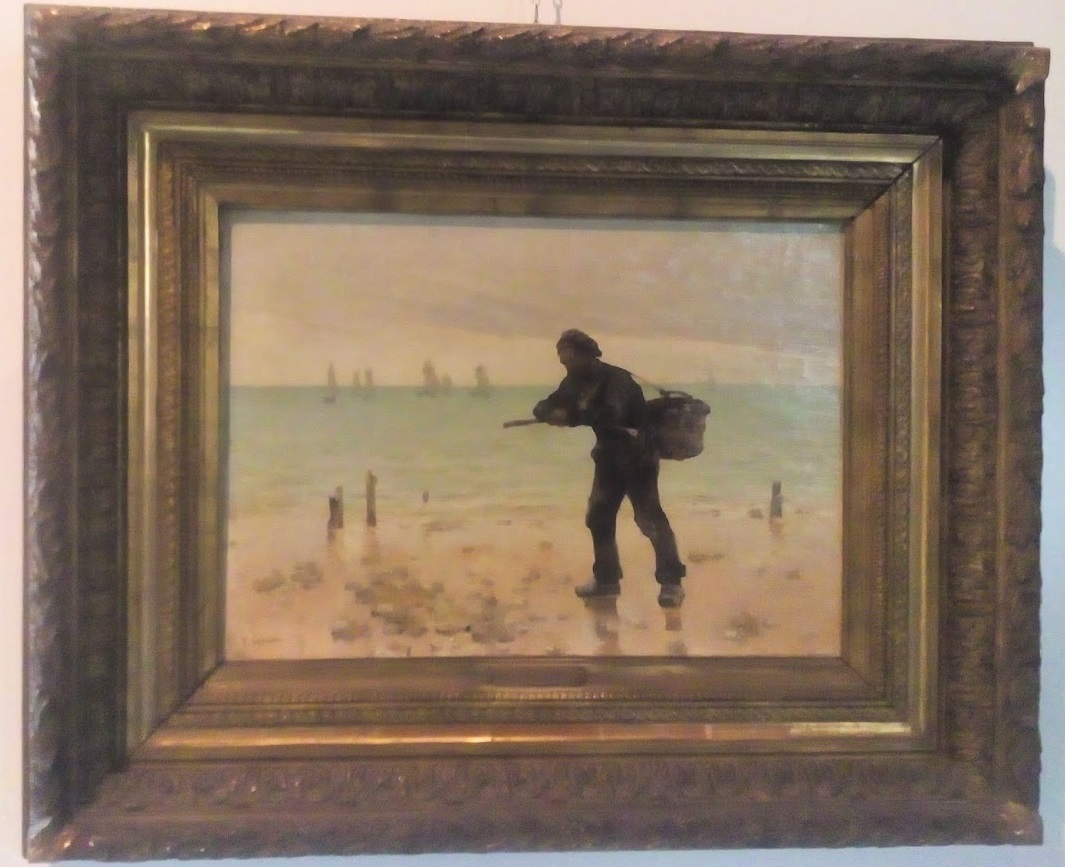
Francesco Lojacono - Fisherman

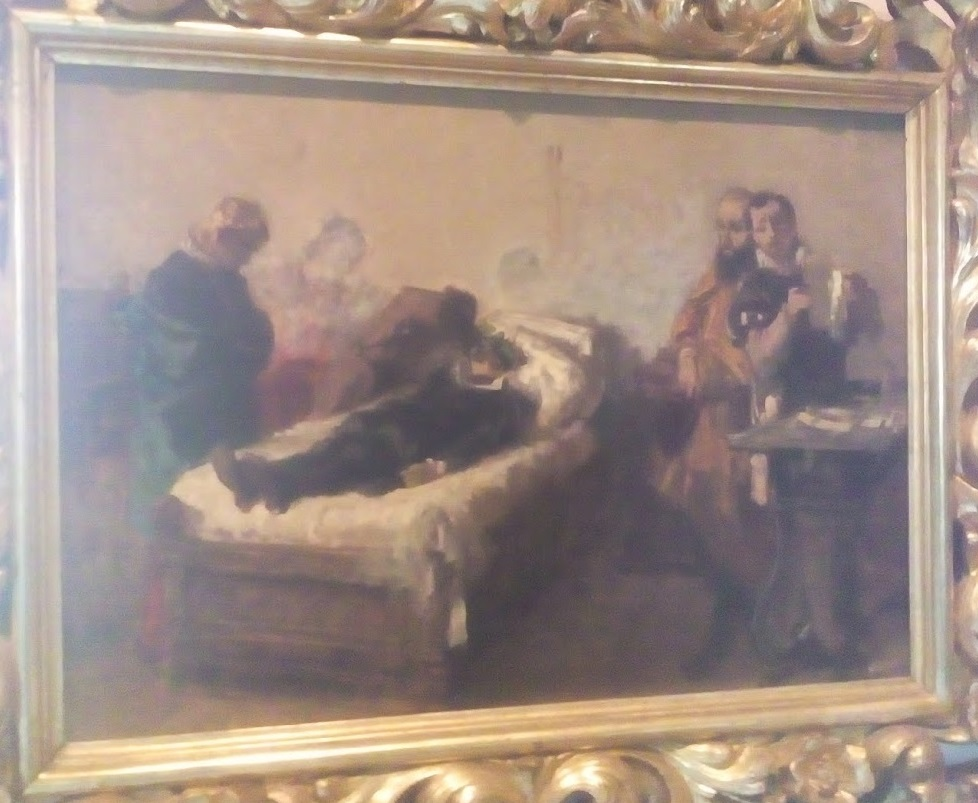
Domenico Morelli - The Death of Tasso

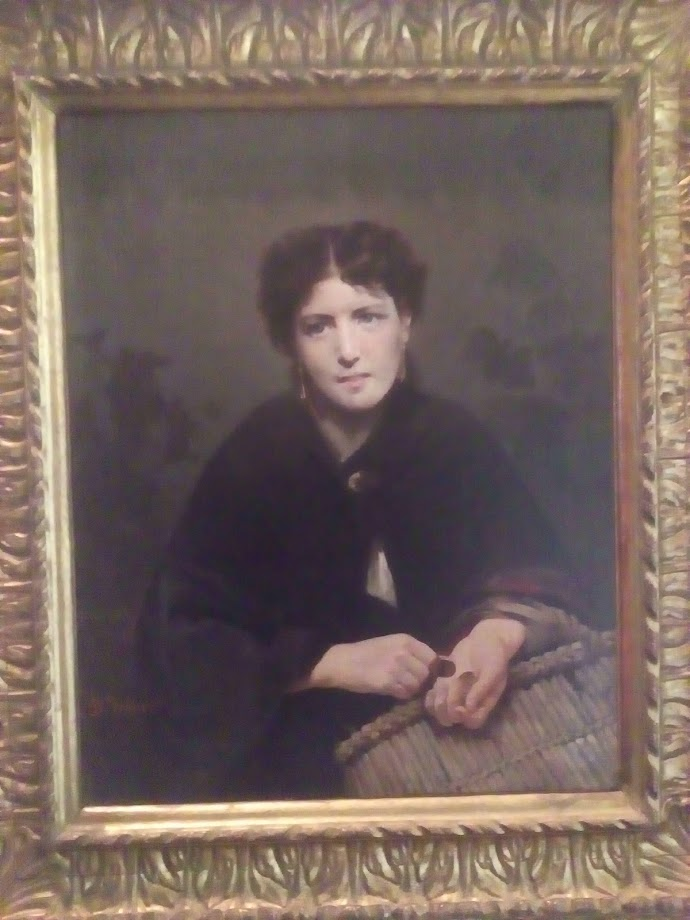
Girolamo Induno - Woman Cooking

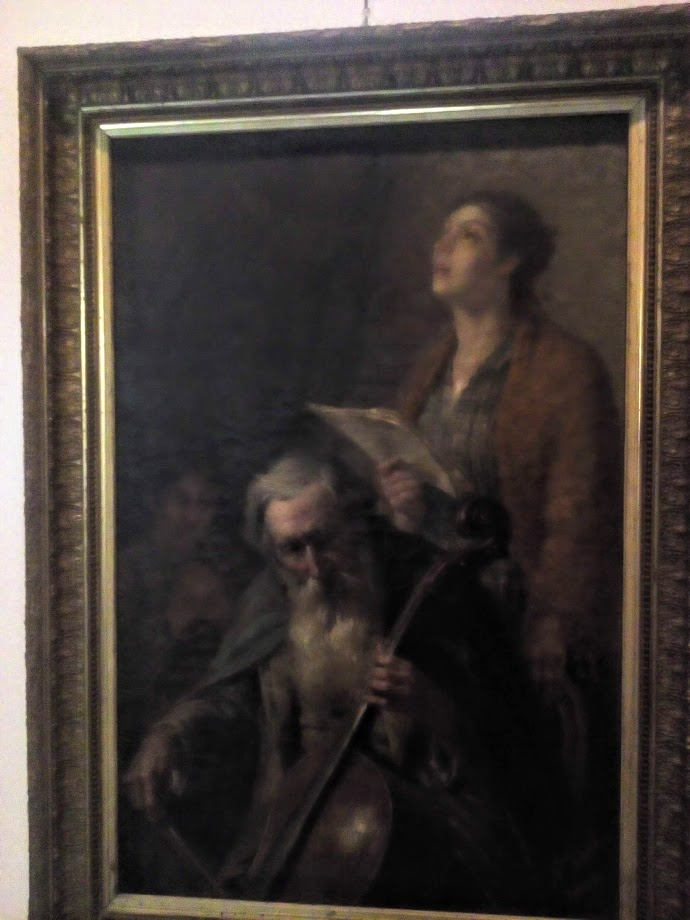
Alessandro Abate - Forced music

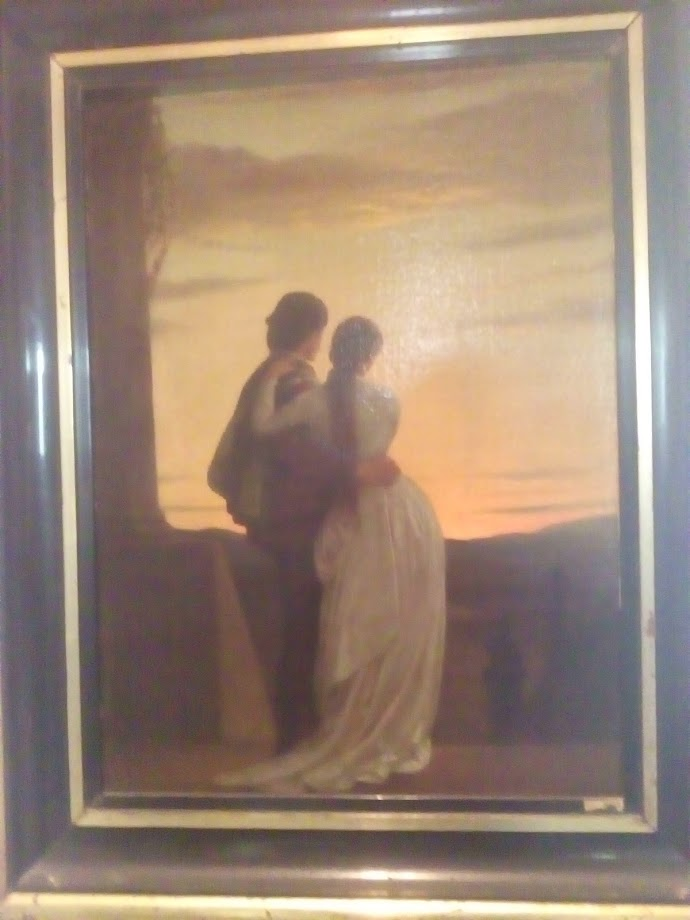
Michele Rapisardi - Happy Hours

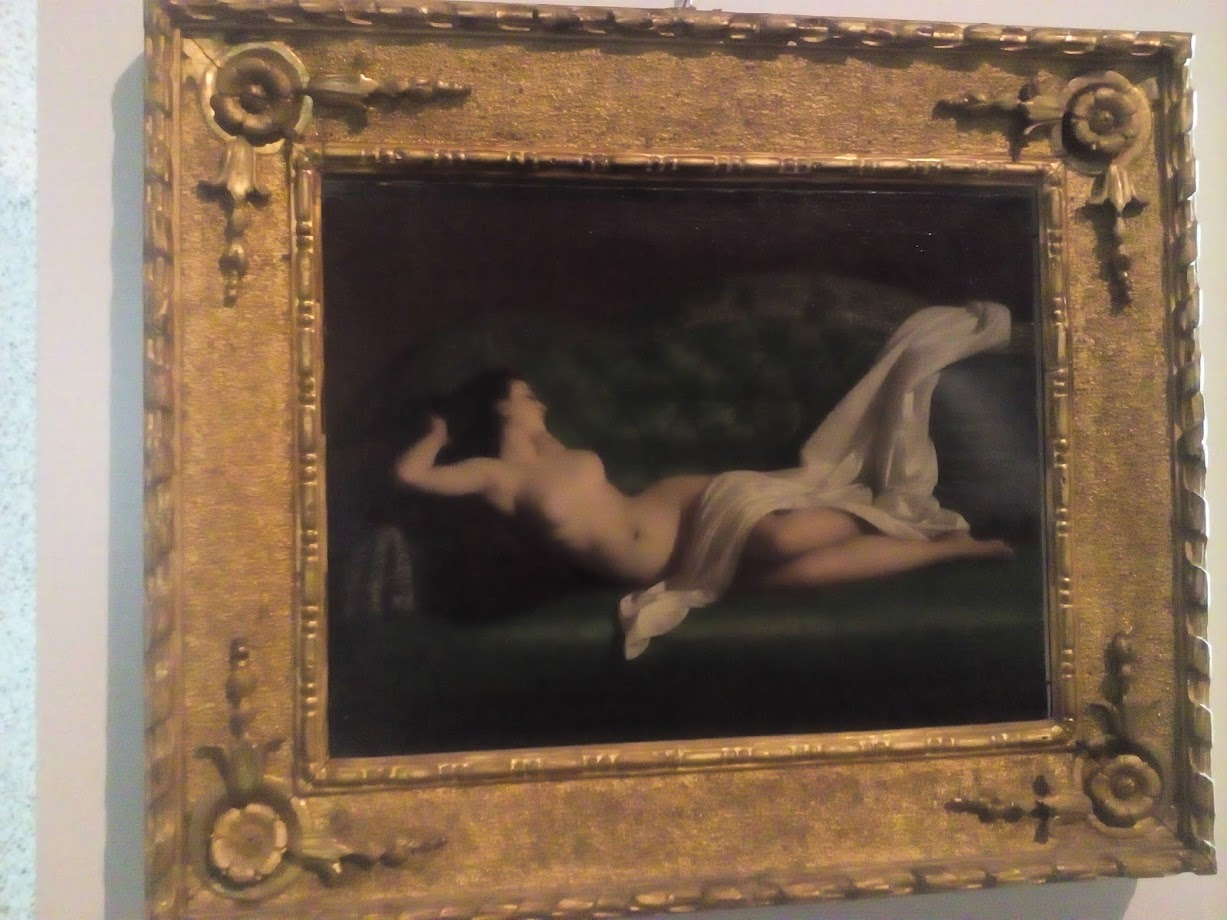
Michele Rapisardi - Venus on a Green Couch

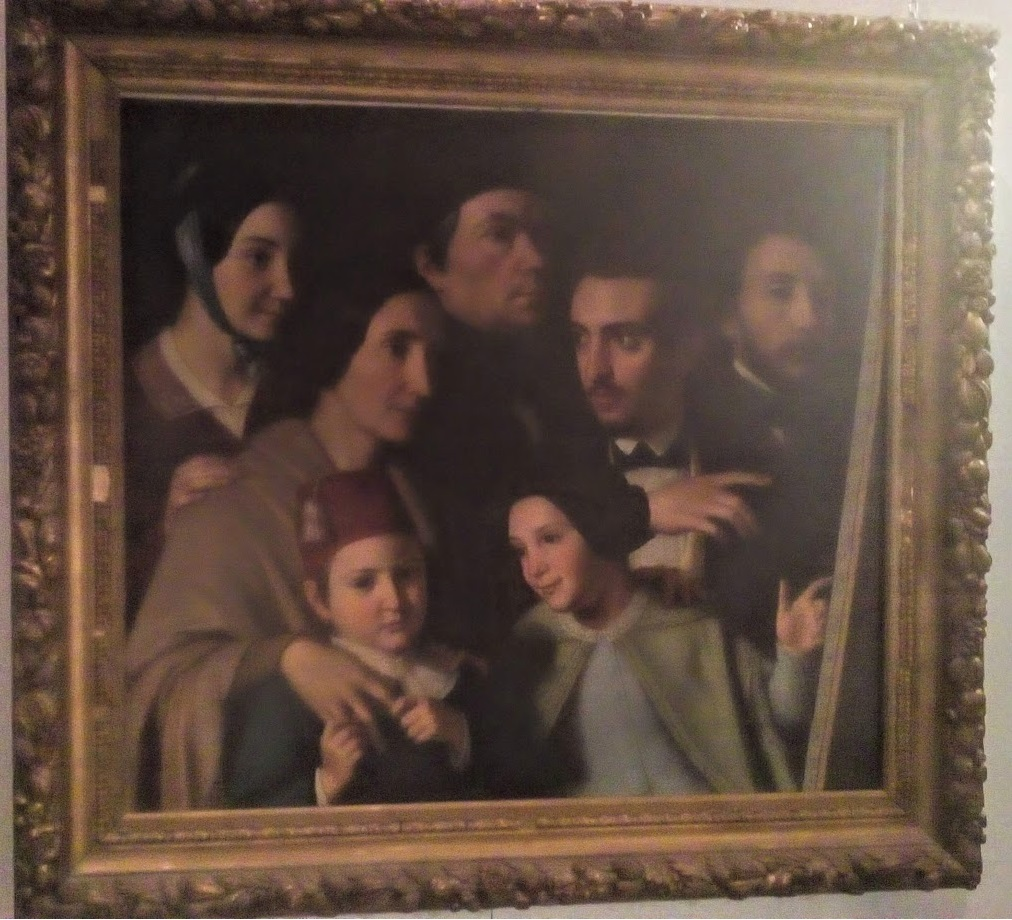
Giuseppe Rapisardi - Family Portrait

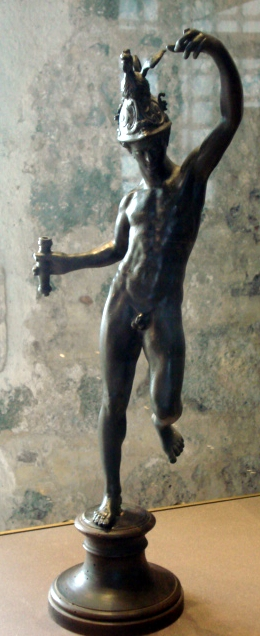
Perseus (16th century)

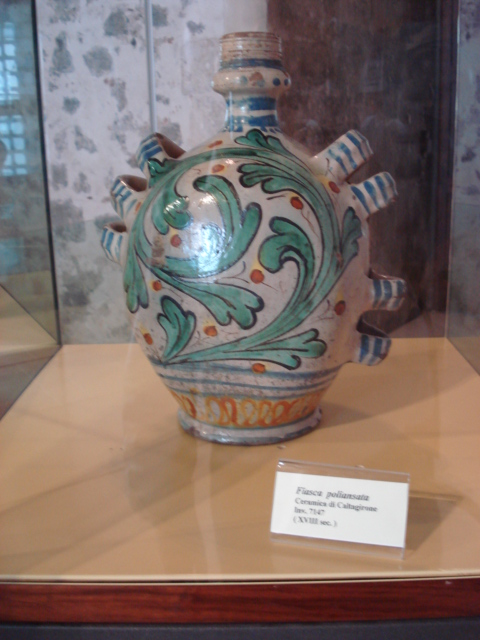
Caltagirone ceramic, 18th century

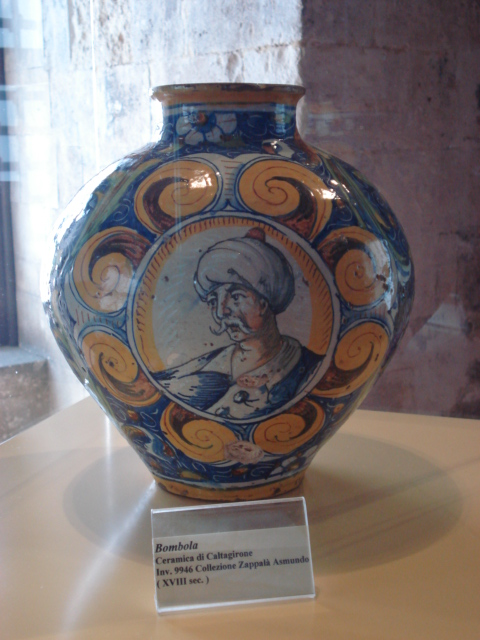
Caltagirone ceramic, 18th century

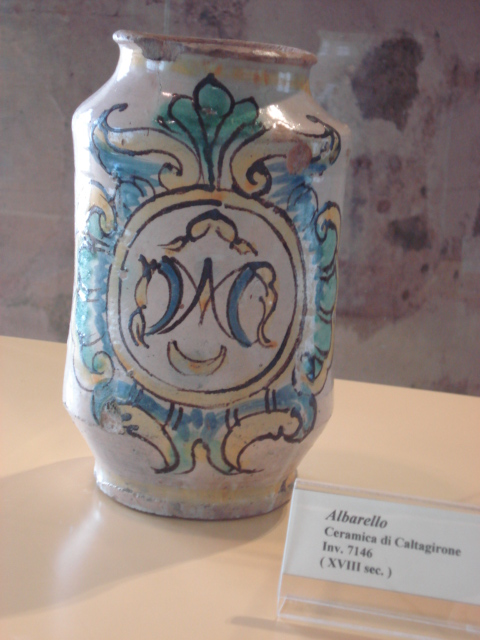
Caltagirone ceramic, 18th century

==== Open space ====
This large room houses temporary exhibitions as well as sculptures, bas-reliefs, inscriptions from Certosa di Nuovaluce and an urn by the Gaginian school. A room beside it houses some of the numismatic collection and the whole Fondo Sebastiano Ittar, including engravings by Ittar showing studies of monuments and works of art in Catania.
