= Antonino (name) =

Male given name

Antonino is an Italian masculine given name that is a form of Antonio, as well as a surname. Below is a list of notable people with the name.

== Given name ==
- Antonino Accardo, American mafia boss
- Antonino Arconte (born 1954), Italian writer and former secret agent
- Antonino Asta (born 1970), Italian footballer and manager
- Antonino Barges (fl. 1546–1565), Franco-Flemish composer of the Renaissance, active in Venice and Treviso
- Antonino Barillà (born 1988), Italian footballer
- Antonino Barillà (sport shooter) (born 1987), Italian sports shooter
- Antonino Bernardini, (born 1974) Italian footballer and manager
- Antonino Bonaccorsi (1826–1897), Italian painter
- Antonino Bonvissuto (born 1985), Italian footballer
- Antonino Borzì (1852–1921), Italian botanist
- Antonino Bruschetta (born 1962), Italian actor, film and stage director, and screenwriter.
- Antonino Calcagnadoro (1876–1935), Italian painter
- Antonino Calderone (1935–2013), Sicilian Mafioso
- Antonino Caltabiano (born 1955), Italian wrestler
- Antonino Caponnetto (1920–2002), Italian Antimafia magistrate
- Antonino Cardillo (born 1975), Italian architect
- Antonino Cassarà (1947–1985), Italian policeman assassinated by the Cosa Nostra
- Antonino Catalano (1932–1987), Italian racing cyclist
- Antonino Cayetano (born 1979) Mexican politician
- Antonino da Patti (16th century), Sicilian priest
- Antonino D'Agata (1882–1947), Italian politician
- Antonino D'Agostino (born 1978), Italian footballer
- Antonino D'Antona (1842–1913), Italian physician and politician
- Antonino Daì (born 1984), Italian footballer
- Antonino D'Ambrosio (born 1971), American author and filmmaker
- Antonino de Bivona-Bernardi (c. 1774–1837), Sicilian botanist, bryologist and phycologist
- Antonino de Forciglioni (1389–1459), Roman Catholic Archbishop of Florence and saint
- Antonino De Rosa (born 1981), American Magic: The Gathering player
- Antonino Diana (c. 1586–1663), Sicilian Catholic moral theologian
- Antonino Dos Santos Baptista (1933–2013), Portuguese professional racing cyclist
- Antonino Faà di Bruno (1910–1981), Italian actor and former military officer
- Antonino Fernández Rodríguez (1917–2016), Spanish businessman
- Antonino Fogliani (1976–2026), Italian conductor
- Antonino Foti (born 1962), Italian softball coach
- Antonino Gandolfo (1841–1910), Italian painter
- Antonino Gandolfo Brancaleone (1820–1888), Italian composer
- Antonino Giuffrè (born 1945), Italian mafioso
- Antonino Grano (1660–1718), Italian painter and engraver
- Antonino Isordia (born 1973), Mexican film and documentary director
- Antonino La Gumina (born 1996), Italian footballer
- Antonino Leto (1844–1913), Italian painter
- Antonino Lo Surdo (1880–1949), Italian physicist
- Antonino Paone (born 1955), Italian-American actor
- Antonino Parrinello (born 1988), Italian cyclist
- Antonino Paternò Castello, Marchese di San Giuliano (1852–1914), Italian diplomat
- Antonino Profeta (born 1988), Italian footballer
- Antonino Ragusa (born 1990), Italian footballer
- Antonino Raspanti (born 1959), Italian Roman Catholic bishop
- Antonino Riccardo Luciani (1931–2020), Italian classical composer
- Antonino Rocca (1921–1977), Italian-Argentinian professional wrestler
- Antonino Rocchetti Torres (1851–1934), Italian painter
- Antonino P. Roman (1939–2014), Filipino politician
- Antonino Russo Giusti (1876–1957), Italian dramatist
- Antonino Sabino (1591–1650), Italian composer and priest
- Antonino Saetta (1922–1988), Italian magistrate, assassinated by Cosa Nostra together with his son Stefano.
- Antonino Saviano (born 1984), Italian footballer
- Antonino Scopelliti (1935–1991), Italian magistrate killed by the Mafia
- Antonino Souza-Kordyeru (born 1993), Russian pair skater
- Antonino Spadaccino (born 1983), Italian singer
- Antonino Maria Stromillo (1786–1858), Italian Roman Catholic bishop
- Antonino Terzo (1923–2005), Italian actor
- Antonino Toscano (1883–1941), Italian admiral during World War II
- Antonino Tringali-Casanova (1888–1943), Italian politician, Minister of Justice of the Italian Social Republic
- Antonino Votto (1896–1985), Italian operatic conductor and vocal coach
- Antonino Zichichi (1929–2026), Italian physicist

== Surname ==
- Darlene Antonino-Custodio (born 1973), Filipina politician
- Luwalhati Antonino (1943–2023), Filipina politician
- Magnolia Antonino (1915–2010), Filipina politician

== See also ==
- Antonino (disambiguation)
- Antoniano (disambiguation)
- Antonijo
- Antonin (name)
- Antonina (name)
- Antonine (name)
- Antonini (name)
- Antoninho (name)
- Antoninów (disambiguation)
- Antoniny (disambiguation)
- Antonio
- Antoñito (name)
