= Antonino Gandolfo =

Italian painter

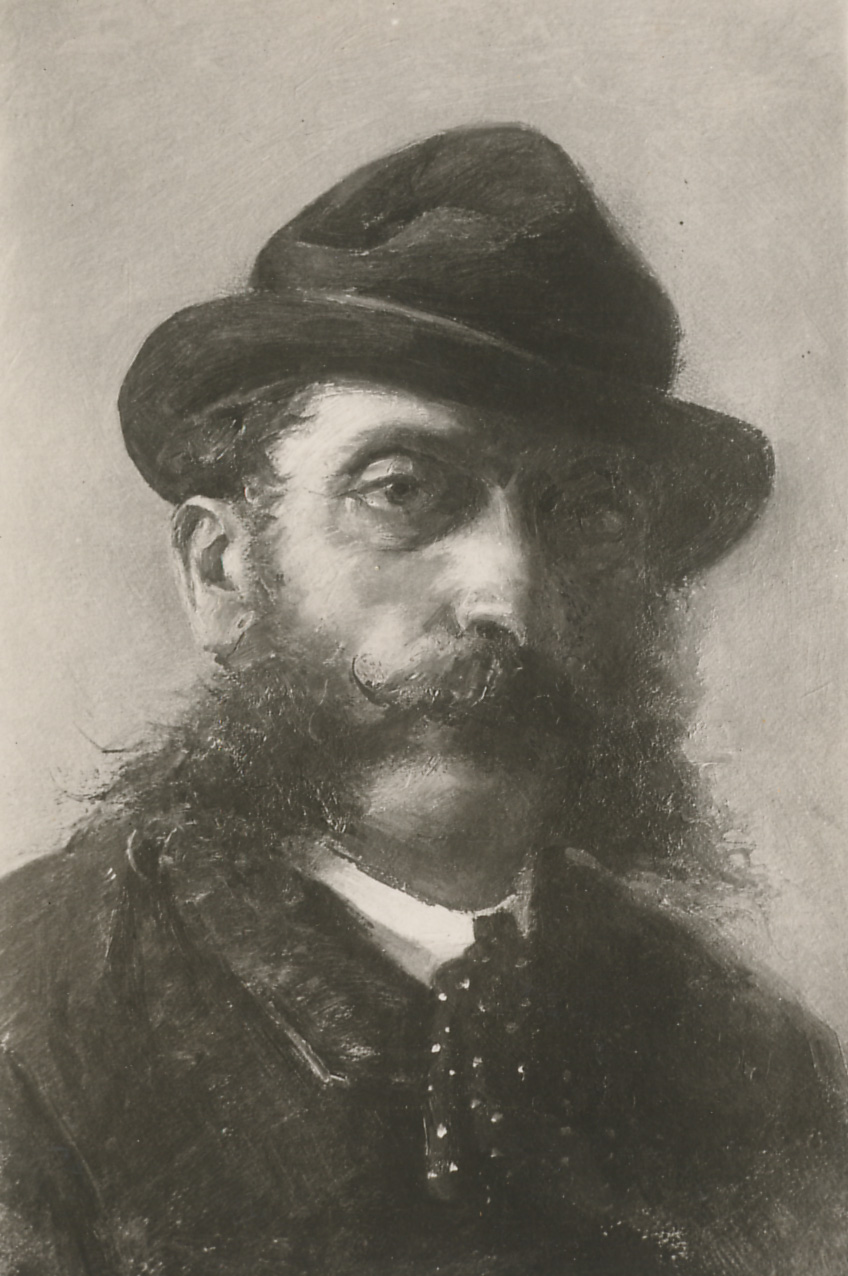
- Self portrait, 1890
- Born: Antonino Gandolfo; 28 October 1841; Catania, Kingdom of the Two Sicilies
- Died: 21 March 1910 (aged 68); Catania, Italy
- Known for: Painting
- Movement: Realism

Antonino Gandolfo (28 October 1841– 21 March 1910) was an Italian painter.

== Biography ==
=== Early years ===
Antonino Gandolfo was born in Catania on 28 October 1841. He was Giovanni Verga’s cousin and would become a friend of Mario Rapisardi, Luigi Capuana and Federico De Roberto. Together with the engraver Francesco Di Bartolo and the painters Natale Attanasio, Calcedonio Reina and Giuseppe Sciuti, he would contribute to the development of art in Catania in the second half of 19th century. The young Antonino came from a family that already had some prominent personalities. His uncle Giuseppe Gandolfo, in the first half of the century, was the most important portrait painter of Eastern Sicily and served to inspire new artists. Another uncle, Francesco, had studied medicine in Florence and Paris and was a friend of the historian Carlo Giuseppe Guglielmo Botta and the dramatist Giovanni Battista Niccolini. His cousin Antonino Gandolfo Brancaleone was a well known and esteemed composer in the Kingdom of the Two Sicilies, and was the author of several successful music dramas. Antonino spent his childhood among the olive trees and prickly pears of his father’s countryside and the paintbrushes of his uncle Giuseppe who influenced his artistic nature and who was his first teacher.

=== In Florence (1860-61) ===
In 1855, when Antonino was only 14 years old, his uncle died, but that early artistic relationship had made him fall so much in love with painting that Antonino decided to continue his studies in Florence, which was overflowing with ancient and modern arts and was also where his uncle had educated himself. He went there in 1860, at the age of 19. In Florence, there was not only painting but also literature and here Antonino got to know and struck up a friendship with Giosuè Carducci. In Florence, he attended mainly the studio of Stefano Ussi, creator of the famous painting The Expulsion of the Duke of Athens, whose paintings were still connected to the academism of that period and had not been by the new artistic movement of that time: the Macchiaioli. However, in 1861, the young Antonino participated in an exhibition where "The Thirteen" protested against the strictures of the academic rules.

Also in 1861, Gandolfo did a painting, now lost, titled the Triumph of Italy that was inspired by country's recent independence. It resulted in his discovery as an artist. The picture was seen and appreciated by King Vittorio Emanuele II who, impressed with the talent of the young artist, wanted to pose for him, receiving a portrait painted extemporaneously in pen and ink. The king also offered him a government pension that Gandolfo refused. Giosuè Carducci also noticed the artistic qualities of Gandolfo and became an important friend. Thus, at the end of 1861 when the young artist returned to Catania, Carducci wrote to him: "If you go in the new season to Florence for studies and you remain there, I will easily have the pleasure to see you again next summer: a pleasure that I eagerly hasten with my thought. Meanwhile, remember me, and if I can help you with something, please do take advantage ".

=== Return to Catania ===
Towards the end of the 1860s Antonino fell in love with Giovanna (Vannina) Mangione, a poetry enthusiast. The engagement was stormy due to his almost morbid attachment to Vannina. On the first of July 1870, Antonino married her but the marriage did not last. The year after, their first son Luigi was born. By tradition he was given the name of his grandfather on his father's side. The child rendered the marriage more problematic, because Vannina was showing the same sort of attachment towards the child that Antonino showed towards her. Obviously unstable, she committed suicide by swallowing sulphuric acid, after a quarrel with her husband, in January 1874. Luigi died the year after, age four, from diphtheria.

It isn't known if Gandolfo painted in the period between the death of his wife and 1879–80. The first painting after this period which has survived is Temptation (La tentazione), a large canvas depicting a poor woman who is forced to accept the money offered to her by a young man for nefarious purposes; below, on the right-hand side, her mother watches impassively, with resignation. The three figures are clearly recognizable: Maria Grancagnolo, who would become Antonino's second wife, her brother, Salvatore and Anna Consoli, their mother. Temptation marks the beginning of Gandolfo's works of "Social Realism"; a series that he would continue into the 1890s. (Maria, together with her elder sister, Agata, came to live in his house at Rocca del Vento street 22 in Catania around 1874–75, originally to care for Gandolfo's little son and do the housework. Maria immediately started to appear on the canvases of the artist as his principle female model and would subsequently be the subject of many portraits and sketches).

This style of painting was certainly not originated by Gandolfo, as romantic and realist painters like Corot and Courbet, also had an eye for painting humble workers and peasants. Gandolfo was also influenced by the novels of Victor Hugo and Eugène Sue. It is very possible that the new Verist literature, using local themes, events of common life and stories of the everyday misery of the most humble classes, had offered to the painter new unexplored themes. Thus, while Gandolfo (between 1880 and 1885) was painting The expelled woman (L’Espulsa), The last coin (L’Ultima moneta), The woman usurer (L’Usuraia), Forced Music (Musica Forzata), Proletarians (I proletari), On the way (Per Via) and The blind woman (La cieca), the literary world produced Rapisardi's Job (Giobbe), Verga's The House by the Medlar Tree (I Malavoglia) and Capuana's Giacinta. His friendship with Rapisardi was rich in meetings and conversations, that took place in the house of the latter, at Etnea street, where literature and artistic projects were discussed, as well as many other topics.

Early in the 1880s, Verga started an affair with Rapisardi's wife, Giselda Fojanesi. Gandolfo, on that occasion, was very critical towards the "cousin Giovanni" – as Verga was referred to in Gandolfo's family – preferring not to meet him, even when he came looking for him at home.

In March 1886 he gave his friend Rapisardi a canvas entitled The crying girl (La ragazza piangente), that the poet liked very much and thus thanked him:

"To the work that you, with completely royal generosity, wanted to give me as a gift, I have assigned the place of honor in the small living room and on the easel that you know. You can not imagine how happy I am. It is really a masterpiece, both for the delicate and passionate figure and for the strange and powerful originality of the painting. One of these days I will come to thank you personally. Meanwhile, you should know that my gratitude is equal to my admiration."

In 1888 his second son, also named Luigi, was born. He and Maria married in 1891 and their marriage was long-lasting and happy.

=== Portraits ===
Gandolfo became a prolific portraitist. Among his subjects were the painter Filippo Liardo, to whom he would dedicate various portraits, Rapisardi, and professors such as Giuseppe Zurria and Salvatore Tomaselli, but also the poor, the peasants, and the natural beauties of the local villages.

In those years the friendship between the painter and his literary friends intensified: often Antonino would get them together in his country house in Cannizzaro, where he possessed a large piece of land inherited from his father. His distinguished guests came by the train that left at 10 a.m. from nearby Catania and would arrive in time to have lunch together. We know for certain that Nino Martoglio participated in those meetings and kept the company cheerful, to the point that the tenor Giulio Crimi laughed so hard he popped the buttons off his collar. Regular visitors included Liardo, Rapisardi, Capuana, Verga and Federico De Roberto who, according to photographic evidence, continued to visit Gandolfo's son long after the death of the painter.

In 1901, the municipality of Catania, commissioned portraits of King Vittorio Emanuele III and Queen Elena, for the amount of one thousand and four hundred liras. However, a year later, when Gandolfo delivered the paintings to Mayor Giuseppe De Felice Giuffrida, known for his anti-monarchic opinions, they were set aside. When Gandolfo asked him why, De Felice answered: "I appreciate the art of Master Gandolfo in the museum!!"

In 1894, Francesco, his second son, was born. In 1902 another son, Antonino, was born. Antonino Junior was a prominent writer in Catania in the 1930s.

=== The Second Agricultural Exposition of Catania ===
In 1904, officials in Catania began preparing for a major agricultural exhibition, an important part of which was to be dedicated to art. For the occasion, an extensive excavations of lava stone began in the place where the Exposition square would later be located. The work took longer than expected and the event was postponed until 1907. Gandolfo was appointed to the Organizing Commission for the exhibition of fine arts and photography for Sicily, of which he became the Vice President. The exhibition had a great success and the critics were particularly enthusiastic towards Gandolfo. Capuana wrote: "The works of Antonino Gandolfo, from picture to portrait, from half-length portraits to drawing exercises, show the persistence of attempts, of research, the great variety of inspiration that contributed to the development of his artistic talent"; and De Roberto went even further:

"To this noble anxiety, to this painful vibration in front of the sight of poverty and pain, and to the mastery of the technique in reproducing the human form in what it has as most expressive, in the face, Gandolfo often adds another quality of his own: a style, a teaching ability, a mystery by virtue of which some of his pictorial episodes of ambiguous significance, suggestive as music, seem detached from some ancient canvases by old glorious masters".

Gandolfo died suddenly of a heart ailment on 21 March 1910.

== Gallery ==
=== Social Realism ===
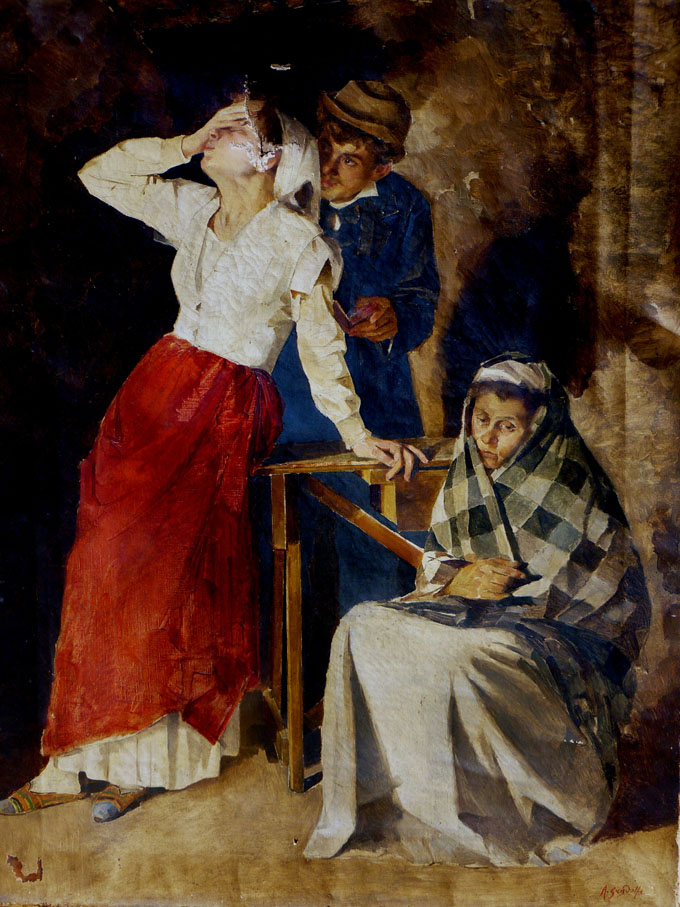
Temptation (La tentazione),1880

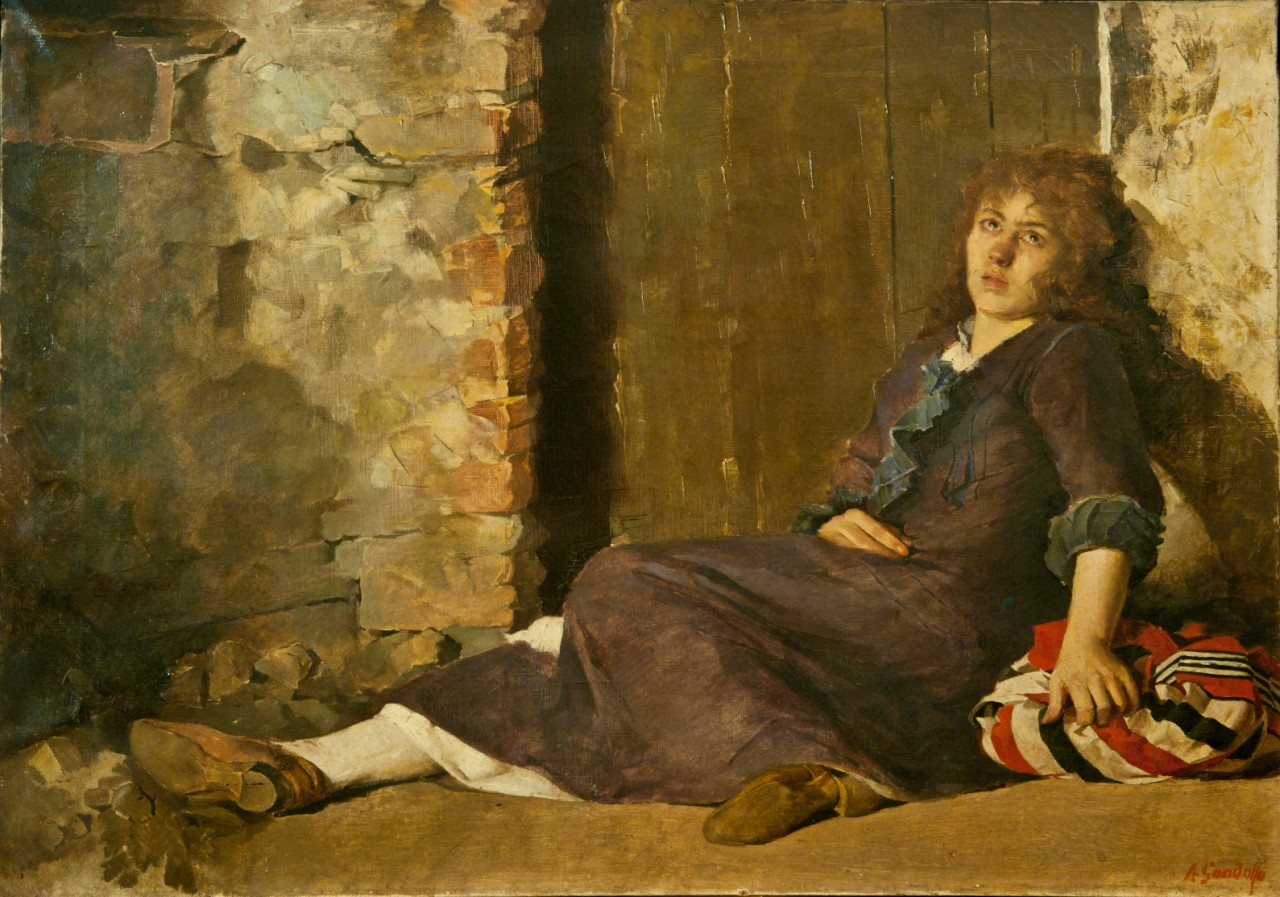
The expelled woman (L'espulsa), 1880

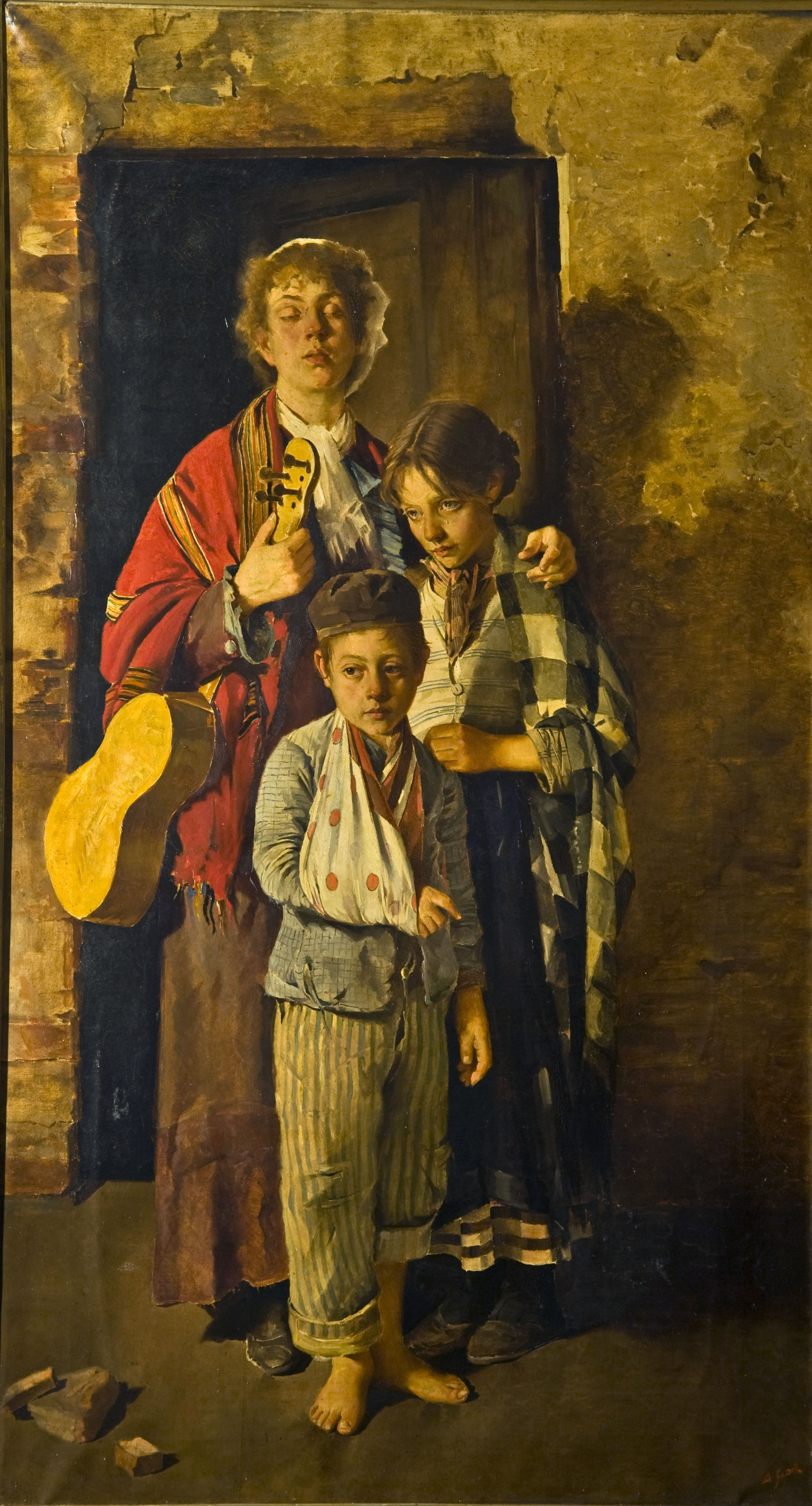
Forced music (Musica forzata), 1880

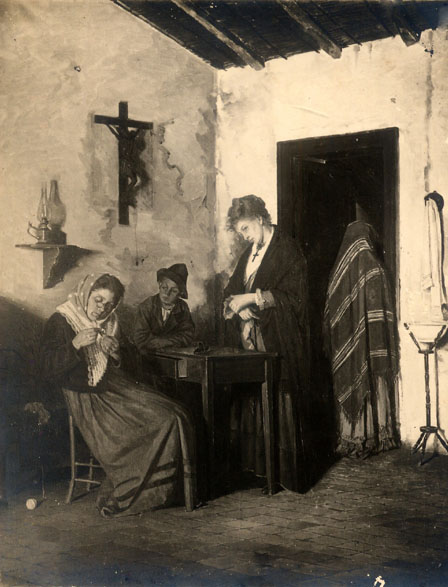
The usurer woman (L'Usuraia). 1880

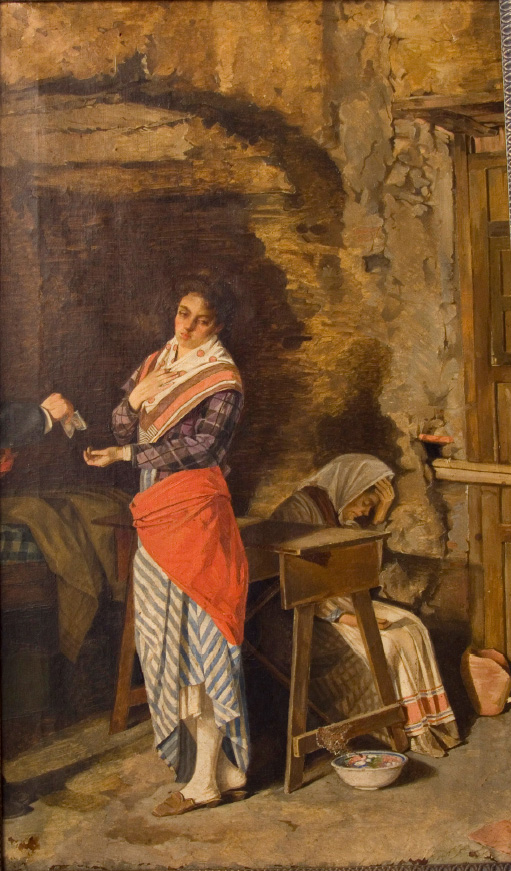
Remuneration (Il compenso), 1880-1883

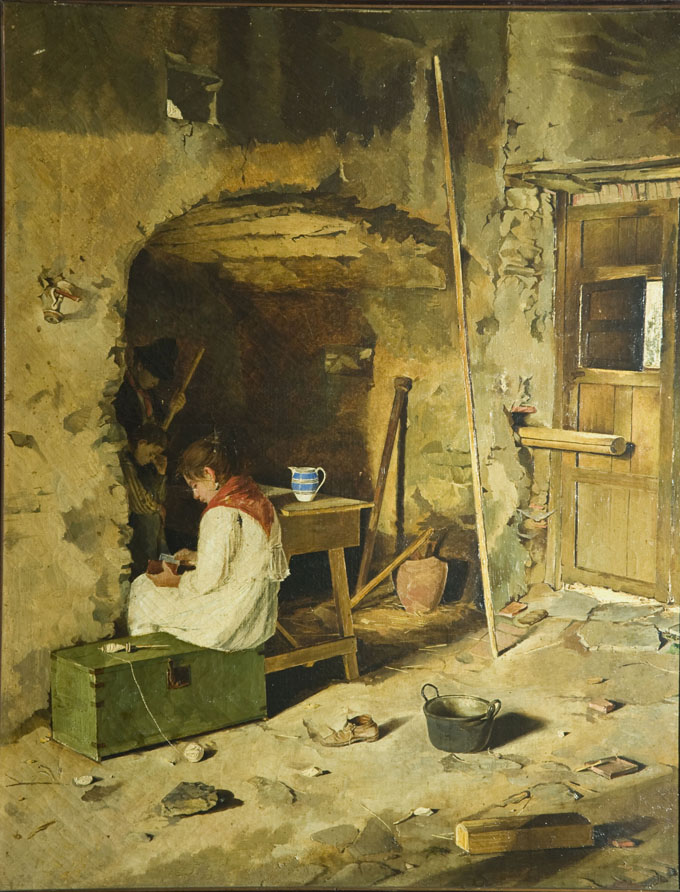
The last coin (L'ultima moneta). Ca. 1880-83

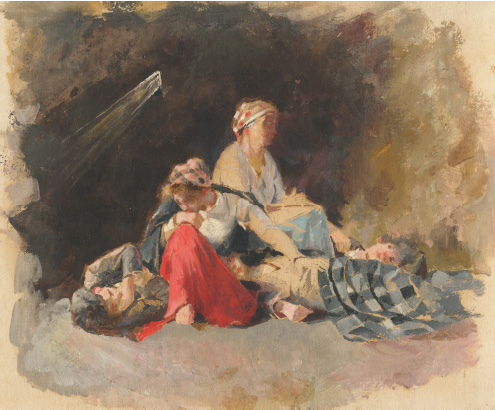
Sketch for Proletarians (Bozzetto per I Proletari). Ca. 1880-85

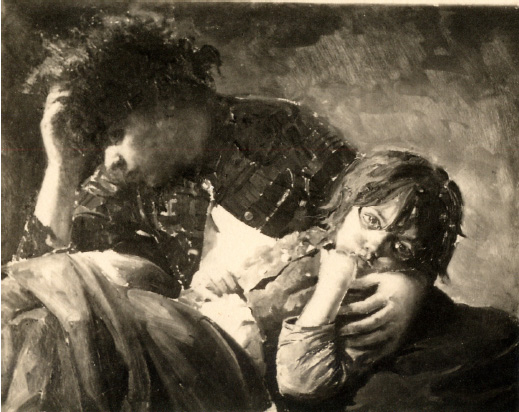
On the way (Per Via). Ca. 1885

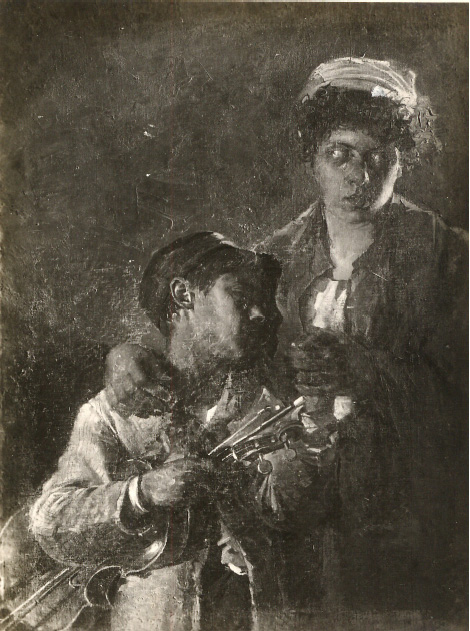
The blind woman (La Cieca). Ca.1885

=== Portraits ===
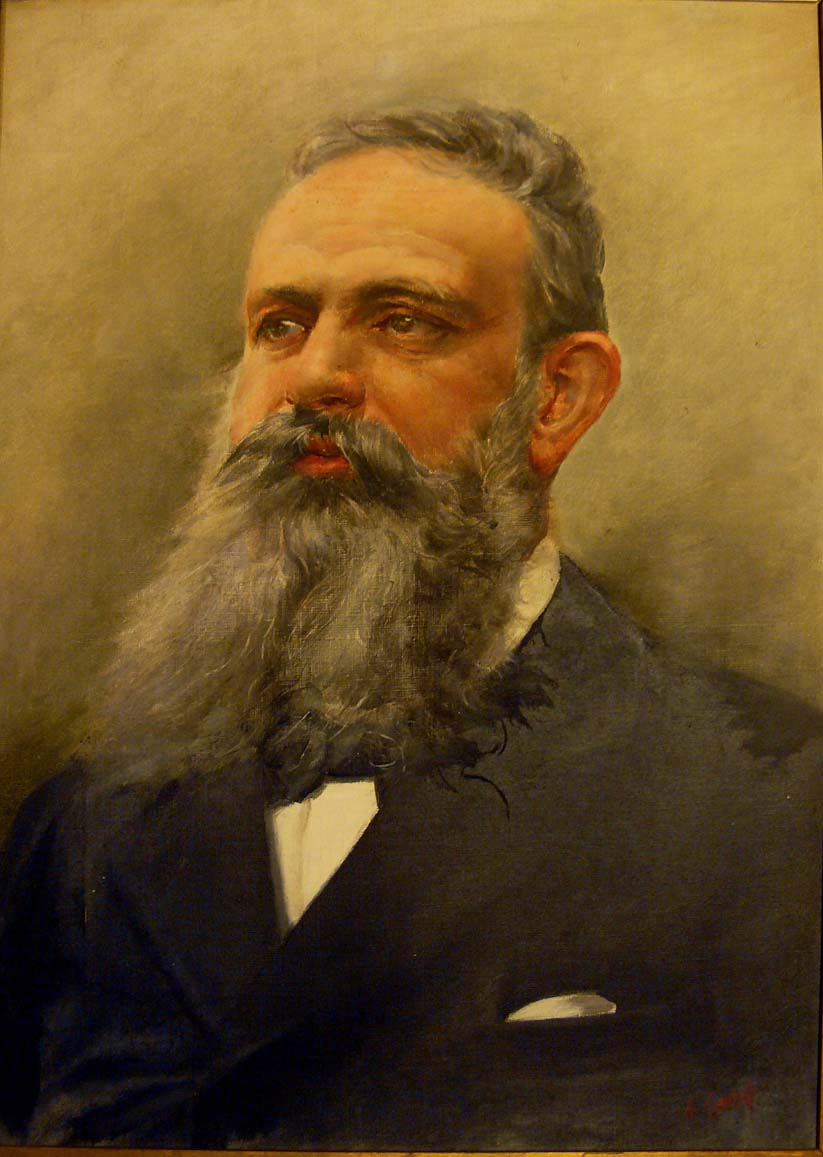
Felice Bisleri

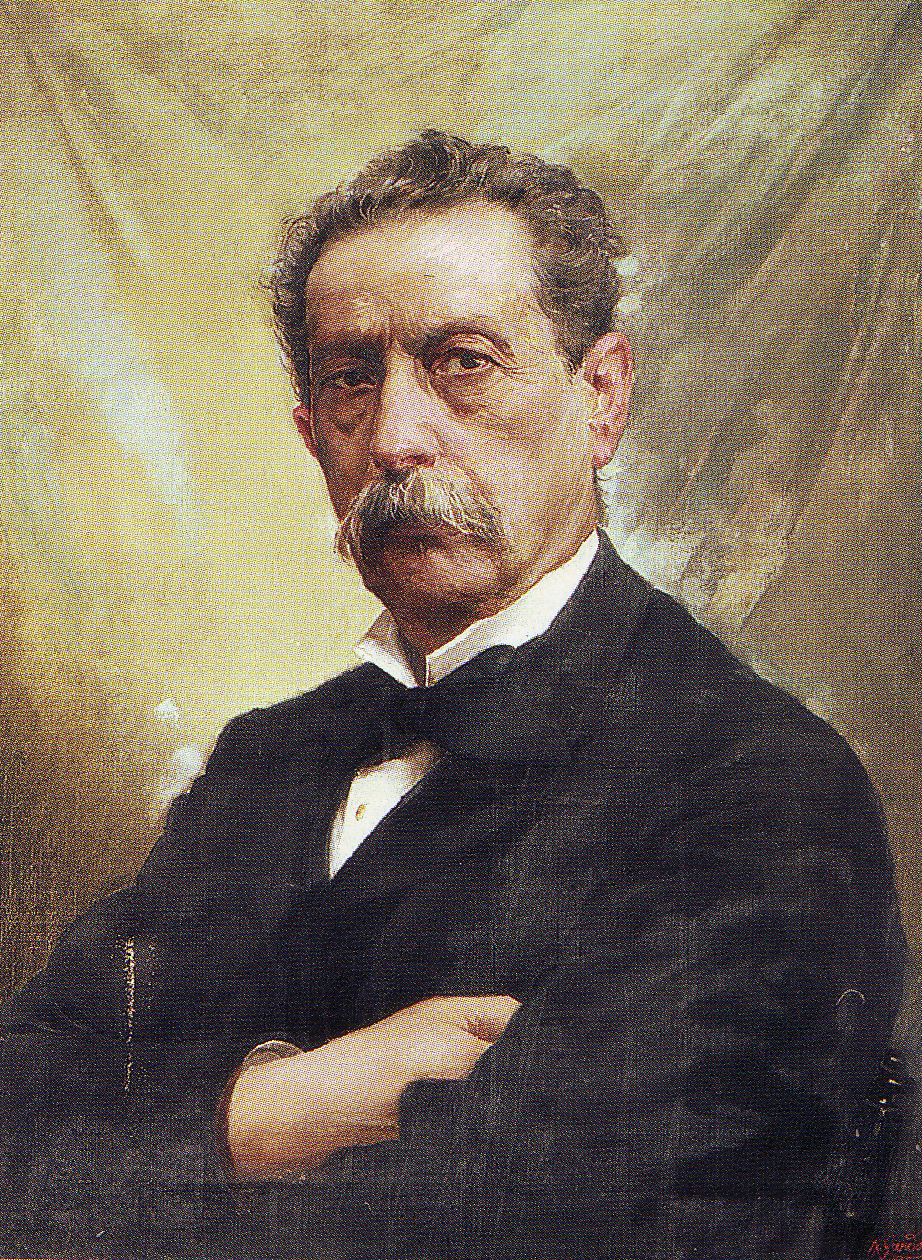
Salvatore Tomaselli

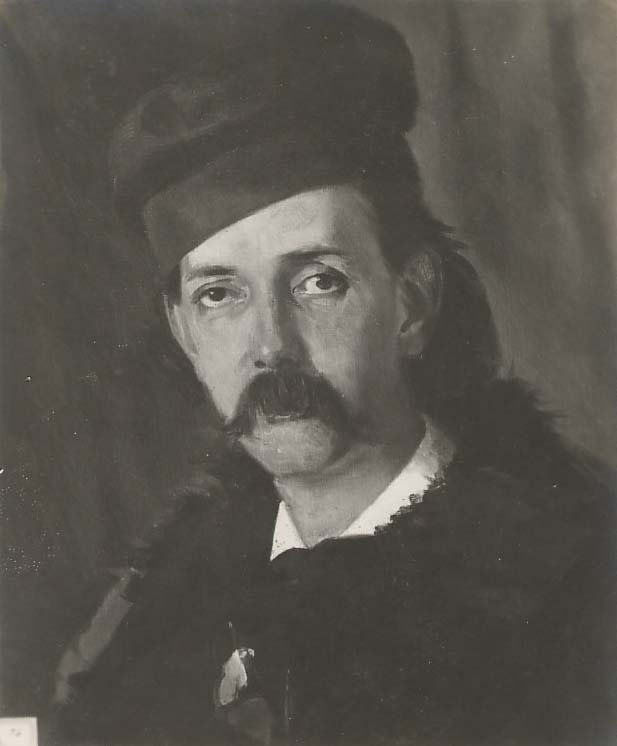
Mario Rapisardi

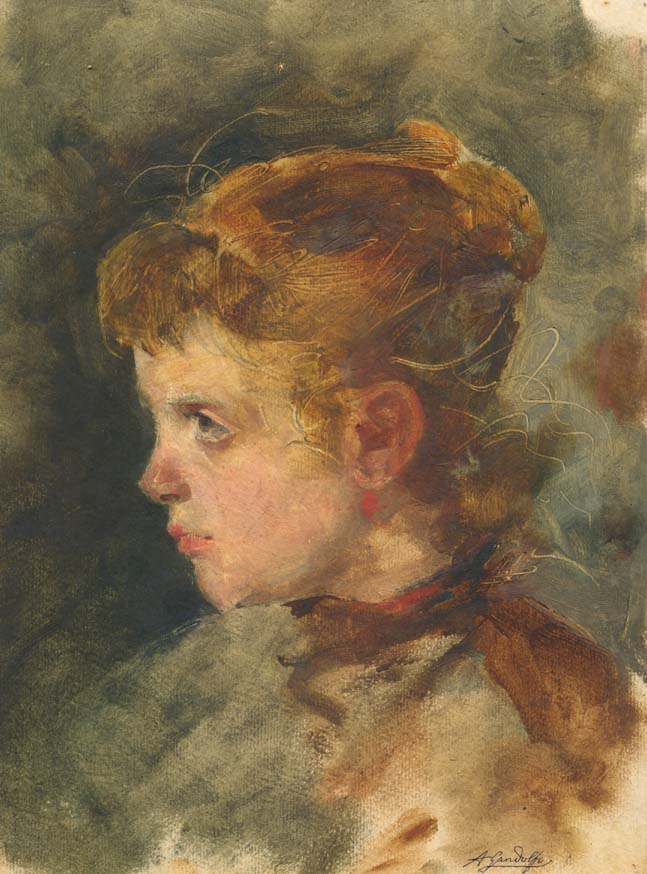
Baby's portrait (Ritratto di bimba)

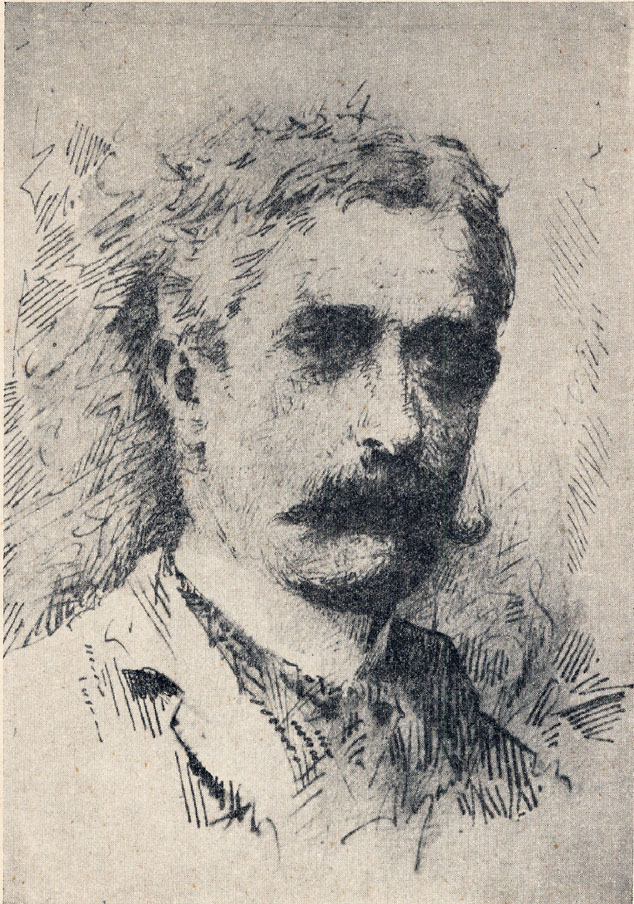
Giovanni Verga

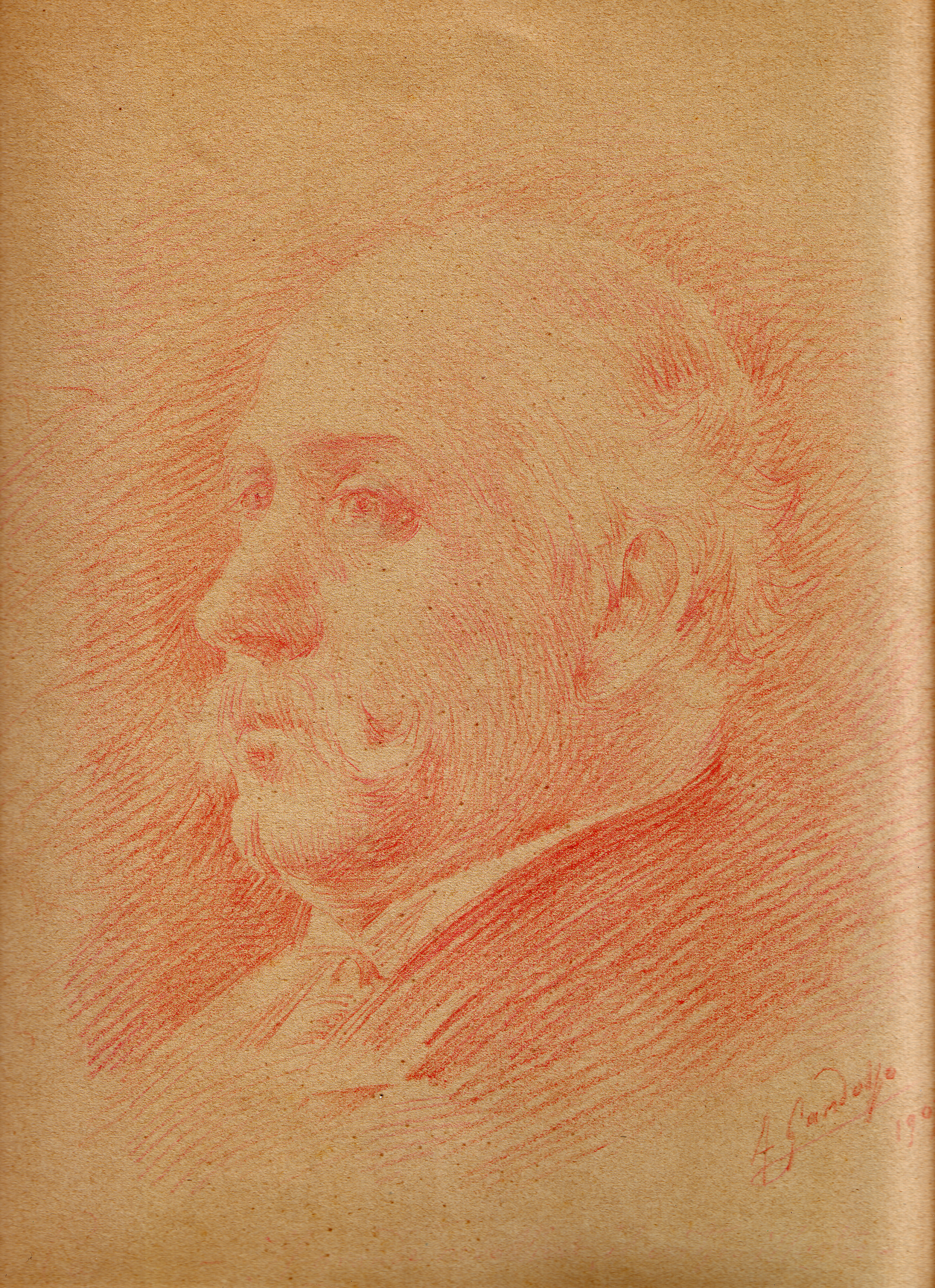
Luigi Capuana

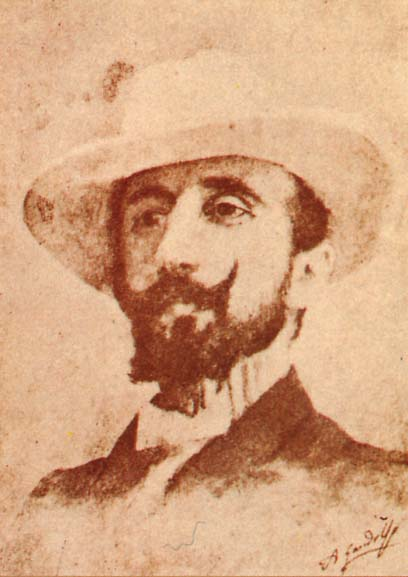
Nino Martoglio

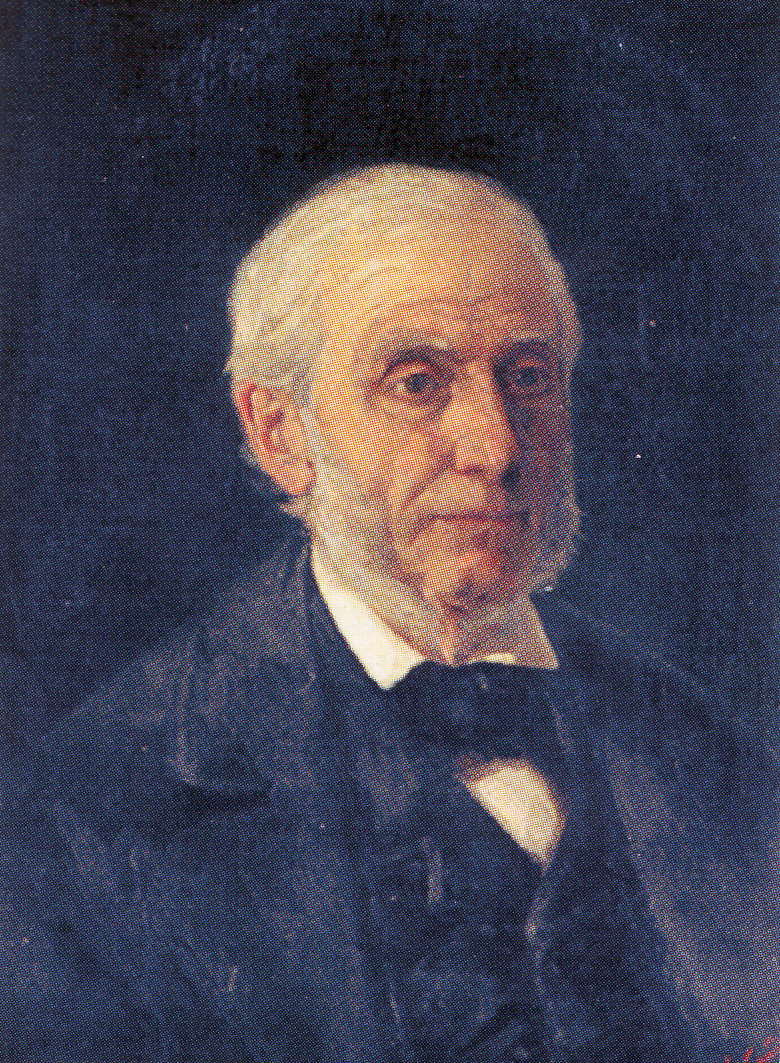
Giuseppe Zurria

== Sources ==
- Accascina, Maria (1939). Ottocento Siciliano. Pittura. Roma: Fratelli Palombi.
- Carducci, Giosue (1939). Lettere, vol II, Ad Antonino Gandolfo. Edizione Nazionale opere di Carducci. Bologna.
- Bénézit, E. (1966). Dictionnaire critique et documentaire de peintres, sculpteurs, dessinateurs et graveurs. Librairie Gründ.
- Damigella, Anna Maria (2006). Enciclopedia della Sicilia. Parma: Ricci Editore.
- D’Antoni, Angela (1967). L'ambiente letterario artistico dell'Ottocento catanese ed il pittore Antonino Gandolfo. Tesi di laurea. Università di Catania.
- De Roberto, Federico (1908). La mostra di belle arti. Albo illustrato sulla II Esposizione agricola siciliana. Catania: C. Galatola.
- Capuana, Luigi (1907). Il progresso della Sicilia nella Esposizione agricola. Quotidiano Il giornale d’Italia.
- Fiducia, Saverio (1955). Passeggiate sentimentali: Quadri di Antonino Gandolfo. Quotidiano La Sicilia.
- Sarullo, Luigi (1993). Dizionario degli artisti siciliani. Pittura. Edizioni Novecento.
- Blandini, Antonino (2011). "Gandolfo: il pittore gentiluomo". Agorà, n. 36, anno XII, aprile-giugno.
