= Cristaldi =

Cristaldi is a family name of Italian origin. It may refer to:

- Emanuelle Cristaldi, Italian actress and pornographic actress
- Franco Cristaldi, Italian film producer
- Pasquale Liotta Cristaldi, Italian painter
- Massimo Cristaldi, Italian film producer
