= Foti =

Foti is a surname. Notable people with the surname include:

- Adam Foti, Australian football player
- Antonino Foti, Italian sports coach
- Antonio Foti, Cypriot footballer
- Charles Foti, American jurist and Attorney General of Louisiana
- Pasquale Foti, Italian businessman
- Salvatore Foti, Italian footballer
- Samu Fóti, Hungarian gymnast
- Steven Foti, American politician

== See also ==
- Fo-ti, the herb Reynoutria multiflora
