= Antoninho =

Antoninho is a nickname, a diminute for Antonio in Portuguese. It may refer to:

- Antoninho (footballer, born 1921), Antônio Fernandes (1921–1973), Brazilian football midfielder and manager
- Antoninho (footballer, born 1939), Benedicto Antonio Angeli (1931–2021), Brazilian football forward and manager
- Antoninho (footballer, born 1942), Antônio da Silva (1942–2007), Brazilian football right winger
- Antoninho Muchanga, (b. 1965) Mozambican football forward
- Antoninho Travadinha, professional name of António Vicente Lopes (d. 1987), Cape Verdean musician

== See also ==
- Antonino (name)
