= Llamazares =

Llamazares may refer to:

- Antonino Isordia Llamazares (born 1973), Mexican filmmaker
- Gaspar Llamazares (born 1957), Spanish politician
- Julio Llamazares (born 1955), Spanish writer
