= Calcedonio =

Calcedonio is a masculine Italian given name. Notable people with the name include:

- Calcedonio Di Pisa (1931–1962), Italian mafioso
- Calcedonio Reina (1842–1911), Italian painter and poet
