= Rocchetti =

Rocchetti is an Italian surname. Notable people with the surname include:

- Antonino Rocchetti Torres (1851–1934), Italian painter
- Elisabetta Rocchetti (born 1975), Italian actress and director
- Federico Rocchetti (born 1986), Italian racing cyclist
- Manlio Rocchetti (1943–2017), Italian makeup artist
- Santino Rocchetti (born 1946), Italian singer-songwriter and musician
