= Paone =

Paone is a surname. Notable people with the surname include:

- Alene Paone, American publisher
- Antonino Paone (born 1955), Italian-American actor
- Martin P. Paone (born 1951), U.S. Senate employee
- Nando Paone (born 1956), Italian actor
- Nicola Paone (1915–2003), Italian-American singer, songwriter and restaurateur
- Remigio Paone (1899–1977), Italian theatre producer
