= Antonino de Bivona-Bernardi =

Sicilian botanist, bryologist and phycologist

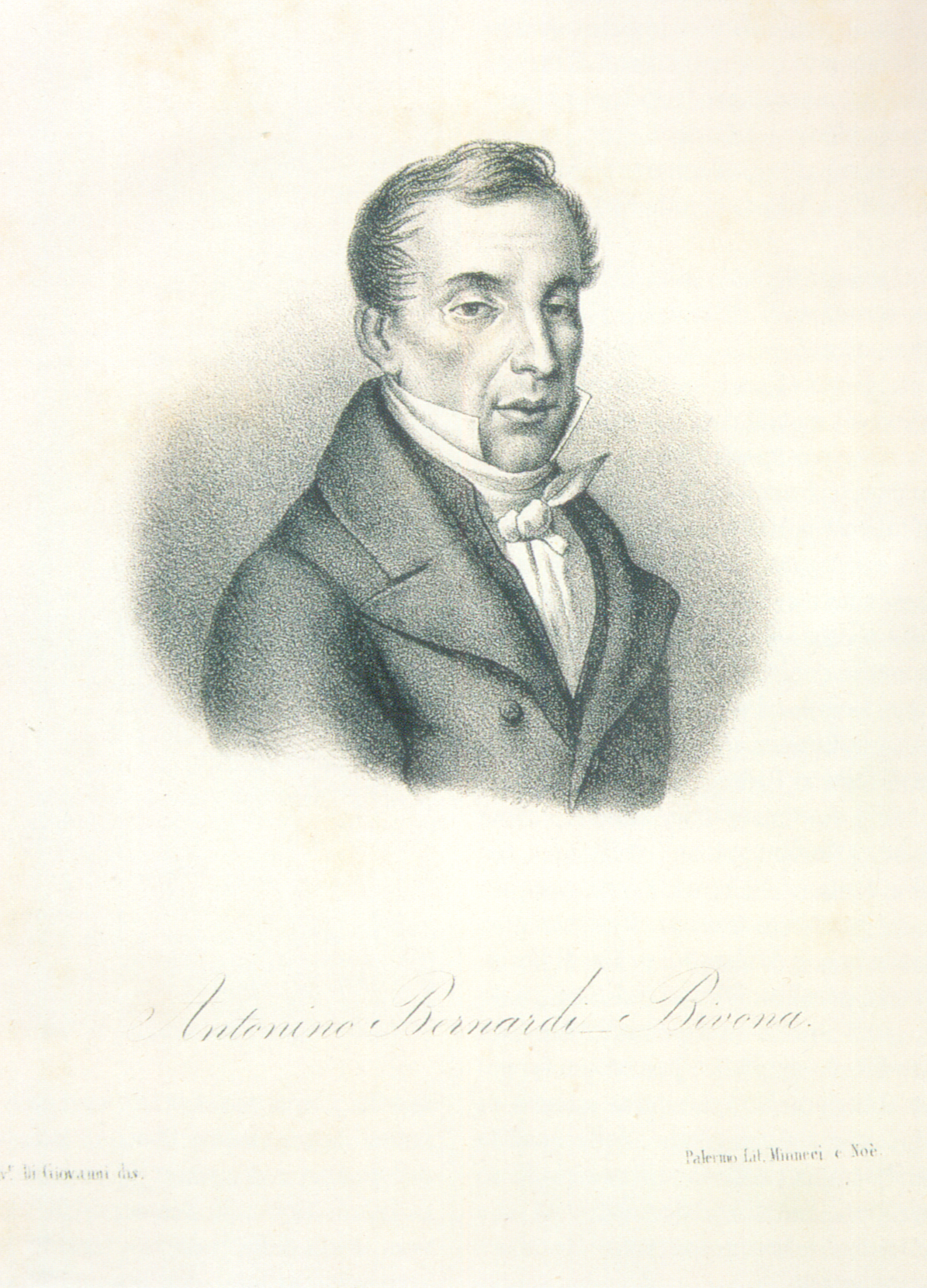
- Born: 1774 or 1778; Messina, Kingdom of Sicily
- Died: 1837 (aged 62–63); Palermo, Kingdom of the Two Sicilies
- Occupation: botanist

Antonino (or Antonius) de Bivona-Bernardi (1774 or 24 October 1778 – 1837) was a Sicilian botanist, bryologist and phycologist.

He was born in Messina, but was orphaned as a child. He moved to Palermo with the uncle who adopted him. He originally pursued law, but changed his studies to the natural sciences and studied botany under Giuseppe Tineo, director of the Palermo Botanical Garden. After graduating, he travelled to Naples and elsewhere in Italy, making the acquaintance of scientists such as Michele Tenore and Vincenzo Petagna. Professor Francesco Ferrara of Palermo entered a public dispute about the deposits found in Sicily, which he (Antonino), had discovered and thought were fossils. He returned to Palermo upon the death of his uncle, and began to publish botanical works that had great impact in Italy and Europe. He founded the scientific journal "L'Iride" ("The Iris") and obtained the post of Inspector-General of Waters and Forests, but died in Palermo during the cholera epidemic of 1837. His son Andrea Bivona was an agronomist and naturalist.

The genera Bivonaea and Bivonella (type of Fungi) are named for him.
