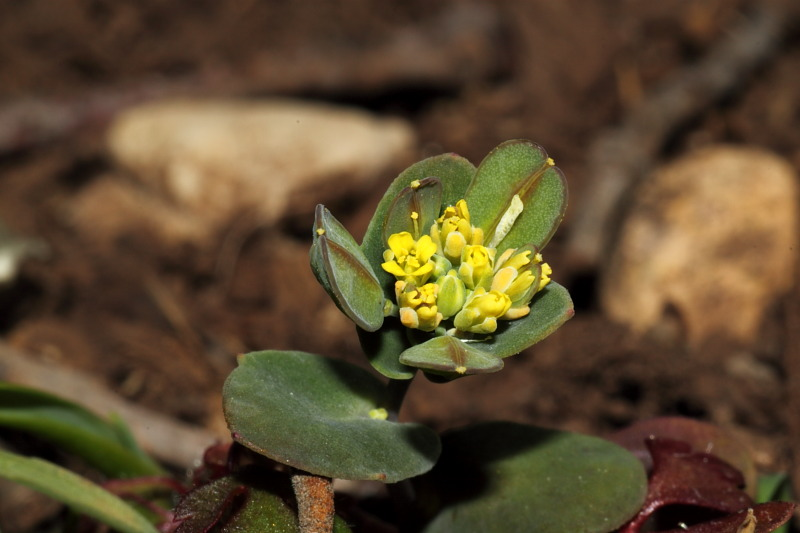
- B. lutea

Scientific classification
- Kingdom: Plantae
- Clade: Tracheophytes
- Clade: Angiosperms
- Clade: Eudicots
- Clade: Rosids
- Order: Brassicales
- Family: Brassicaceae
- Genus: Bivonaea; DC.
- Species: B. lutea

Binomial name
- Bivonaea lutea (Biv.) DC.

Synonyms
- Thlaspi luteum Biv.

= Bivonaea =

Genus of flowering plants

Bivonaea is a genus of flowering plants belonging to the family Brassicaceae. It includes a single species, Bivonaea lutea, an annual native to Algeria, Sardinia, Sicily, and Tunisia in the central Mediterranean region.

The species was first described as Thlaspi luteum by Antonino de Bivona-Bernardi in 1806. In 1821 Augustin Pyramus de Candolle placed in the new monotypic genus Bivonaea as Bivonaea lutea.
