= Pasquale Liotta Cristaldi =

Italian painter

Pasquale Liotta Cristaldi (1850-1909) was an Italian painter.

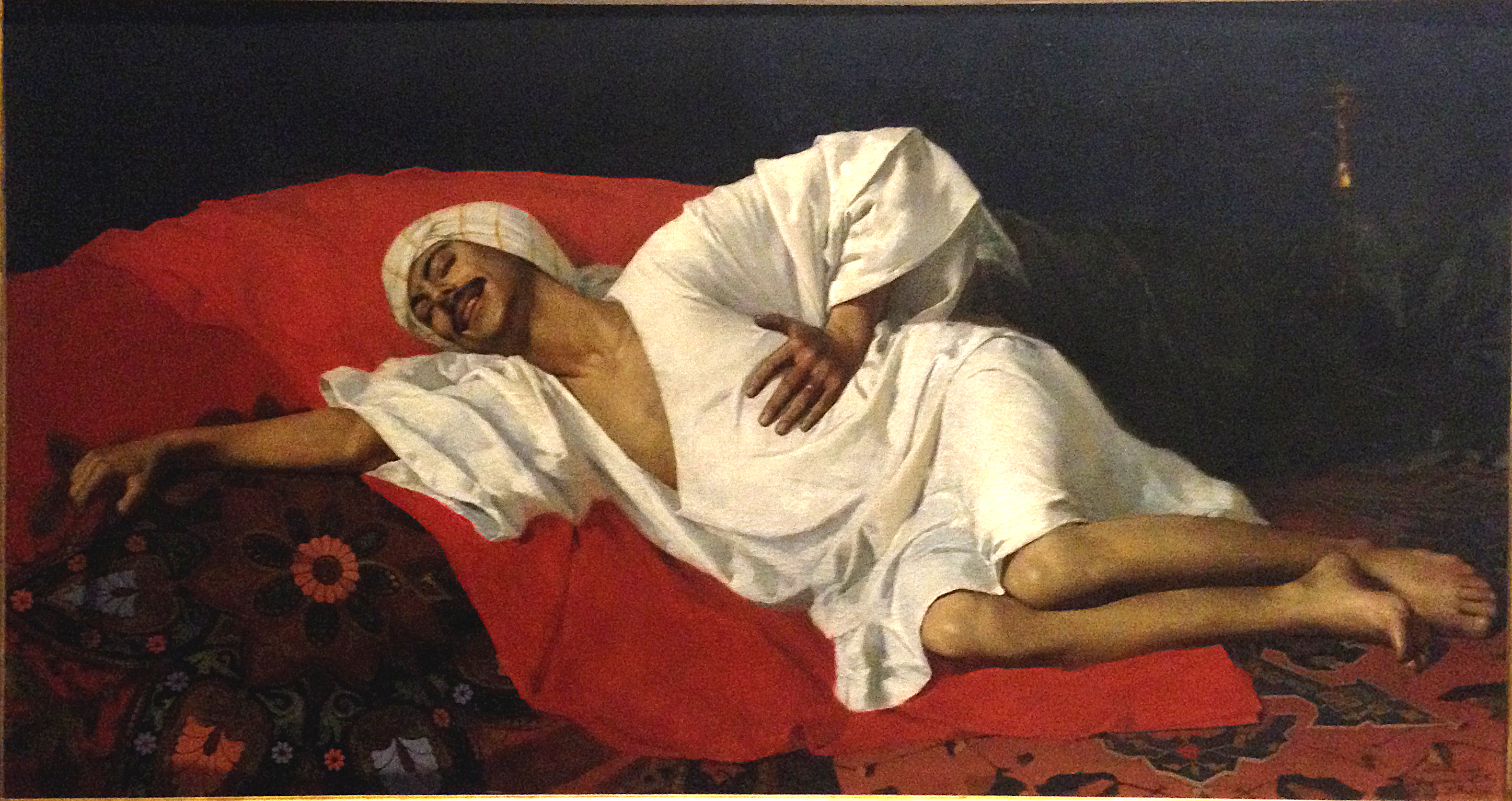
L'effetto dell'hashish - Pasquale Liotta

== Biography ==
He was born and resided in Catania. He trained in Naples under Domenico Morelli. He painted historical, genre, and landscape paintings. Among the historical paintings, was one on the subject of Congiura degli esuli siciliani in Rome (Conspiracy of the Sicilian exiles in Rome), against Charles V, which he exhibited in Naples in 1877. At Turin he exhibited a painting Artista in erba. At Milan, in 1881, he exhibited a Studio dal vero (Study from nature), and at Rome, in 1883, L'abbandonata (The Abandoned). At the 1884 Mostra di Turin he exhibited Vendetta; at 1887 in Venice, he exhibited a Quartetto. He also painted Nightmare of Elizabeth I featuring a beheaded Mary Stuart. He was a colleague and friend of Calcedonio Reina.
