= Antoninów =

Antoninów may refer to the following places:

- Antoninów, Opoczno County in Łódź Voivodeship (central Poland)
- Antoninów, Rawa County in Łódź Voivodeship (central Poland)
- Antoninów, Gostynin County in Masovian Voivodeship (east-central Poland)
- Antoninów, Piaseczno County in Masovian Voivodeship (east-central Poland)
- Antoninów, Płock County in Masovian Voivodeship (east-central Poland)
