= Mario Rapisardi =

Italian poet (1844–1912)

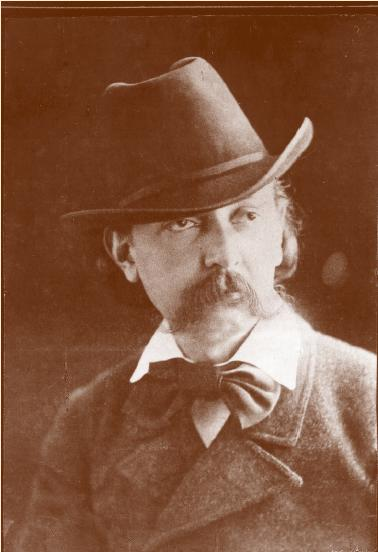
Mario Rapisardi

Mario Rapisardi (25 February 1844, in Catania – 4 January 1912, in Catania) was an Italian poet, supporter of Risorgimento and member of the Scapigliatura (definition but refused).

== Life ==
As a boy, he was taught "grammar, rhetoric and the Latin language" by two priests and "a psicontologico mixture that he thought was philosophy" by a friar. To please his father, he then unwillingly took the usual course in jurisprudence, but never wanted to take the laurea in that or any other faculty. He wrote at this time "there is nothing noteworthy in my life, unless it is this, that - for good or ill - it formed me, destroying the wretched and false education I had received [up to then] and instructing and educating me, in my own way, to be outside whatever school, whatever sect, scornful of systems and prejudices".

He began his poetic career at fourteen with an ode to Saint Agatha, in which he dared to recommend the freedom of his fatherland (then under the Bourbon regime), and in 1863 published a volume of verses under the title Canti. In 1865 he came to Florence for the first time, returning there often later in his life. There he got to know Giovanni Prati, Niccolò Tommaseo, Atto Vannucci, Pietro Fanfani, Andrea Maffei, Giuseppe Regaldi, Erminia, Arnaldo Fusinato, Francesco Dall'Ongaro, Terenzio Mamiani and other "illustri e buoni", as he later called them. Also in Florence he published his La Palingenesi in 1868, recommending a religious revival for humanity. It got good reviews, and Victor Hugo read it and wrote to Rapisardi, saying "...[it is a] noble poem. You are a forerunner".

In 1870 he was appointed to teach Italian literature at the University of Catania. In the spring of 1876, Pedro II d'Alcantara, Emperor of Brazil, stayed in Catania as a guest of Francesco Di Bartolo, who had portrayed him in a work that is now untraced. Di Bartolo accompanied him to the university, where the emperor attended incognito one of Rapisardi's lectures on the final book of Dante's De Monarchia; he also accompanied the emperor on excursions to Mount Etna.

The association between Rapisardi and Di Bartolo continued within Catania's artistic and intellectual milieu. In his letters, Rapisardi affectionately addressed the artist as "Don Bartuliddu". Di Bartolo portrayed him in at least three engravings, produced chiefly for the frontispieces of editions of Rapisardi's works; the three known portraits are reproduced in the Portraits section below. Rapisardi was appointed full professor of Italian literature at the university in 1878. In 1879 he delivered the inaugural lecture for the academic year, entitled "The New Scientific Concept", a subject he regarded as particularly daring because it was presented "before the authorities, in this country and on this solemn occasion".

In 1881 Rapisardi began a long-running controversy with Giosuè Carducci. In 1885 the eighteen-year-old Florentine Amelia Poniatowski Sabernich joined him as his secretary and soon became his lifelong companion, remaining with him until his death. In 1886 he served in Rome on a commission concerning university appointments. In a letter to Amelia, he wrote: "Di Roma non mi piacciono che alcuni ruderi, pochi, non tutti quelli che guardano a bocca aperta i forestieri; le chiese splendide tutte mi fanno rabbia: sono reggie, non templi. (O Santa Maria del Fiore! Quella sì che è la casa del Dio Ignoto, e tale da fare raccogliere l'animo più incredulo in meditazioni sublimi)".

He declined the parliamentary candidacy offered to him by the constituency of Trapani, despite receiving 6,200 votes, an extraordinary number at the time. He cited his poor health, the insufficiency of his studies and a temperament "unsuited to political affairs".

During his years as a professor in Catania, Rapisardi published the poems Lucifero, Giobbe and Atlantide, in which he developed a poetic and philosophical vision of human history. He was a Freemason, as was Carducci, and a chapter of the higher degrees was later named after him.

In 1894 he was attacked by some socialists for advising moderation during the Sicilian unrest. He replied that the movement appeared "untimely", lacked "a common programme" and effective leaders, and that he had acted as a "moderator", not a "peacemaker".

In 1897 he declined an invitation to contribute to the journal L'Università, explaining that he lacked both the time and the inclination to write for newspapers. He nevertheless warned its editors against excluding political questions from the journal. In 1905 a proposal to remove him from his university post caused protests among students at several Italian universities.

In 1909 he replied to an invitation from Filippo Tommaso Marinetti, writing that "the poet's obligation is not to found new schools or to join old ones; his duty is to express himself and to represent reality as he sees and feels it, with complete sincerity, with the warmth and colour of his own soul".

Rapisardi died in Catania in 1912. The city observed three days of official mourning, and his funeral attracted more than 150,000 people, including official representatives from Tunisia. Owing to opposition from the Church authorities, however, his body remained unburied in a storage area at the municipal cemetery for nearly ten years, before finally being interred in 1921.

== Portraits ==
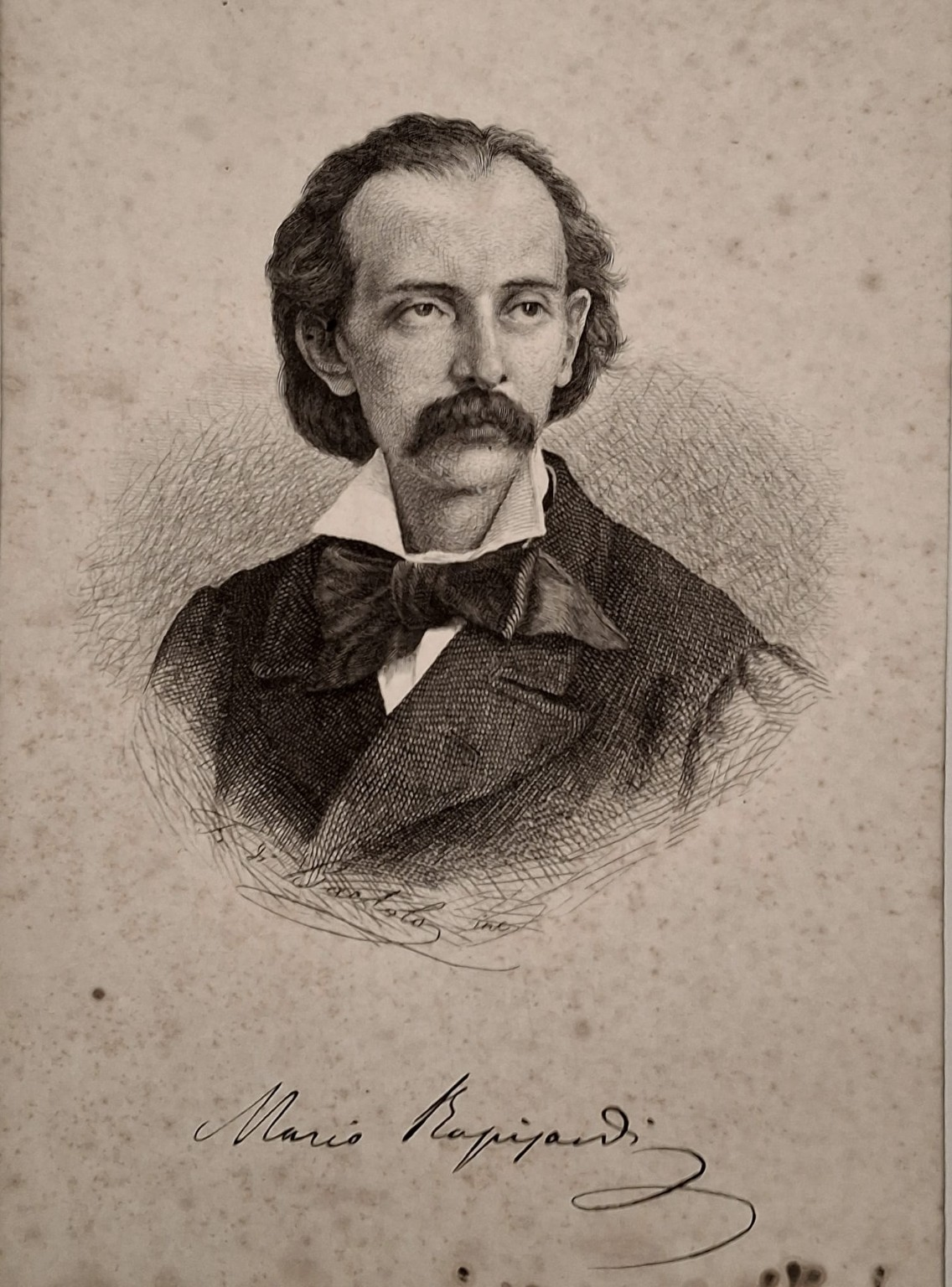
Francesco Di Bartolo, Portrait of Mario Rapisardi, frontal view, etching

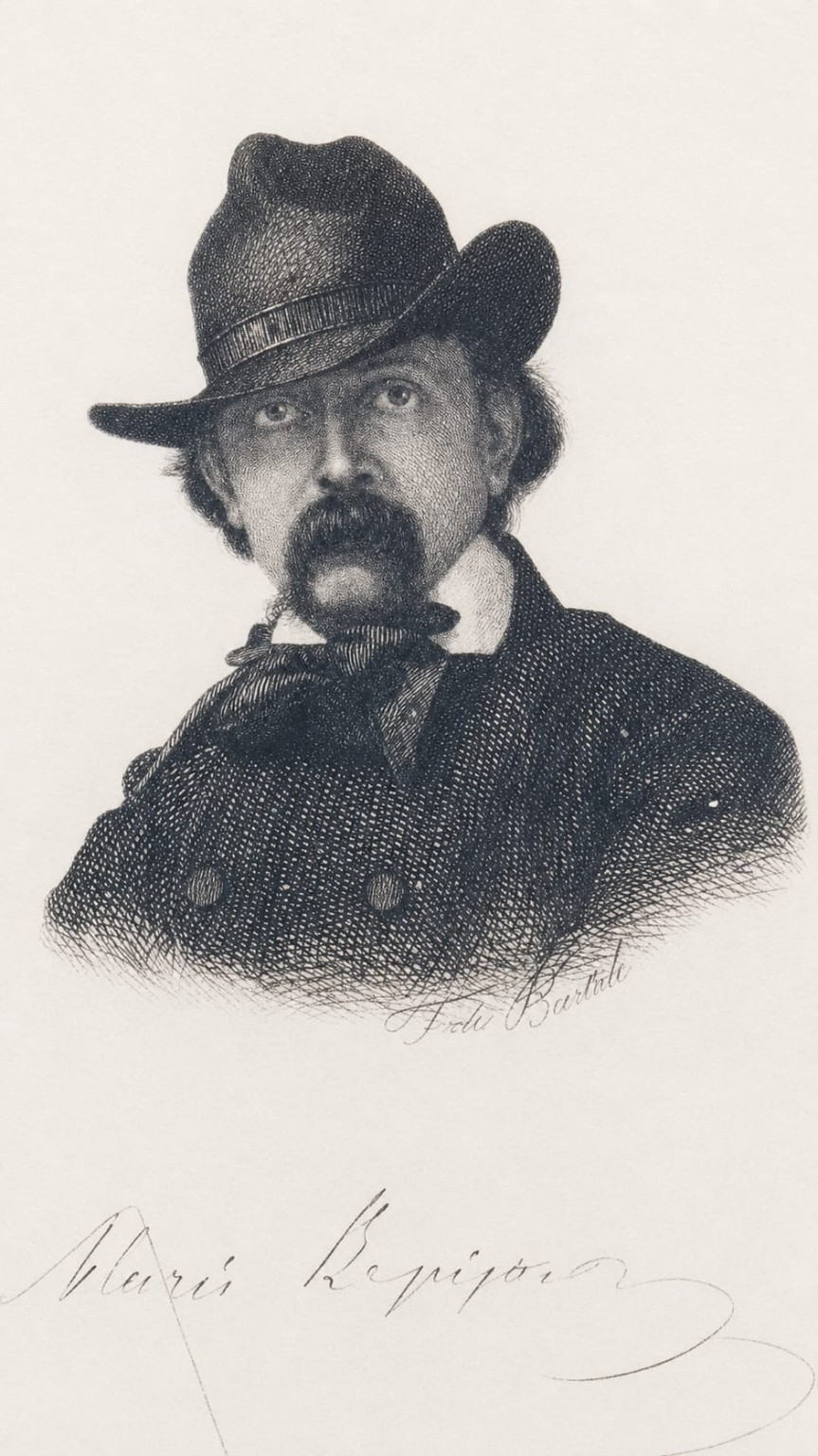
Francesco Di Bartolo, Portrait of Mario Rapisardi wearing a hat, etching

== Works ==
- 1858 - Ode to sant'Agata
- 1863 - Canti, a volume of verses
- 1872, Pisa - Le ricordanze, collection of lyric verses
- 1875, Florence - Catullo e Lesbia
- 1877, Milan - Lucifero, praising Rationalism's triumph over Transcendence.
- 1879, Milan - Translation of Lucretius's De rerum natura
- 1885, Catania - Giustizia, collection of social-reform poetry.
- 1884, Catania - Giobbe, poem expressing the accents of human pain.
- 1887, Catania - Le poesie religiose, advocating religion of a pantheistic mould.
- 1888 - Duetto, a social-reform poem for which he was tried by the magistrate of Venice.
- 1889, Naples - Translation of the works of Catullus.
- 1892, Palermo - Translation of Percy Bysshe Shelley's Prometheus Unbound.
- 1894 - The poem Atlantide, a biting satire and work of caricature about the literati of the day.
- 1897 - Translation of the Odes of Horace.
- 1902 - L'asceta and other poems.

== Bibliography ==
- "Mario Rapisardi", atti del convegno a cura di Sarah Zappulla Muscarà, Giuseppe Maimone Editore, Catania 1991
- Di Bartolo, Natalia (2026). "Francesco Di Bartolo (1826–1913), incisore e pittore. Corpus fondante e corpus di saggi per il Bicentenario della nascita". OperaeOpera (in Italian).

== Other projects ==
- (in Italian) Italian WikiSource has material related to Mario Rapisardi
- (in Italian) Italian WikiQuote has material related to Mario Rapisardi
