= Antonino D'Antona =

Italian physician and politician (1842–1913)

Antonino D’Antona
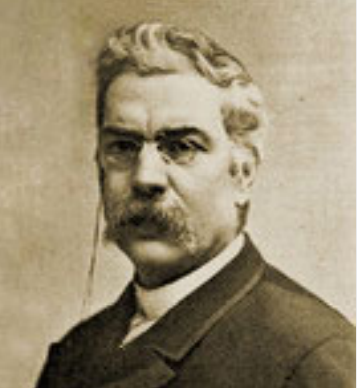
- Born: December 18, 1842; Riesi province Caltanissetta (Sicily), Kingdom of the Two Sicilies
- Died: December 21, 1913 (aged 71); Naples, Italy
- Scientific career
- Fields: medicine, politics
- Workplaces: University of Naples, Hospital of the Pellegrini in Naples

Antonino D’Antona was born in Riesi (Caltanisetta) on December 18, 1842, the son of Antonino and Concetta Debilio. After completing his classical studies in Sicily and after enrolling at the University of Palermo, where he attended the first four years of the medical course, he moved to Naples. He was guided since childhood by the care of a paternal uncle, the archpriest Gaetano D'Antona, who also followed him in the years of his university education. Antonino only had one child: Carlo D’Antona.

He lived in Rome in Villino Durante.

== Adulthood ==
D'Antona received his Medical Degree at 23 years old in 1865. He intended to improve his aptitudes and his method in study and research, dedicating a few more years to his own training. Longing to broaden his education through the knowledge of the main Italian and European scientific circles, he made study trips abroad, and for about three years, from 1866 to 1869, he attended the most renowned surgical clinics of the time: he came to Vienna, where he met Christian A. Billroth and followed his school, in Berlin where he met Langenbeck, in Bristol, where he met Spencer, and finally in Edinburgh, where he met Lister, but also in Leipzig, at JF Cohnheim; in London, he was taught by master T. S. Wells, who then formed a solid friendship with him. This internship in clinical centers of international importance gave him excellent training, oriented towards the most modern and stimulating aspects of surgery, and prepared him for the new applications of the discipline that was facing profound scientific renewals in those years.

== Later life and death ==
In the autumn of 1912, the first signs of a serious illness appeared. Antona's strength declined in a short time, but he continued teaching for an entire academic year. In the following summer, his health conditions worsened. His death in Naples on December 21, 1913, at the age of 71 caused great condolences throughout the nation.

A monument has been erected by the municipality in Riesi, in front of his family house. For Spencer Watson, he was considered “the greatest European Clinician”. With the twentieth century and after the untimely death of D'Antona, Giovanni Pascale, a figure of great importance, in particular in the fight against tuberculosis and tumors, bursts onto the scene of Neapolitan surgery.

His main works are; Essays on abdominal surgery, Naples 1883; The new surgery of the central nervous system, Naples 1893.

== D'Antona medical contribution and career ==
When D’Antona was 27 years old he came back to Naples and became a member of the university surgical team of Carlo Gallozzi and was nominated as preparer of operative medicine at the surgical clinic by ministerial decree of 1872 and he was confirmed until 1880. He was one of the first in Italy to introduce and make antisepsis be known. He was an eclectic surgeon and particularly passionate towards nervous system surgery, reason why he devised a method for determining the cranio-encephalic topography.

In those years he published his first scientific works: studies on inflammation, on the ulcerative process, on surgical infections, on the pathology and surgical clinic of osteo-articular diseases.

In 1881 he won the competition for the title of professor of surgical pathology at the University of Padua. In 1884 he obtained the appointment as full professor and surgeon at the University of Naples, where four years later he was additionally appointed pathologist.

In 1881, he won the national contest for a professorship in surgery at the University of Padua. In 1885 he was offered the opportunity to cover the chair of surgical clinic at the University of Modena, but he gave up to settle in Naples: in this city he had by now acquired a wide reputation that placed him among the main members of the reputed Neapolitan surgical school. On 25 October 1896 he was appointed senator of the Kingdom; nevertheless, he participated little in the work of the Senate.

Among the works on inflammation, the best known is that of Inflammation (Naples 1876), a work of the first years of research, which highlighted his scholarly skills and his capacity for scientific synthesis. On the basis of the experience gained in his study trips, he gave a complete review of the main contemporary theories on the problem, discussing them in the light of his personal observations. D’Antona linked the inflammatory process to the intervention of an inflammatory agent capable of interfering in the mechanisms of nutritional and circulatory currents, altering them profoundly.

== D’Antona as a Surgeon ==
In 1883 D’Antona collected Essays on abdominal surgery in his volume. Thirty laparotomies the notes relating to the various cases operated in his health home. He always devoted a large part of his activity to abdominal surgery and many of his subsequent works dealt with topics of clinical and surgical technique in this sector.

He became interested in spleen surgery, performed splenectomy and splenopexy operations. In 1885, one year preceding E. Bergmann, to whom the paternity of this intervention is often attributed, introduced the technique of paraperitoneal nephrectomy; moreover, he frequently dealt with kidney surgery, published a series of twenty-two nephrectomies and described a new method of suturing and grafting of the ureters.

He mastered ovariectomy. He was exceptionally known for the nephrectomy using the extra-peritoneal route. In 1903, succeeding Palasciano and Gallozzi he became chief of the Surgical Clinic of the University of Naples and occupied this office till death. In his long scientific and clinical activity, D’Antona dealt with many subjects of pathology and the surgical clinic, made important contributions in various sectors and left numerous publications.

D’Antona became interested in the surgical treatment of tuberculosis and presented a report on gastrointestinal tuberculosis at the international conference against tuberculosis held in Rome in 1912. He also devoted himself with interest to surgery of the nervous system: brain, cerebellum, spinal cord, cranial nerves. He was among the scholars of cranio-cerebral topography studies together with C. Giacomini, G. Chiarugi, P. Broca, F. Padula. In the two volumes The new surgery of the central nervous system (Naples 1893–1894) he collected the whole body of his studies and his original contributions, bringing them together in a treatment that integrated the whole panorama of the most up-to-date knowledge of the sector.

The activity of the D’Antona ranged in all fields of surgery. He also dealt with orthopedics and traumatology. His observations on the victims of the 1908 Messina earthquake allowed him to highlight some particularities of the injuries and to describe the crush syndrome. Again, he had extensive experience in gynecology; in many works he gave precise documentation of a large personal case series on the subject of hysterectomy and ovariectomy. He dealt with vascular surgery and thoracoplasty of thoracic fistulas. In the more strictly technical field, D’Antona is remembered above all for the introduction of the antiseptic method in the Neapolitan surgical school, which resulted in a sensational decrease in operative mortality. The antisepsis advocated by D’Antona then completed the improvement of the surgical techniques carried out by Gallozzi, making possible the great progress of the modern surgical clinic. He was among the founding members of the Italian Society of Surgery.

== D’Antona as a professor ==
D’Antona kept a studio open and very frequented by many students until about 1881; he founded and managed for several years a small "health home" in which he admitted and operated many patients, reporting good professional affirmations.

When, following the Baccelli law of 1889, that of clinical propaedeutic was added to the teaching of surgical pathology, D’Antona lavished all his care so that in the school he directed the students could acquire solid theoretical and practical bases for their professional training. Under his guidance many excellent surgeons were trained, including E.Tricomi, G.D'Urso and G.Pascale, who renewed hospital and private surgery; his school produced numerous publications by him and his pupils in those years.

In May 1896 he was delegated, together with E. Bottini, to represent the Italian Society of Surgery in Berlin on the 25th anniversary of the German Society of Surgery.

While he was still teaching, a bronze bust of him is inaugurated in the classroom of the surgical clinic of the University of Naples.

== The fact, the investigation, and the trial ==
The greatest bitterness of D’Antona's life was undergoing a trial because he was accused of manslaughter for having forgotten a foreign body, "a patch" in the abdomen of a patient, suffering from liver cancer. In June 1900, the young merchant Francesco Paolo Iammarino was diagnosed with catarrhal jaundice, by his doctor, Giuseppe Altobello; despite the treatments, there was no sign of improvement. So Iammarino turned first to an expert which diagnosed an obstruction of the biliary tract and suggested him to go to senator D’Antona.

D’Antona diagnosed an occlusion of the biliary tract due to stones or a neoplasm and had to perform a laparotomy, necessary to ascertain the cause of ill, D’Antona was aware of the danger of the surgery. Iammarino decided anyway to undergo the surgery, which was made on October 20, 1900. During the surgery there was a hemorrhage, the wound was left half-open, and on November 17 Iammarino went back home; and on November 20, 1900, he died after having a fever. His relatives asked doctor Altobello for an autopsy, which was made on November 21, and the reason for the death was found due to the presence of surgical gauze. After the first autopsy, the penal proceedings against D’Antona has started. And the doctors Giovanni Pascale and Gerardo Plazza.

The first trial held before the High Court of Justice was in favor of D'Antona for lack of evidence against the honorable Senator. After an initial conclusion of not proceeding, due to lack of clues in 1901. Results confirmed D'Antona's diagnosis, however, it was confirmed that the cause of the death of Iammarino was the gauze lost inside it. But it was not D’Antona's fault, because the gauze was left after the operation was done, which means the fault was of the personal healthcare.

The second trial started in 1903. In February 1904 the discussion of the case was opened before the whole Senate gathered in the High Court of Justice, under the presidency by G. Finali. Another autopsy was ordered by professors Ettore Marchiafava, Gaetano Mazzoni, and Otto von Schrön which believed that the cause of death was the neoplastic mass that compressed blood and bile vessels. In a second step, which had even more echo throughout Italy, after days of sessions, the civil party sensationally abandoned the accusation and the High Court of Justice acquitted the professor "for not having committed the crime".and that D’Antona was innocent.

== Main writings ==
- Baccelli G., Durante F., D'Antona A., Il policlinico. Periodico di medicina, chirurgia e igiene, volume I. Roma, Società editrice Alighieri, 1894.
- D’Antona A. Relazione sui feriti del terremoto Calabro-Siculo. Clinica Chirurgica dell’Università di Napoli, Stabilimento tipografico S. Morano, Napoli 1909.
- D'Antona A. Rendiconto scientifico-clinico di un quinquennio. Clinica Chirurgica dell’Università di Napoli, Stabilimento tipografico S. Morano, Napoli 1909

== Bibliography ==
- Armocida G., Dizionario Biografico degli italiani- Volume 32. Treccani Enciclopedia. 1986.
- Mattoni Y., Storia e prospettive della Giustizia. Un celebre caso di responsabilità medica nel regno d’Italia: il processo al senatore D’Antona. Editoriale Scientifica. N.1 2020.
- Santoro E., Ragno L. Cento anni di chirurgia. Storia e Cronache della Chirurgia Italiana del XX Secolo, Roma Edizioni scientifico romane, 2000. p. 79.
- Senato della Repubblica. "D’Antona Antonino”, Notes9.senato.it.
