= Francesco Ferrara (geologist) =

Italian geologist (1767–1850)

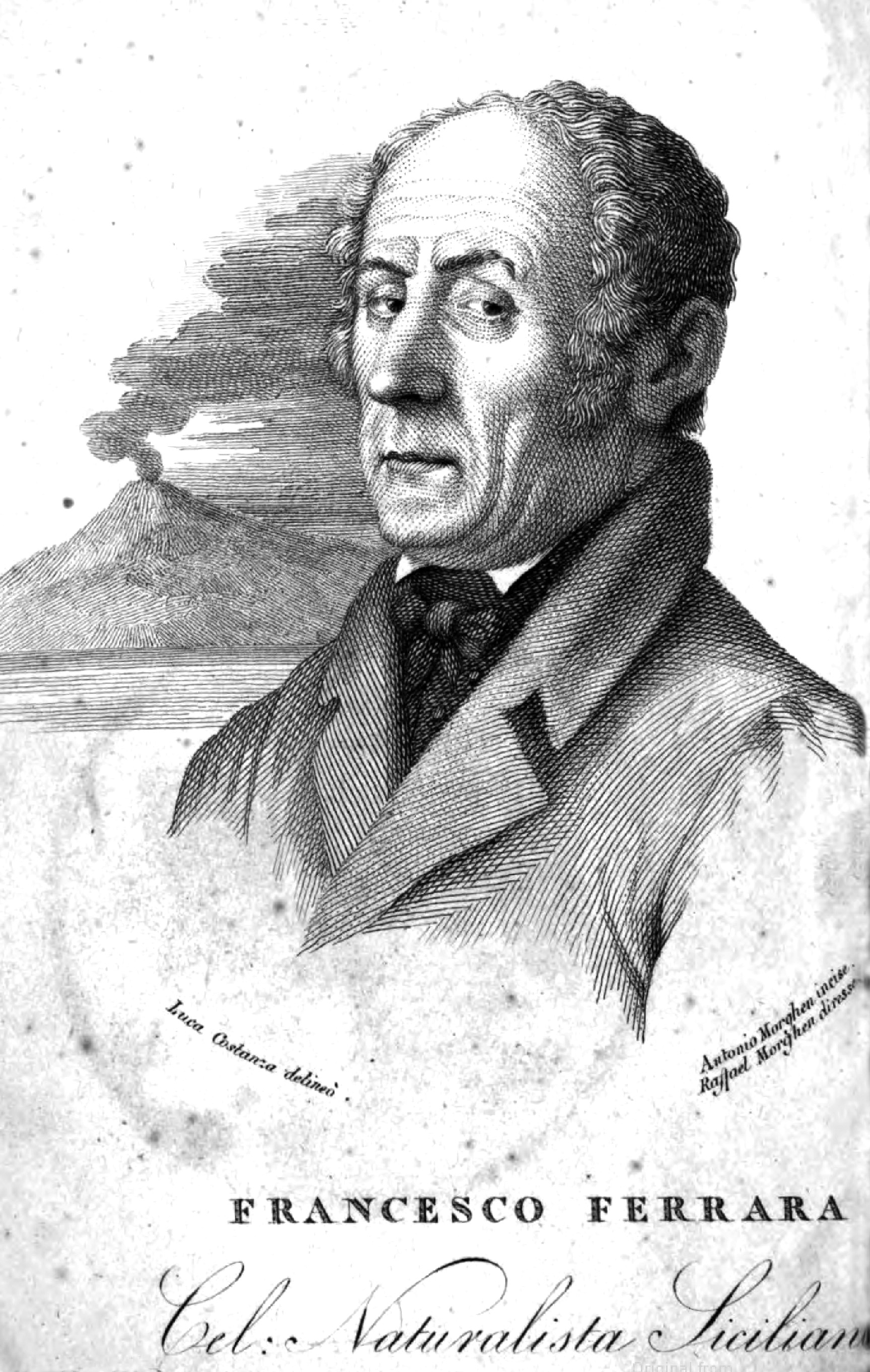
- Born: 2 April 1767; Trecastagni, Kingdom of Sicily
- Died: 12 February 1850 (aged 82); Catania, Kingdom of the Two Sicilies

Academic background
- Education: University of Catania

Academic work
- Discipline: geology archeology
- Sub-discipline: vulcanology
- Institutions: University of Catania; University of Palermo

Francesco Ferrara (2 April 1767 – 12 February 1850) was an Italian geologist. Active mainly in Sicily, he was primarily known for his studies in vulcanology.

== Biography ==
Francesco Ferrara was born to parents of little means from the town of Trecastagni in Sicily, but was sent to study by the age of 11 years to Catania under professor Benedetto d'Agata. In 1778, he began study natural history at the University of Catania, and studied the eruption of Etna occurring the next year. In Catania, he studied multiple disciplines. In 1788, he befriended Lazzaro Spallanzani, who had come to study the volcano. In 1792, he entered the priesthood. In 1814, he was made professor of physics and mathematics at the University of Catania. In 1814, he was named royal intendent of the antiquities of Sicily. He then gained the appointment as professor of Natural History at the University of Palermo. King Francis I of the Two Sicilies knighted him. He also received honorary membership in a variety of medical societies. Ferrara was prolific and wrote numerous books on diverse topics.

Later in life, he took positions as professor of archeology at the University of Catania. In 1834, he wrote a biography of his brother Alfio (1777-1829) who served as a doctor in the British army. Francesco died in Catania.

== Works ==
- Storia generale dell'Etna, Catania 1793.
- Descrizione dell'Etna con la storia delle eruzioni e il catalogo dei prodotti. Palermo: presso Lorenzo Dato. 1818.
- Memorie sopra il lago Naftia nella Sicilia meridionale, sopra l'ambra siciliana, sopra il melo ibleo e la città d'Ibla Megara, sopra Nasso e Callipoli, Palermo 1805.
- I Campi Flegrei e delle isole che le sono intorno (The Phlegraean Fields and the islands surrounding it), Messina 1810.
- Descrizione fisica mineralogica della Sicilia e delle isole che le sono intorno, Messina 1813.
- Storia naturale della Sicilia, che comprende la mineralogia..., Catania 1813
- Memoria sulla antica e distrutta città di Tindari, Palermo 1814.
- Memoria sopra i terremoti della Sicilia in Marzo 1823.
- Discorso sopra il sito di Palermo.
- Storia di Catania sino alla fine del Secolo XVIII, Catania, 1829.
- La Natura, le sue opere e le sue leggi.
- Storia generale della Sicilia (9 Volumes), 1830-'38: Tomo I - Tomo VI - Tomo IX.
- Guida dei viaggiatori agli oggetti più interessanti a vedersi in Sicilia, Palermo 1836
- Le credenze religiose degli antichi Siciliani, insino alla introduzione del Cristianesimo ed altri trattati di Sicula Archeologia. 1844.
- Viaggio di Ulisse intorno alla Sicilia descritto da Omero, e viaggio di Enea descritto da Virgilio.
- Sopra alcune medaglie coniate dal Re Pirro in Sicilia, e sopra una medaglia di Lentini (About some medals minted by King Pyrrhus in Sicily and about a medal of Lentini).
- Sull'influenza dell'aria alla sommità dell'Etna sopra la economia animale.
- Antichi edifici ed altri monumenti di belle arti ancora esistenti in Sicilia, disegnati e descritti dall'abate Francesco Ferrara, Palermo, dalla Tip. reale di guerra, 1814
- Contemplazione della natura del signor Carlo Bonnet con tutte le aggiunte fatte dall'autore all'ultima edizione francese 1781, ed arricchita delle molte note ed osservazioni fatte posteriormente all'ultima veneta edizione 1790 dai signori abati Lazzaro Spallanzani e Francesco Ferrara ... Volume 1. Venezia, presso Antonio Rosa, 1818.
