= Natale Attanasio =

Italian painter (1845–1923)

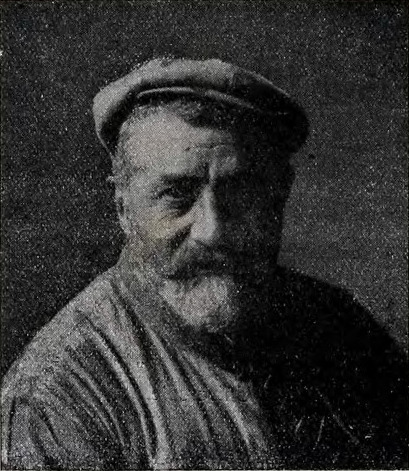
- Born: 24 December 1845
- Died: 1923 (aged 77–78)
- Resting place: Campo Verano

Natale Attanasio (1845 – 1923) was an Italian painter. He painted diverse subjects from period pieces, Oriental fantasies, altarpieces, portraits, and genre works, and worked both in fresco and oil.

== Biography ==
In 1874, Attanasio won a stipend from his native Catania to study in Naples at the Institute of Fine Arts under Domenico Morelli, and then moved to Rome. His painting Sunt lacrimae rerum. Le pazze, depicting women at an insane asylum, won the gold medal at the 1891 Exposition of Palermo. Among his other works Bernardo Palissy and the Orfano dell'Annunciata. He died in Rome.

== Gallery ==
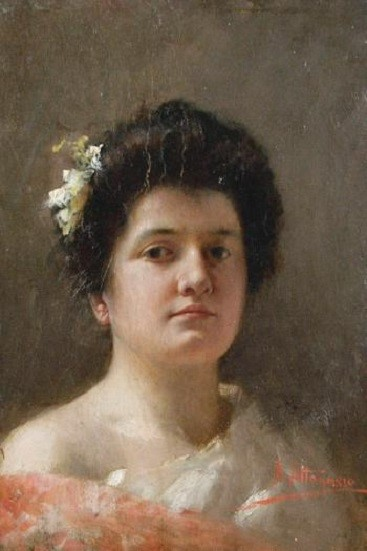
Portrait of young lady

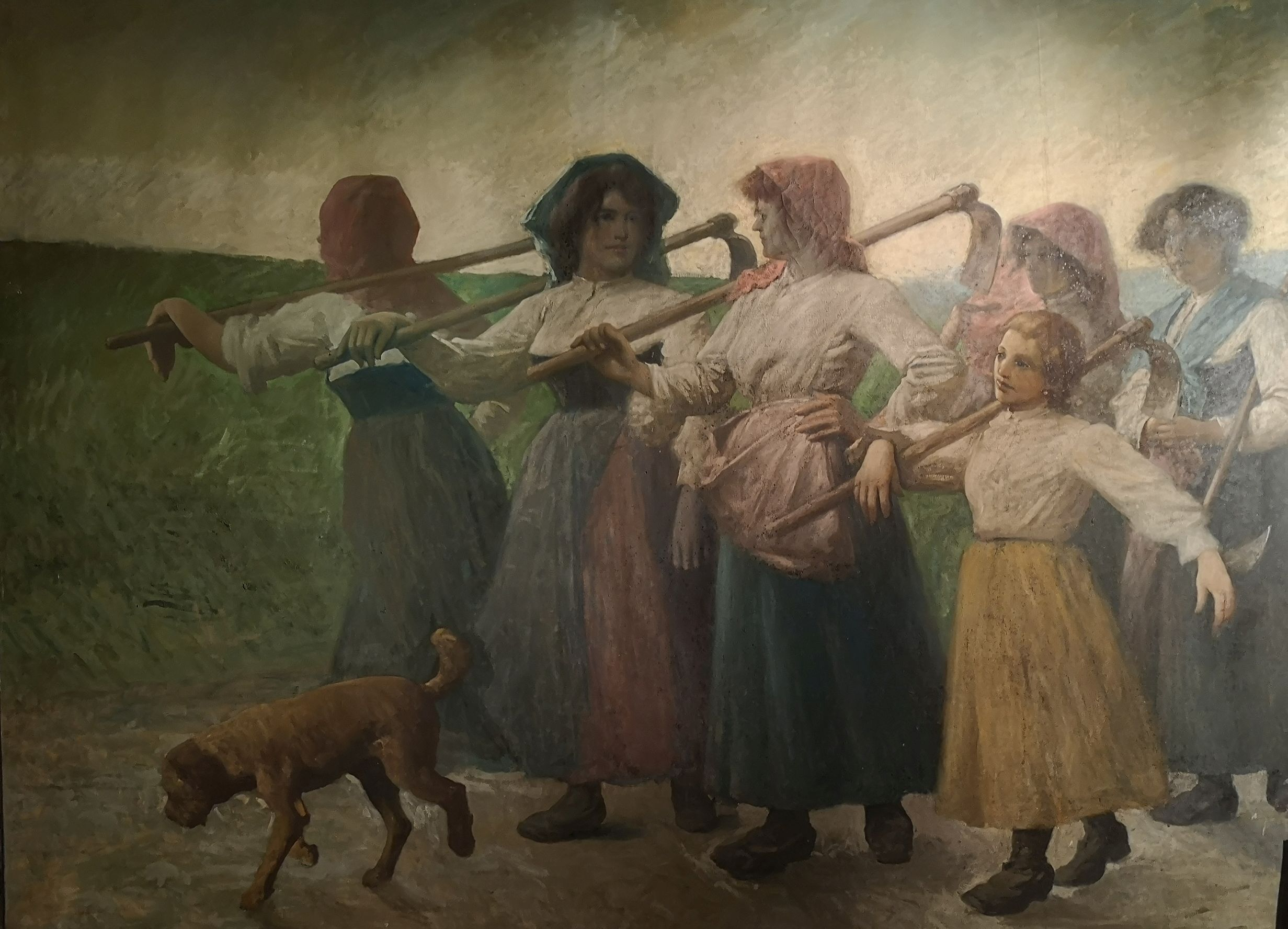
Women at the fields

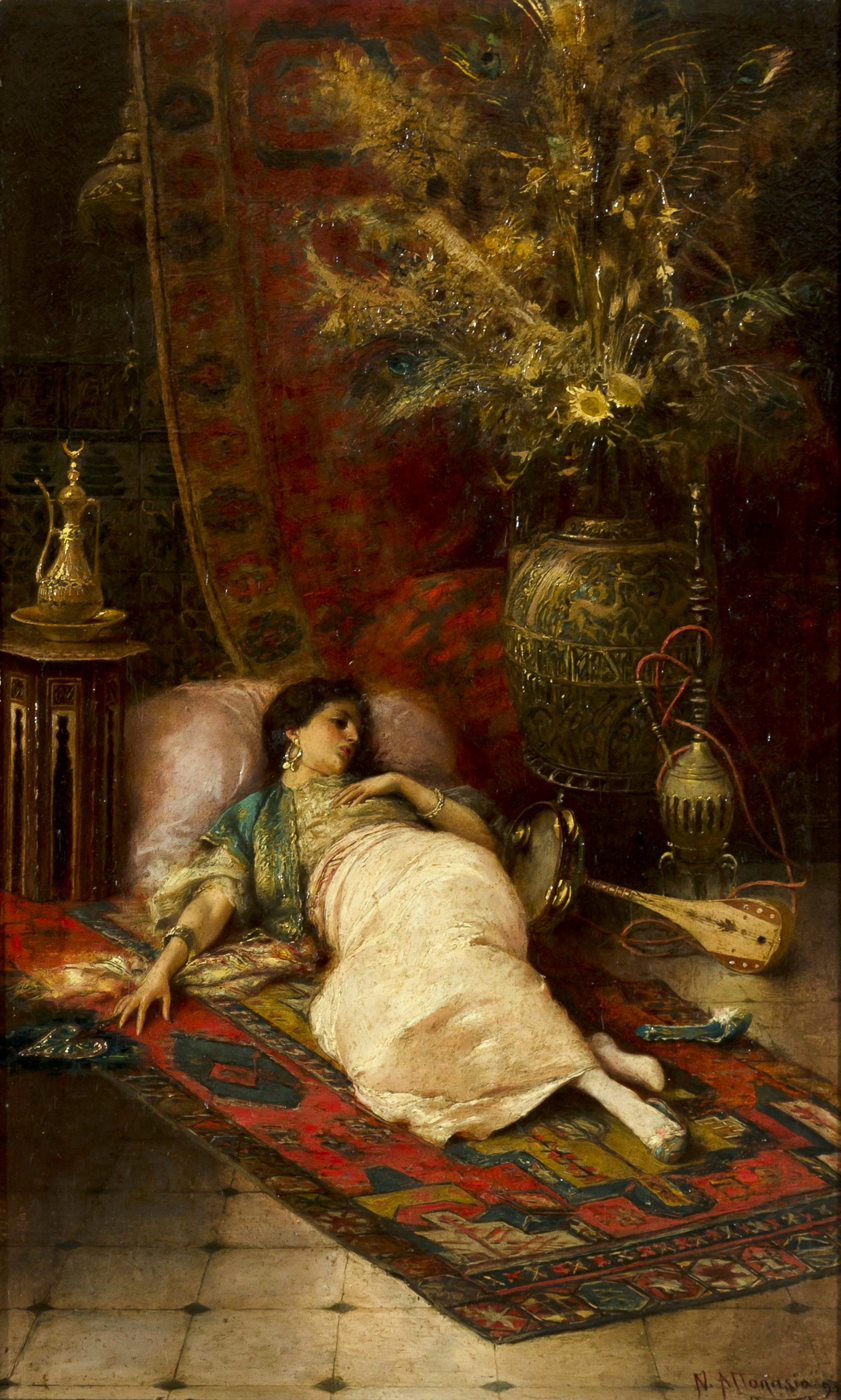
Interior of Harem

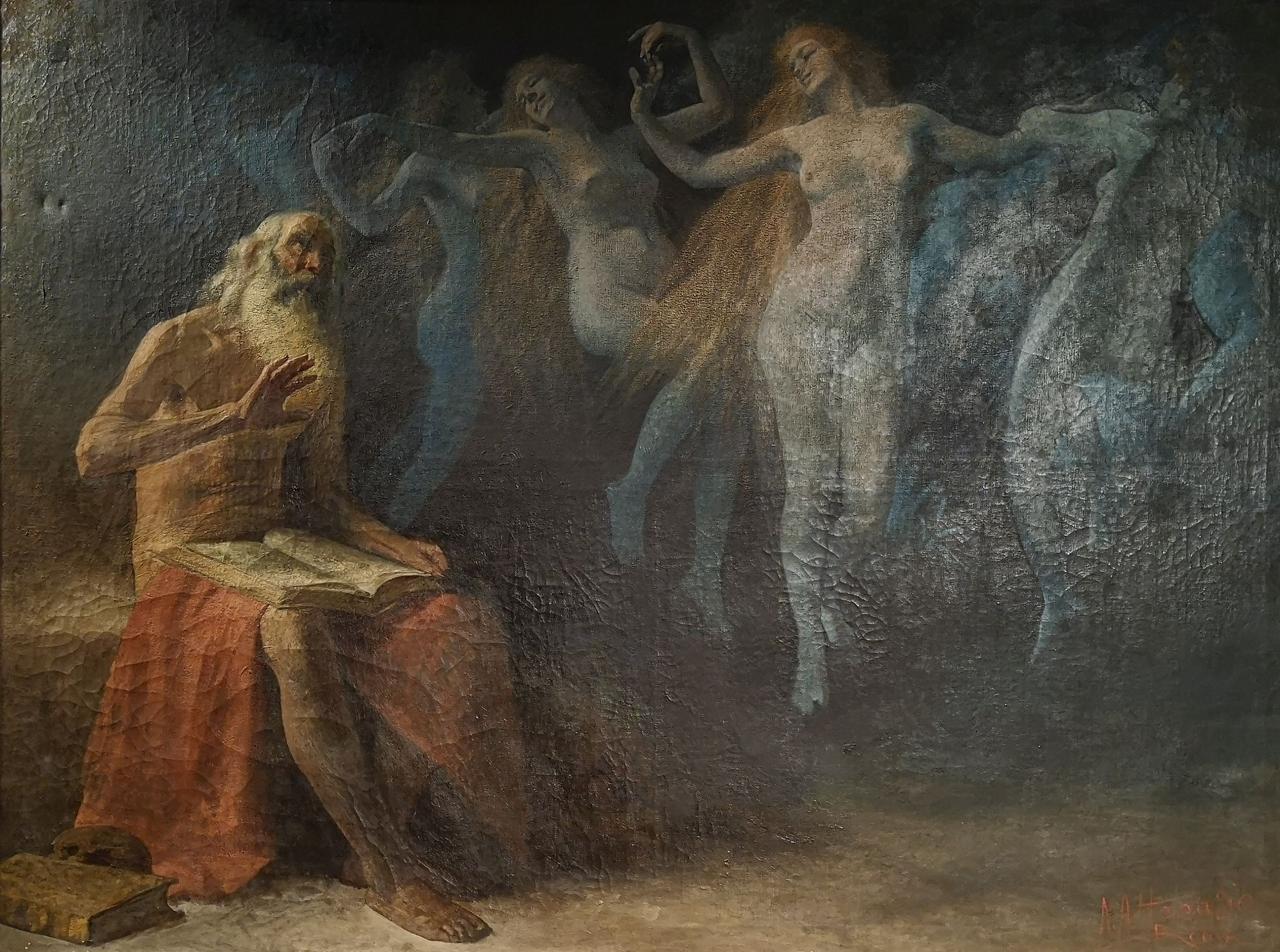
Temptation of St Jerome

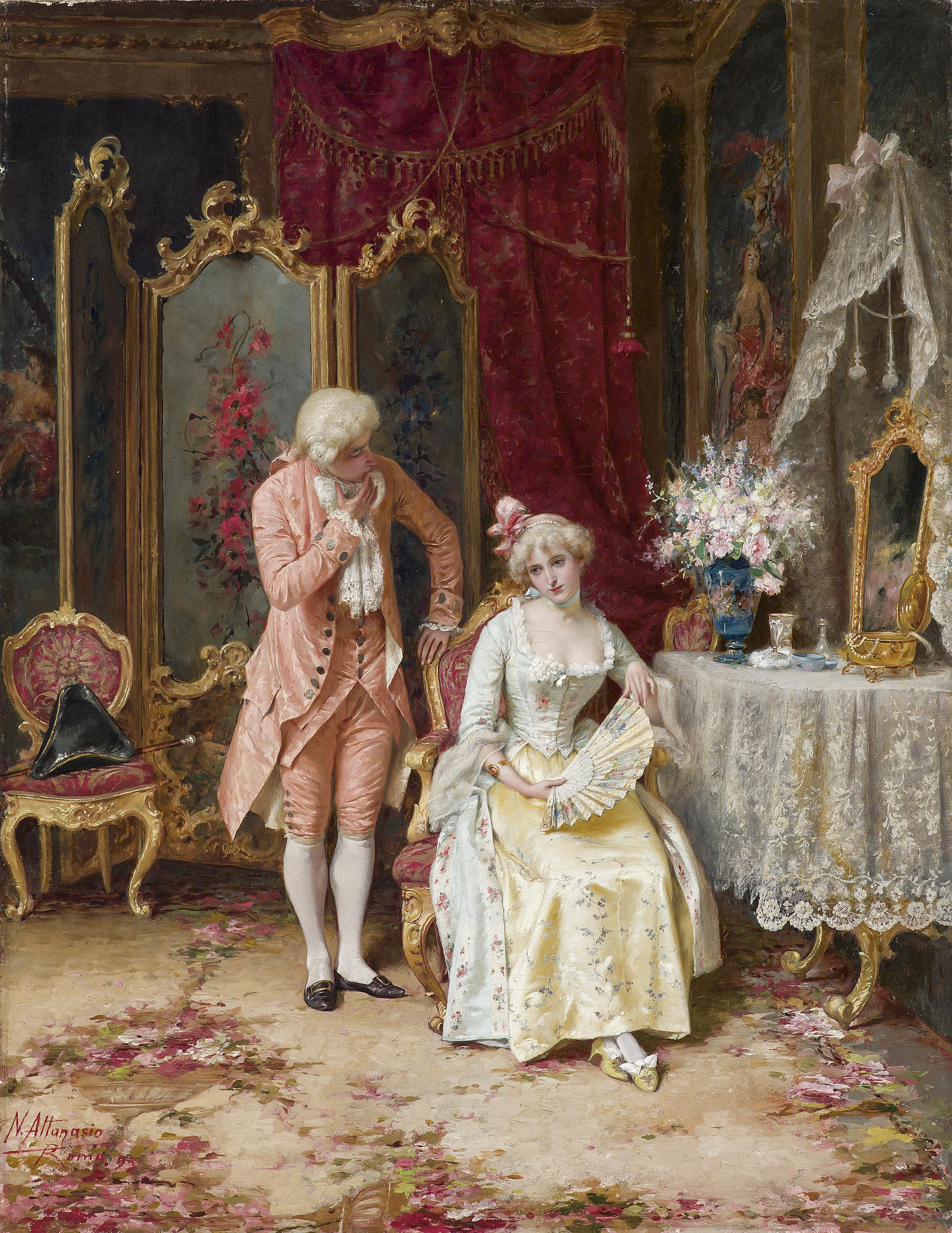
The admirer
