= Emanuelle Cristaldi =

Italian actress

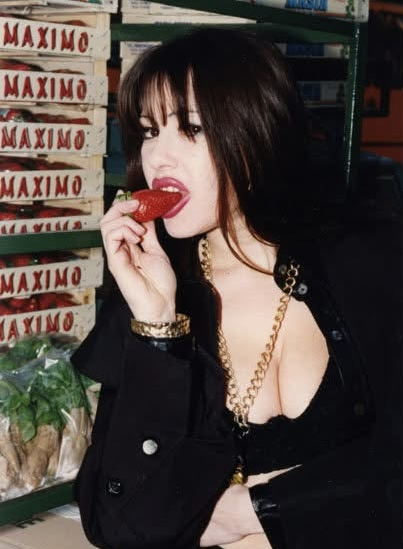
Cristaldi eating a strawberry

Sabrina Barsotti, best known as Emanuelle Cristaldi, is an Italian pornographic and mainstream actress.

Born in Piombino, Barsotti made her debut in erotic/soft-core cinema, appearing among others in Tinto Brass' Paprika. In 1992, she entered the adult industry, and, in 1996, she semi-retired, still continuing to appear in live-shows. She also became a promoter of and responsible for Piombino of "AIDAA", which is an Italian animal rights organization. She also works as a DJ with the stage name Shangai 69.
