= Antoninho (footballer, born 1942) =

Brazilian footballer

Personal information
- Full name: Antônio da Silva
- Date of birth: 25 May 1942
- Place of birth: São Paulo, Brazil
- Date of death: 7 April 2007 (aged 64)
- Place of death: São Paulo, Brazil
- Position: Right winger

Youth career
- –1960: Juventus-SP

Senior career*
Years	Team	Apps	(Gls)
1960–1971	Juventus-SP	174	(40)
1962	→ CA Ituano (loan)		
1968	→ Vasco da Gama (loan)		
1971–1974	Olaria		
1974	Náutico		
1975–1976	Juventus-SP		
- * Club domestic league appearances and goals as of 15 January 2024

Antônio da Silva (25 May 1942 – 7 April 2007), better known as Antoninho, was a Brazilian professional footballer, who played as a right winger.

== Career ==
Revealed in the youth sectors of CA Juventus itself, Antoninho is considered the greatest player in the club's history, as in the 60s he refused to play for the main teams in the state, making 174 appearances in his career and scoring 40 goals for the Mooca team. On 31 May 1969, he scored a historic goal that gave victory against SE Palmeiras after 12 years without a triumph for Juventus. He also had spells at Vasco da Gama, Olaria and Náutico.

== Honours ==
Juventus

- Asahi International Soccer Tournament: 1974
