= Pietro Fanfani =

Italian philologist (1815–1879)

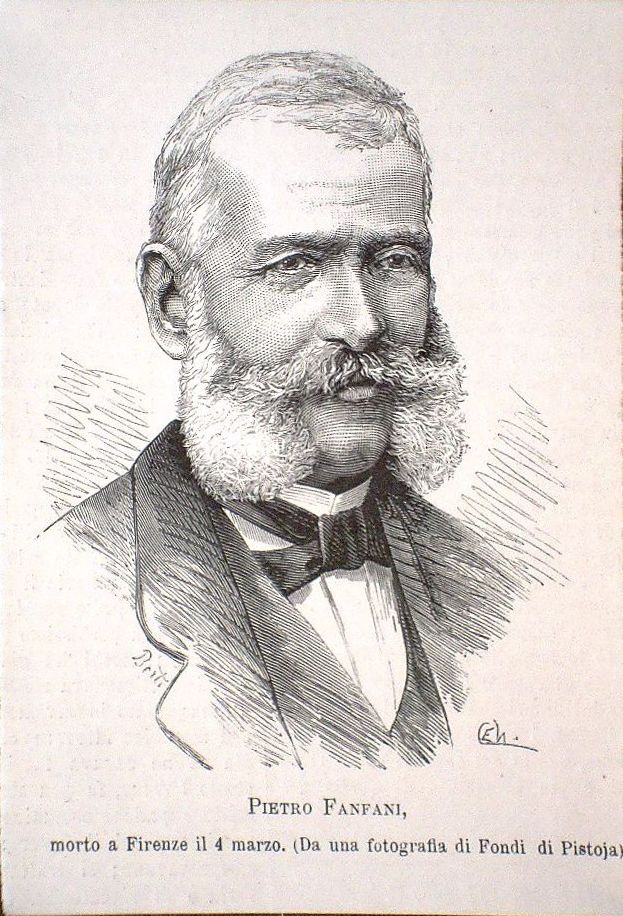
Pietro Fanfani

Pietro Fanfani (21 April 1815, in Pistoia, Italy – 4 March 1879, in Florence) was an Italian philologist, humorist and novelist.

== Biography ==
He studied medicine, but gave his attention chiefly to philology, and in 1847 founded at Pistoia a magazine relating to that science, Ricordi filologici (“Philological Record”). The next year, he enlisted in the war against the Austrians, and fell into their hands. After his release, he published (1849) critical comments on the dictionary of the Academy della Crusca, which involved him in an acrimonious and successful controversy with that institution.

Gioberti obtained employment for him in the ministry of education at Turin. Subsequently, he held an office under the Tuscan government at Florence, where in 1859 he became director of the famous Biblioteca Marucelliana (“Marucellian Library”), which post he held until his death.

== Works ==
=== Philological ===
- Etruria, studi di filologia, di letteratura, di pubblica istruzione e di belle arti (2 vols., Florence, 1851-'2)
- Il Borghini, giornale di filologia e di lettere italiane (3 vols., 1863–65)
- Vocabolario dell' uso toscano (“Vocabulary of Tuscan Usage,” 2 vols., 1863)
- Commento alla Divina Commedia d'Anonimo Florentine del secolo XIV (3 vols., Bologna, 1866)
- Lettere precettive di eccellenti scrittori (2d ed., 1871)

=== Humor ===
- Writ at Random
- The Laughing Democritus: Literary Recreations

=== Other ===
- Regola dei frati di S. Jacopo d'Altopascio (Bologna: Press Gaetano Romagnoli, 1864)
- La Paolina, a novel in the Florentine dialect (2d ed., 1868)
- Una bambola, a story for children (1869)
- Cecco d'Ascoli, a historical narrative of the 14th century (1870; Leipzig, 1871)
- The Coachman and his Family
