= Antonino D'Agata =

Italian politician

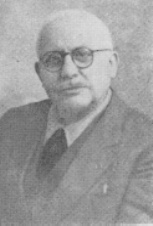
Antonino D'Agata

Antonino D'Agata (23 February 1882 in Avola – 26 February 1947) was an Italian politician. He represented the Italian Communist Party in the Constituent Assembly of Italy from 1946 to 1947.
