= Antonino Cayetano =

Mexican politician

- Born: 27 May 1979 (age 46); Guerrero, Mexico
- Occupation: Politician
- Political party: PRD

Antonino Cayetano Díaz (born 27 May 1979) is a Mexican politician from the Party of the Democratic Revolution. In 2012 he served as Deputy of the LXI Legislature of the Mexican Congress representing Guerrero.
