= Antonino Rocchetti Torres =

Italian painter (1851–1934)

Antonino or Antonio Rocchetti Torres (1851 in Palermo, Kingdom of the Two Sicilies – 1934) was an Italian painter, depicting landscape and genre scenes.

== Biography ==
He studied initially at a military institute and then at a scuole pubbliche tecniche e normali. His family had hoped he would pursue teaching. In 1875 Andrea Costa encouraged Rocchetti to continue to paint. Constrained to alternating between the roles of instructor and artist, Rocchetti's output was limited. His painting subjects were influenced by Filippo Palizzi. He sent works to the National Exhibition of Rome in 1883 and that of Venice in 1887. Among his works: La tentazione; Le prime zucche; Il chiamo dei piccioni; Sui monti; La noia; Un angolo del mio studio; Al fonte e Nell'orto; Un cortile; La pronipote; Agosto; In riva al mare; and Conforto. One of his landscapes was part of an exhibit at the Palermo Gallery of Modern Art in 2013.
