= Antonino Paone =

Antonino Paone (born July 29, 1955) is an Italian-American actor from New Orleans, Louisiana.

== Biography ==
Paone was born in Bova Marina, Calabria, Italy, in 1955. The son of a tailor, Paone grew up in the French Quarter in the midst of an eclectic melting pot of New Orleans characters. By age 20, he had worked as a men's clothing salesman, a grocery clerk, and taken a turn as an MP in the U.S. Army. He graduated from the University of New Orleans with a Bachelor of Arts degree.

A lifelong resident of New Orleans, Paone spent 18 months in Los Angeles to further his film career before Hurricane Katrina. Since the storm, he's lived in his home in the Bywater neighborhood of New Orleans, spitting distance from the Mississippi River.

== Film career ==
Paone has appeared in a number of films, including Tony Bravo in Scenes from a Forgotten Cinema, Mr. 3000 with Bernie Mac, Jump Out Boys with Kris Kristofferson, Angels Die Slowly, I Love You Phillip Morris with Jim Carrey, Righteous Kill, and Inside Out with WWE's Triple H. TV highlights include spots on HBO's Treme, MonsterWolf, and House of Bones. He also appeared in the webseries Alouette.

In 2013 Paone appeared as himself in the 2013 feature-length documentary Bayou Maharajah: The Tragic Genius of James Booker.
