= Antonino Gandolfo Brancaleone =

Italian composer

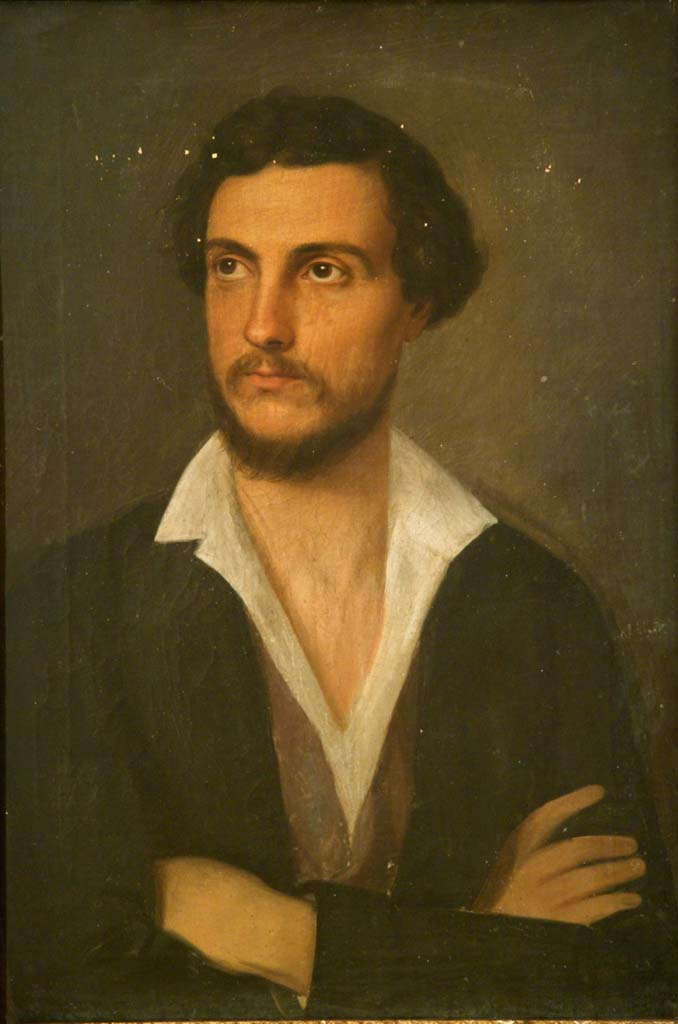
Antonino Gandolfo Brancaleone in a portrait by Giuseppe Gandolfo

Antonino Gandolfo Brancaleone (24 April 1820, in Catania – 6 June 1888, in Catania) was an Italian composer. His masterpiece was Il Sultano (1851).

== Biography ==
He began his studies in Palermo with Pietro Raimondi. Afterward Antonino moved to Naples to study with Saverio Mercadante. Back in Catania, after this training period, he composed sacred and chamber music. He composed the oratory La disfatta degli Assiri (The Assyrian Defeat)(1850) and Gerusalemme Liberata (Jerusalem Delivered) (1852), both performed in Catania during the August Saint Agatha festivities. In 1851, at the Teatro Comunale di Catania was performed for the first time Il Sultano or Maometto II (The Sultan or Muhammad II). The same opera was performed in Naples at the Teatro di San Carlo in 1854 with enthusiastic success, thanks also to the outstanding cast of singers, which included among others the tenor Emilio Pancani and soprano Carlotta Carrozzi Zucchi. In 1859 the opera Caterina di Guisa (Catherine of Guise) was performed for the first time at Teatro Comunale di Catania. In 1859, he was appointed director of the Teatro Comunale di Catania. Antonino had to leave soon Sicily, taking refuge in Malta, to escape the Bourbon police because of his activities as a patriot and opponent of Bourbon's regime. In Malta he remained until Garibaldi's arrival in Sicily (1860), then Antonino returned to his hometown. He devoted himself again to composition and teaching. Among from period Antonino's works mention should be made for the Marcia Funebre (Funeral March), written in occasion of the Vincenzo Bellini's spoils repatriation from Paris (1876), as well as the Inaugurazione symphony (Opening symphony), written in occasion of the scientist patriot Vincenzo Tedeschi's celebration. The Opera Angelo Malipieri remained unpublished.

== Operas ==
Inventory of manuscripts in Antonino Gandolfo fund at the Bellini Musical Institute in Catania (Sicily, Italy)

- Caterina di Guisa (1859) Manuscript of the opera.
- Maometto II or Il Sultano (1886) Manuscript of the opera.
- Principi di musica per ben suonare il cembalo ed organo, ed anche necessari per insegnare il contrappunto. Pamphlet.
- Musical notes
- Agnese. Score of the opera (Act II)
- Gloria (voices and orchestra, full score)
- Tu che dal cielo difendi i prodi (2 sopranos, incomplete)
- Laudamus gratias (soprano and orchestra, full score)
- Symphony in e flat (full score)
- Oratorio (voices and orchestra, full score)
- Qui tollis (voices and orchestra, full score)
- Kyrie
- Tantum ergo (voices and orchestra, full score)
- Marcia funebre in occasione del trasporto delle ceneri di Vincenzo Bellini da Parigi a Catania del maestro Antonino Gandolfi (riduzione per banda di Settimio Sardo)(score)
- Romances (voice and piano)
- Symphony in f (reduction for piano 4 hands)
- Inno di guerra (1848) (orchestra)
- Magnificat (three voices and orchestra, score)
- Fantasia "Un alloro a Bellini" (orchestra)
- Vespro (2 tenors, bass and orchestra, score)
- Ah no tuo figlio prenditi / Aria finale negl'Illinesi del maestro Coppola (voice and piano)
- Dialogo (voices and orchestra)
- Sinfonia fantastica (orchestra, full score)
- Domine Deus (voices e orchestra, full score)
- Qui tollis (voices e orchestra, full score)
- Messa di gloria (voices e orchestra, full score)
- Cum Sanctu Spirito (voices e orchestra, full score)
- Fragments

== Sources ==
- Pastura, Francesco (1968). Secoli di musica catanese. Niccolò Giannotta Editore, Catania.
- Danzuso, Domenico (1987). Gandolfo Antonino. Enciclopedia di Catania. Tringale, Catania.
- Morina, Antonella (2008). Antonino Gandolfo, musicista catanese. Catania University.
