= Antonino Foti =

Antonino (Tony) Foti (born May 12, 1962) is the former assistant coach and recruiting coordinator at Middle Tennessee State University, current head coach of the Greek National Team and owner of SportMind consulting.

== Italian League record ==
- 2013 Valmarecchia ASD
- 2012 San Marino Hornets, Republic of San Marino
- 2011 ASD Macerata
- 2009-2010 Nuoro SC, Nuoro, IT,
- 2007-2008 Forli SC, Forli, IT

== Collegiate Coaching Record ==
- 2013-2023 Middle Tennessee State University Assistant Coach, Murfreesboro. TN
- 2018/2023 C-USA Champions
- 2001-2007 - Mercer University, Macon, GA
- 2003 Atlantic Sun Coach of the Year

142 wins 148 losses, 3 ASUN Conf. Tournament appearances. 2003 season best record in school history, 35–23, winningest coach in Mercer U softball history.

- 1995-2001 - University California, Santa Barbara
- 2000 Big West Conf Coaching Staff of the year
- 1979-1996 - Softball Canada amateur club teams. 1994-1998 National Champions in several categories.
- 1989 Team Manitoba Canada Summer Games Coach
- 2005 Inducted into Sport Manitoba and Softball Manitoba Hall of Fames

== Professional Baseball Record ==
- Major League Baseball
- 2006 Professional Scout Atlanta Braves (Middle Georgia Region)
- 2003 Professional Scout Miami Marlins (Middle Georgia Region)
- 1994 Professional Scout Winnipeg Goldeyes (Independent Northern League)
- 1993 Toronto Blue Jays Roaming Scout and Talent Camp Coordinator (Western Canada)

== National Team Coaching Record ==
Foti is the former head coach of the Greek Softball National Women’s Team (2016-2023). Foti coached Greece at the 2017 ESF Championship, 2018 ESF U23 Championship, 2018 ESF Super 6 Championship and the 2019 WBSC-Europe Women’s Championship.

Foti acted as head coach or assistant coach within Softball Canada's national team program from 1987 to 1996 and again from 2005 to 2013. Coached at 6 World Championships, 3 Pan American Championships, 7 Canada Cup International Tournament, and other national team events. Led Canada's entry into 2009 U16 World Championships in Prague, CZ (5th) and 2011 U19 World Championships in Cape Town, South Africa. He was the National team coach in 17 international events including alternate coach for the 1996 Olympic Games.

== Club Team Record ==
Foti coached several club teams beginning in 1979 in Winnipeg, Manitoba, Canada. He has over 1000 victories in career, with 4 National Championships.

== Personal life ==
Tony Foti is married to Candida Cerri, former Italian Softball National Team player. Foti has two children from a previous marriage: a son Dayne, 28, and a daughter Devyn, 30

Earned BA in Management (International College, Los Angeles, 1985) Earned BS in Health & Physical Ed (LaSalle U, 2000).
