= Antonino Isordia =

Mexican film and documentary director (born 1973)

Antonino Isordia Llamazares
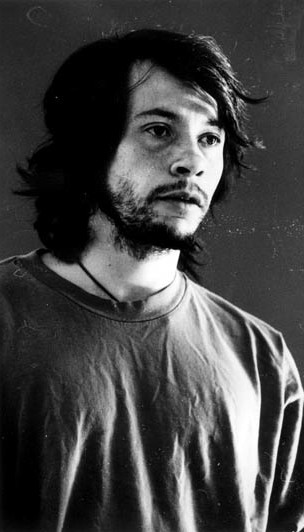
- Antonino Isordia in the film 1973, that was shot over 11 years and was released in 2005
- Born: 30 April 1973 (age 52); Xilitla, San Luis Potosí
- Other names: Antonio Isordia
- Occupations: Film maker and documentary film maker
- Years active: 1992 – present

Antonino Isordia Llamazares (born 30 April 1973 in Xilitla, San Luis Potosí) is a Mexican film and documentary director known for making documentary films in a more cinematic style. His films have been shown at International Film Festivals and received awards in his native Mexico, Argentina, Austria, Canada, Chile, Colombia, Cuba, France, Germany, Spain, and the United States. He has had a documentary feature film and a documentary short each nominated for Ariel Awards.

Isordia is a graduate of the Centro de Capacitación Cinematográfica film school in Mexico City. He also attended the Berlinale Talent Campus in Berlin, Germany in 2005. His most notable films are 1973 (2005) and Los Niños Devoran Lobos (Kids Devour Wolves, 2008). His films and documentaries have won the Silver Goddess Mexican Award and the JVC award of the Guadalajara International Film Festival. He won an award for Best Video Documentary at the Valdivia International Film Festival in Valdivia, Chile in 2001 for Descenso (Descent). 1973 appeared at the Seminci Film Festival in Valladolid, Spain. In Variety Robert Koehler wrote of Isordia's work from the Palm Springs International Film Festival that:

Particularly in opening section, 1973 presents an astonishing, intensely complex visual and audio design that sets a new standard for cinematically-stylish non-fiction and transforms the standard talking-head docu.

— Robert Koehler, Variety

The subject matter of Los Niños Devoran Lobos, violence among youths, was considered important enough that the rights were picked up for broadcast in 2008 on Tr3s in Mexico and MTV Latin America in Central America and several South American countries including Argentina, Bolivia, Chile, Colombia, Ecuador, Peru, and Venezuela. He directed a brief animated introduction to the first Cinema Planeta Film Festival held in Cuernavaca, Morelos in 2009. He then produced a similar animated short, that was directed by Carlos Armella, which served as an introduction to the second Cinema Planeta Film Festival held in 2010.

== Works ==
In addition to directing documentaries, Antonino Isordia (also credited as Antonio Isordia) has worked on film sound, sound recording, production, and screenplay writing.

List of films and television programs
Title	Year	Run time (min.)	Notes
Sangre de tu sangre	1992		director
Discurso de alcohol para una hija adormecida	1994		director
El café y la muerte	1996	7	director and writer of this short documentary
El agujero	1997		sound director on film directed by Beto Gómez
El último recuerdo de Leocadio	1998	20	director of this drama Shown at the Rencontres Henri Langlois 23rd International Film Schools Festival in Poitiers, France (2000)
Descenso	2000	20	director and writer of this documentary Nominated for Ariel Award for Documentary Short in 2003; First Prize, IV International Film Schools Festivals, Buenos Aires (July 2000); Jury's special prize, Mexico City Film Festival (October 2000); Shown at the Guadalajara International Film Festival
Por si no te vuelvo a ver	2000	97	sound engineer on this comedy film
Tierra menonita	2000	58	sound on documentary
La canción del pulque	2003	60	sound on documentary directed by Everardo González
El país roto, Las guerras de Miguel Ramos Arizpe	2004	44	director of this television documentary about Miguel Ramos Arizpe
1973	2005	96	producer, director, and writer Nominated for Ariel Award for Documentary Feature in 2006; Shown at the 3rd Festival International de Cine de Morelia (October 2005); Shown at the Palm Springs International Film Festival (January 2006); Shown at the Riverside International Film Festival (2006)
Hasta el último trago... corazón!	2005	100	sound on documentary directed by Beto Gómez
Tepeyolotl, corazón del cerro	2005	30	sound engineer on documentary directed by Miguel Ángel García
Retratos de la educación (I & II)	2006	45	producer, codirector, and cowriter of this two part television documentary
Sonora, Alma de frontera	2007	45	director of this television documentary about the State of Sonora
Los niños devoran lobos	2008	90	director and cinematographer of this documentary World premiere at the 5th FICCO festival in Mexico City (February – March 2008)
Querétaro, Corazón del Barroco	2008	46	director of this television program
En los pasos de Abraham	2010	90	sound engineer on this documentary directed by Daniel Goldberg Lerner
Borreguito	2010	10	director and writer Winner of a Prize for Fiction at the 10th National Competition for Short Film in Mexico City (6 June 2010); Shown at the Guadalajara International Film Festival (March 2011); Shown at the Cannes Court Métrage short film corner (11 – 22 May 2011)

== Later work and recent projects ==
In 2016, Isordia participated as one of the directors of the collaborative environmental documentary Nahui Ollin, sol de movimiento, a film that brings together multiple perspectives on the effects of climate change in Mexico and was presented in international documentary film cycles.

In 2019, he wrote and directed At’Anii’ (Tu amante), his first narrative feature film, spoken primarily in the Téenek language. The film was developed as part of a filmmaking workshop with communities from the Huasteca Potosina region and premiered at the 34th Guadalajara International Film Festival, where it competed in the Mezcal Award for fiction. It was later screened at the Cineteca Alameda in San Luis Potosí.

His documentary 1973, developed over several decades, has continued to be screened at film festivals and cultural events, including its presentation at the 24th Macabro International Horror Film Festival in Mexico City in 2025, reflecting the continued relevance of his early work.
