= Calcedonio Reina =

Italian painter

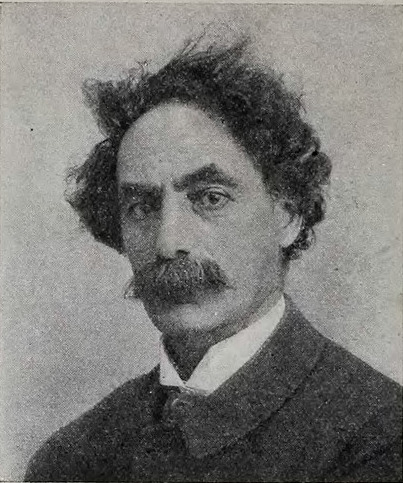
- Born: 4 February 1843; Catania
- Died: 9 November 1911; Catania
- Occupations: Painter, poet

Calcedonio Reina (4 February 1843, in Catania, Sicily – 9 November 1911, in Catania) was an Italian painter and poet. He is described as having a melancholic and neurasthenic temperament in life and art.

== Biography ==
His father, Euplio Reina, was a prominent physician, scientist and philanthropist in Sicily who wanted his son to follow him into a medical career. In 1864, before Calcedonio moved to Naples to attend the Institute of Fine Arts, his father recommended him to Francesco Di Bartolo, a Catanese engraver already established in the Neapolitan artistic milieu.

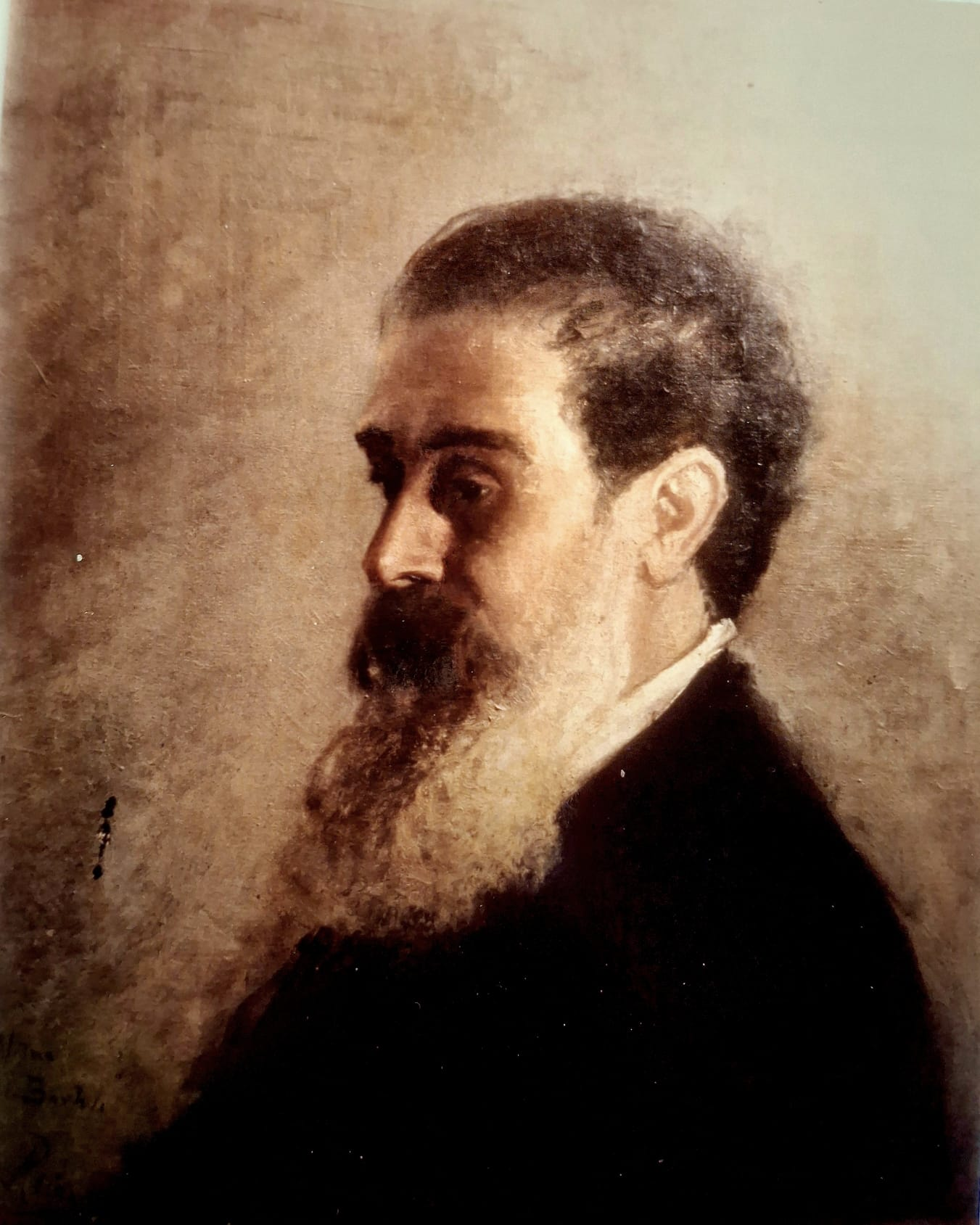
Calcedonio Reina, Portrait of Francesco Di Bartolo, oil on canvas, 1891, private collection

The recommendation reflected the relationship of trust between Euplio Reina and Di Bartolo: years earlier, Reina had recognised the young artist's vocation for engraving and had helped him obtain a municipal grant to study engraving in Naples. Di Bartolo became an early point of reference for Calcedonio within the Neapolitan art world, and their relationship developed into a lifelong personal and artistic friendship.

In Naples, Calcedonio soon found himself making copies of the classic sculptures in the Capodimonte Museum. He was accepted as a pupil by the Institute of Fine Arts under Domenico Morelli. Soon afterwards he travelled to Florence and Rome, prolifically painting interiors and vedute of ruins and making drawings of statues and busts. His paintings include Il Cieco pompeiano (The Blind Man in Pompeii); Suor Clara sedotta dal demonio (Sister Clara Seduced by a Demon); and Una scena dell'89 (A Scene from 1889).

At the 1877 National Fine Arts Exhibition in Naples, he exhibited Accaduto nel coretto (The Correct Man's Accident); Miserere; Exagitatio (Agitation); and Ada. In 1881 at Turin, and the next year at Milan, he exhibited Amore e morte (Love and Death) — showing a couple having a loving kiss in front of the rows of mummified corpses in Palermo's Catacombs of Cappuccini, it is a morbid, almost ghoulish, variation on Hayez's The Kiss.

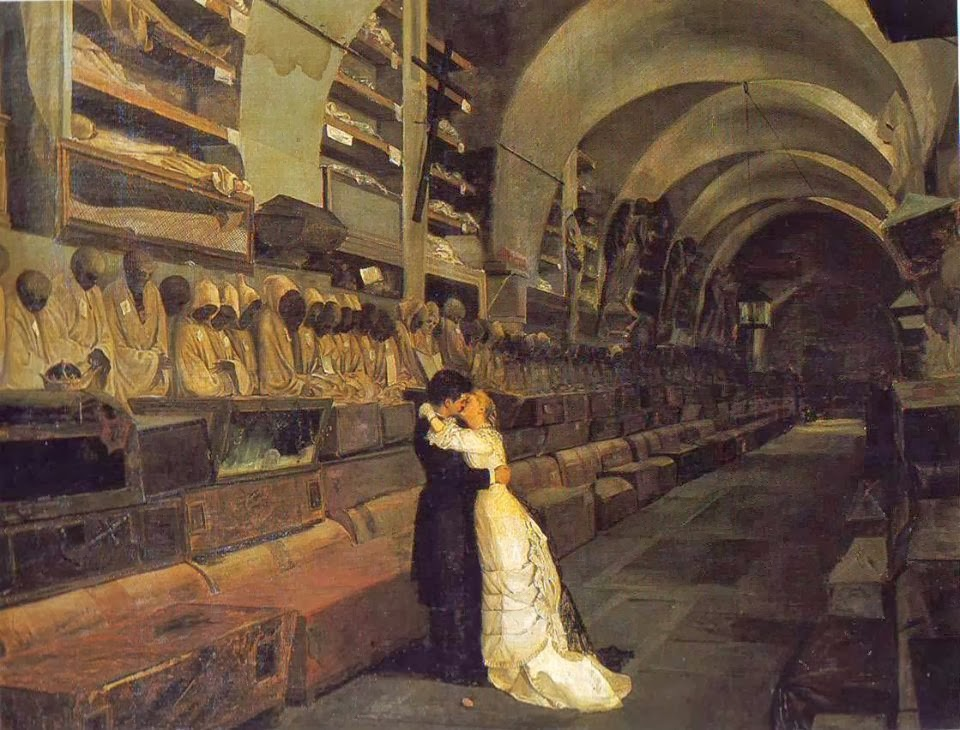
Amore e morte (Love and Death) at Castello Ursino, Catania

In 1883 at Rome, he exhibited Per Montecarlo (For Monte Carlo, now lost); and È lui.. (And he.., also known as Accaduto nel Coretto). In Berlin in 1883 and London in 1888, he exhibited paintings titled Temptation. At Palermo in 1891-1892 he exhibited Campagne d'una volta (Past Campaigns) and Expiation. He entered a painting entitled Vendetta (Revenge) for the 1897 Brera Triennale in Milan. In 1898 he sent Nyosoumba to be exhibited in Turin and Ti aspetto (I Am Waiting For You) to St Petersburg in Russia.

His book of poetry Canti della Patria (Songs of the Fatherland) was warmly received by contemporaries such as Victor Hugo, Guerrazzi, and Tommasèo. Calcedonio was a friend of the famed Sicilian poet Mario Rapisardi.

The house where he lived and died in Catania has a plaque on its exterior calling him a poet in painting, and a painter in poetry - in full it reads: Calcedonio Reina / Cuore e mente d'artista / Incarno potentemente / incarnó potentemente / il pensiero geniale / nella magia dei colori e dei versi / e fu poeta nella pittura/pittore nella poesia / in questa casa ov'egli visse e morí / la patria / a perenne ricordo.

== Bibliography ==
- Gianelli, Enrico (1916). Artisti Napoletani Viventi: Pittori, scultori, incisori, ed Architetti (in Italian). Naples: Tipografia Melfi e Joele. pp. 400–402.
- de Gubernatis, Angelo (1889). Dizionario degli Artisti Italiani Viventi: pittori, scultori, e Architetti (in Italian). Tipografia dei Successori Le Monnier. p. 410.
- Di Bartolo, Natalia (2026). "Francesco Di Bartolo (1826–1913), incisore e pittore. Corpus fondante e corpus di saggi per il Bicentenario della nascita". OperaeOpera (in Italian).
