= Lucius Caecilius Iucundus =

Roman banker (born c. AD 9, fl. 27–c. 62)

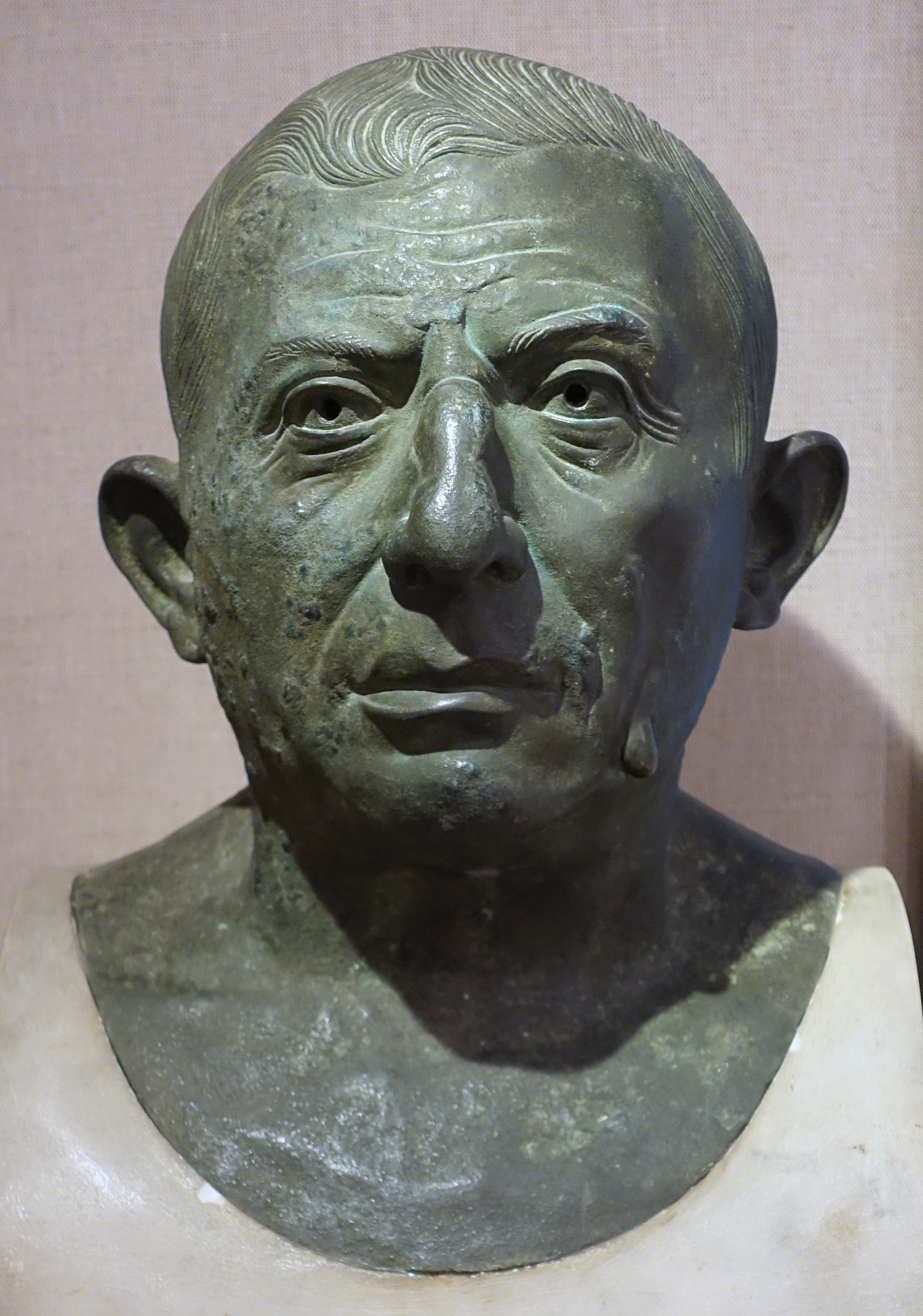
- Bronze head from a herm found in the House of Lucius Caecilius Iucundus, believed to depict Iucundus
- Born: c. AD 9
- Died: 62 (aged 52–53) , assumed
- Known for: Pompeian banker
- Children: Quintus Caecilius Iucundus; Sextus Caecilius Iucundus Metellus

Lucius Caecilius Iucundus (born c. AD 9, fl. AD 27–c. AD 62) was a banker who lived in the Roman town of Pompeii around AD 14–62. His house still stands and can be seen in the ruins of the city of Pompeii which remain after being partially destroyed by the eruption of Vesuvius in AD 79. The house is known both for its frescoes and for the trove of wax tablets discovered there in 1875, which gave scholars access to the records of Iucundus's banking operations.

Iucundus is the basis of the character Caecilius in the Cambridge Latin Course, a British series of Latin textbooks based around the life of Caecilius and his family. He is also the basis of the Doctor Who character Lobus Caecilius, played by Peter Capaldi, whose fate is given symbolic importance for the version of the title character later portrayed by Capaldi. He also appears as a minor character in the novel Pompeii by Robert Harris.

== Life ==
Freedmen and slaves performed many small business tasks for Iucundus, such as signing receipts as witnesses and collecting payments from clients. The freedmen Phoebus, Communis and Chryseros are named in his records as acting for him, as are the slaves Philadelphus, Menippus and Dionysus. A further freedman named Felix has been suggested as the dedicator of the portrait herm of Iucundus found in the atrium of the house.

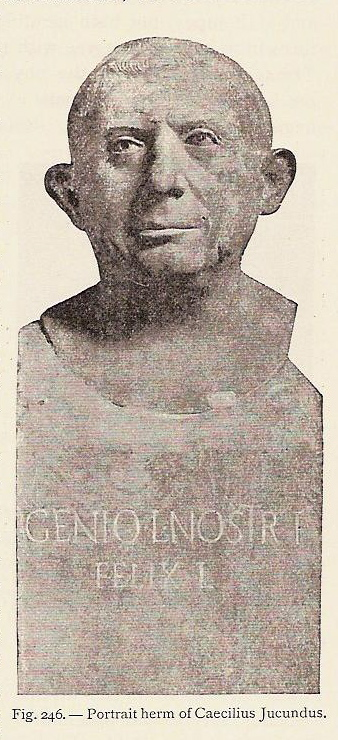
Portrait bust found in the atrium of the house of Iucundus, one of two thought to depict him

Many names of elite Pompeian citizens occur frequently in his transaction records, suggesting that Iucundus also had dealings with the upper class of his town. In fact, he even travelled to nearby Nuceria to help the wealthy Praetorian Guard senior centurion Publius Alfenus Varus resell some slaves that he had purchased in an auction.

He had at least two sons, Sextus Caecilius Iucundus Metellus and Quintus Caecilius Iucundus. Iucundus departed from the traditional naming system, giving each of his sons a name that implied a relationship with the illustrious family of the Caecilii Metelli. Little is known of either, though the incomplete state of the records of Iucundus's business — which were buried in his house, alongside unfinished and unused tablets, in AD 79, but contain no records later than 62 — has been taken as evidence that they did not follow their father into the banking trade.

Little is known for sure about Iucundus's life. He was born around the end of Augustus's reign (that is, before c. AD 14) to a freedman named Felix, who was also a banker. He is likely to have entered the banking business by AD 27. By AD 58 he was well-established as a successful banker who dealt with a wide variety of Pompeiians. He is believed to have had offices either in the macellum or in his house, and to have worked alongside around six associates, including a freedman of the Helvii family named Apollonaris.

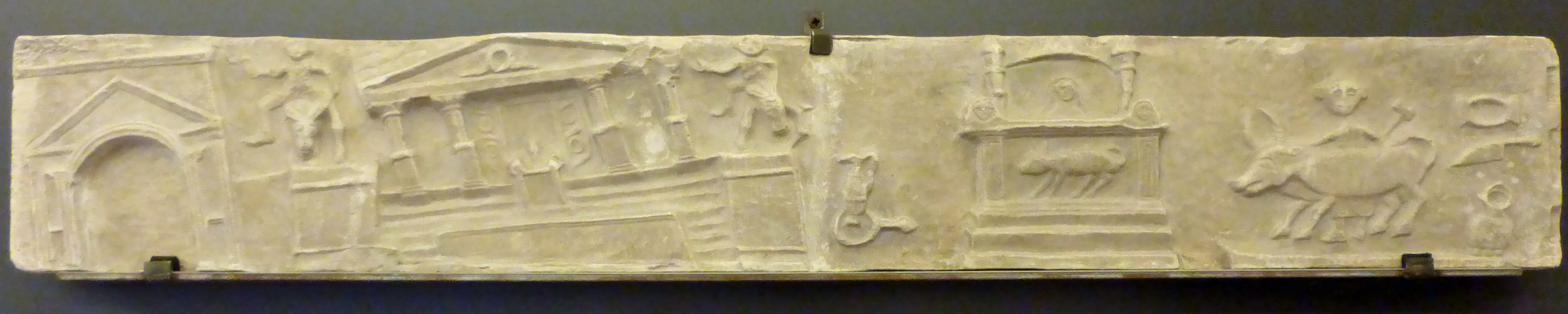
This bas-relief from the lararium of the House of Lucius Caecilius Iucundus shows damage to Pompeii's Temple of Jupiter, during the earthquake of AD 62 in which Iucundus is thought to have died.

The tablets that Iucundus left behind suggest that he died in the earthquake on 5 February 62, since his records stop a few days before that date. His name does not appear in any known inscriptions from the 70s, and he was almost certainly dead by AD 79, by which point he would have been at least seventy.

== Banking in Pompeii ==
Caecilius was a type of banker called an argentarius, which meant that he acted as a middleman in auctions. A typical Pompeian argentarius would pay the vendor for the purchased item and then grant the buyer a time frame in which to repay him. According to the records of Caecilius, mostly dating from the 50s, the buyers had between a few months and a year to repay the loan to the argentarius.

The argentarius would receive interest on the loan, as well as a commission known as a merces. Some argentarii, called coactores argentarii, collected debt money in addition to making arrangements in the auctions, while other argentarii were assisted by coactores who collected the debts for them. It is uncertain whether Caecilius was a coactor argentarius or simply an argentarius.

== Wax tablets ==
Iucundus kept many private records of his business transactions on wax tablets, many of which were found in his house in 1875. The state of these documents has been described as "ruinous": many were charred beyond legibility by the eruption of Vesuvius.

All of the documents are receipts. Of the 153 tablets discovered, two date from AD 15 and 27, and so are likely the records of Iucundus's father Felix; sixteen are receipts for contracts between Iucundus and the city of Pompeii, and the remaining 137 are receipts from auctions on behalf of third parties. Seventeen tablets record loans that Iucundus advanced to buyers of auction items. The tablets testify to the success of Iuncundus' business: all but three record transactions in excess of 1,000 sestertii (HS), while their median value is 4,500 HS and three record deals worth over 30,000 HS. A Roman legionary's annual pay during the same period was 225 denarii, or 900 HS. One receipt of 14 March AD 53 records the payment by Iucundus for a tax farming contract.

In addition to the transaction information, Iucundus's tablets record the names of vendors and witnesses to the arrangements. The lists of witnesses also give some insight into the social structure of Pompeii, since Iucundus had his witnesses sign in order of social status. The tablets include a reference to the freedman Marcus Venerius Secundio, whose tomb in the Porta Sarno necropolis was excavated in 2021. In total, the names of around 115 people (excluding those acting as witnesses) are known from the tablets, of which fourteen — all sellers in auctions — belong to women.

The tablets themselves are mostly triptychs, which means that they have three wooden leaves tied together to make six pages. Wax was put on the inner four pages, and the receipt was written on these surfaces. The tablet was then closed and wrapped with a string, over which the witnesses placed their wax seals. This prevented the document itself from being altered, and there was a brief description of the receipt written on the outside for identification purposes. (Note: Mau 1902, p. 500. To read about the tablets in greater detail and to view pictures of reconstructed tablets, see pp. 499–501 (online version only has text, not images).)

== Inscription from a tablet ==
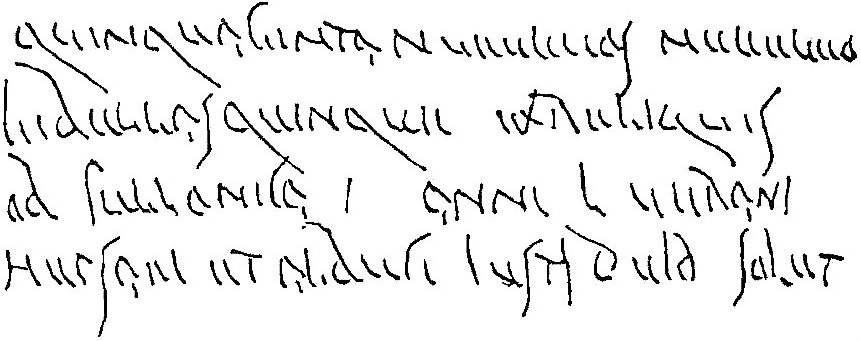
Drawing of the handwriting from one of the tablets found in Iucundus's house (CIL IV, 3340), concerning a fullery.

The following is the translation of an AD 56 receipt for the proceeds of an auction sale. (Note: To view the original Latin inscription and English translation together, see Mau 1902, pp. 502–503.)

Umbricia Ianuaria declared that she had received from L. Caecilius Iucundus 11,039 sesterces, which sum came into the hands of L. Caecilius Iucundus by agreement as the proceeds of an auction sale for Umbricia Ianuaria, the commission due him having been deducted.

Done at Pompeii on the twelfth day of December, in the consulship of Lucius Duvius and Publius Clodius.

Seal of Quintus Appuleius Severus, Marcus Lucretius Lerus, Tiberius Julius Abascantius, M. Julius Crescens, M. Terentius Primus, M. Epidius Hymenaeus, Q. Granius Lesbus, Titus Vesonius Le…., D. Volcius Thallus.

In this inscription, Iucundus included the date and the list of witnesses, which were listed in descending order of social status. By examining several of his tablets, it is possible to determine the relative social standings of clients with whom Iucundus arranged numerous transactions.

== House ==
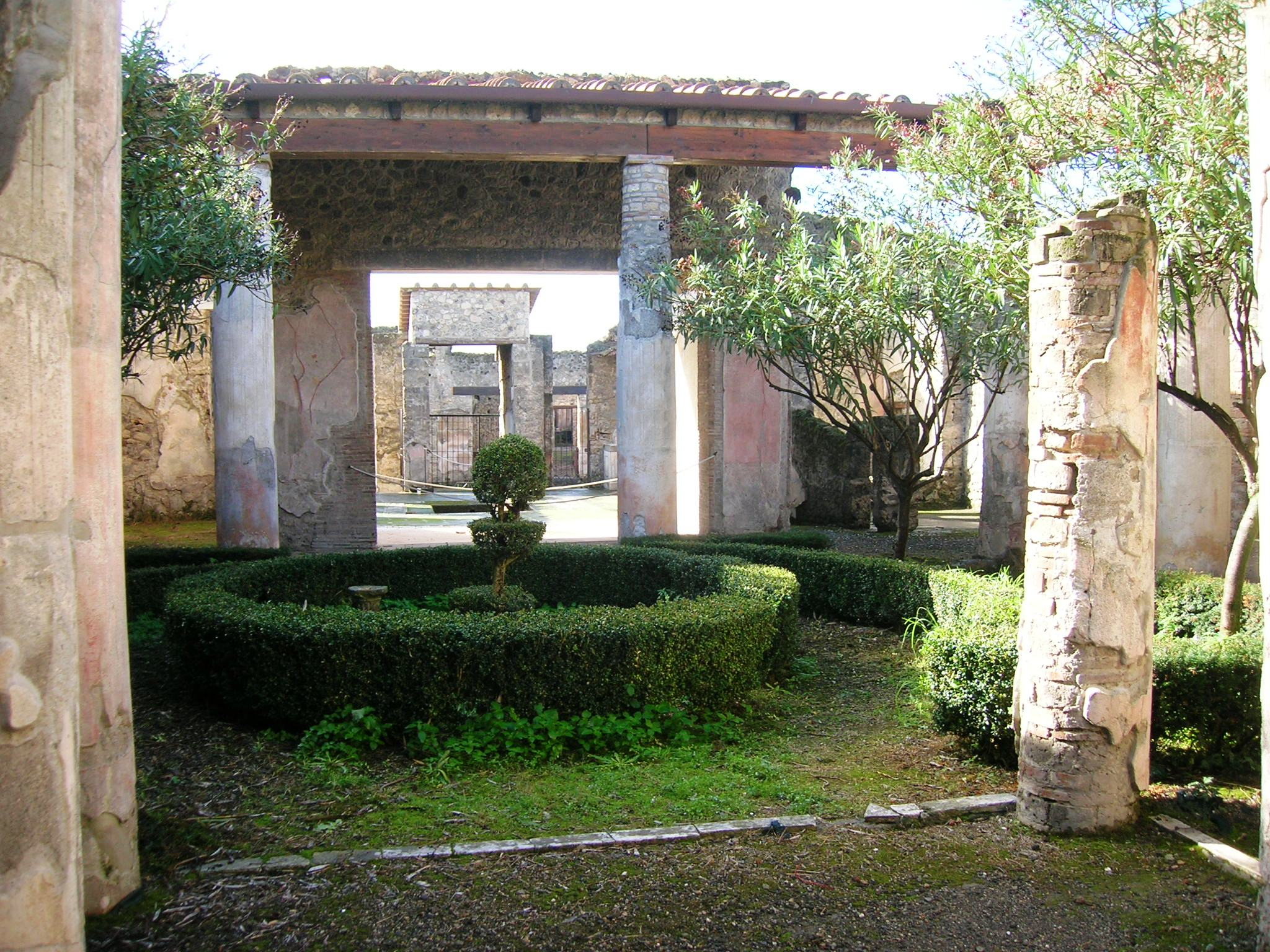
The hortus (garden) of the House of Lucius Caecilius Iucundus

Iucundus' house, known as the House of Lucius Caecilius Iucundus, still stands on what is now called the Via del Vesuvio (Regio V, Insula I) in Pompeii. It is known for the discovery of Iucundus's business records and wax tablets, as well as for its wall-paintings. The lararium, or shrine of the lares, features a relief depicting the Temple of Jupiter during the AD 62 earthquake. The atrium was once decorated with paintings; the floor is decorated with a black and white mosaic and at the entrance a reclining dog is depicted. Most of these images are now displayed in the National Archaeological Museum, Naples.

Several graffiti messages have been found on the walls of the house, including one that reads "May those who love prosper; let them perish who cannot love; let them perish twice over who forbid love." Another, which probably postdates Iucundus's death, proclaims his son Quintus' support for Ceius Secundus, a candidate for the office of duumvir. (Note: Corpus Inscriptionum Latinarum IV.3433)

The tablinum, or study, contains numerous wall paintings. An amphora given by one of his sons, Sextus, to the other, Quintus, was also found in the house.

In 2023 a marble relief depicting the earthquake of AD 62 that was stolen from the domus in 1975 was found in a house in Belgium.

=== Gallery ===
Images of the House of Lucius Caecilius Iucundus
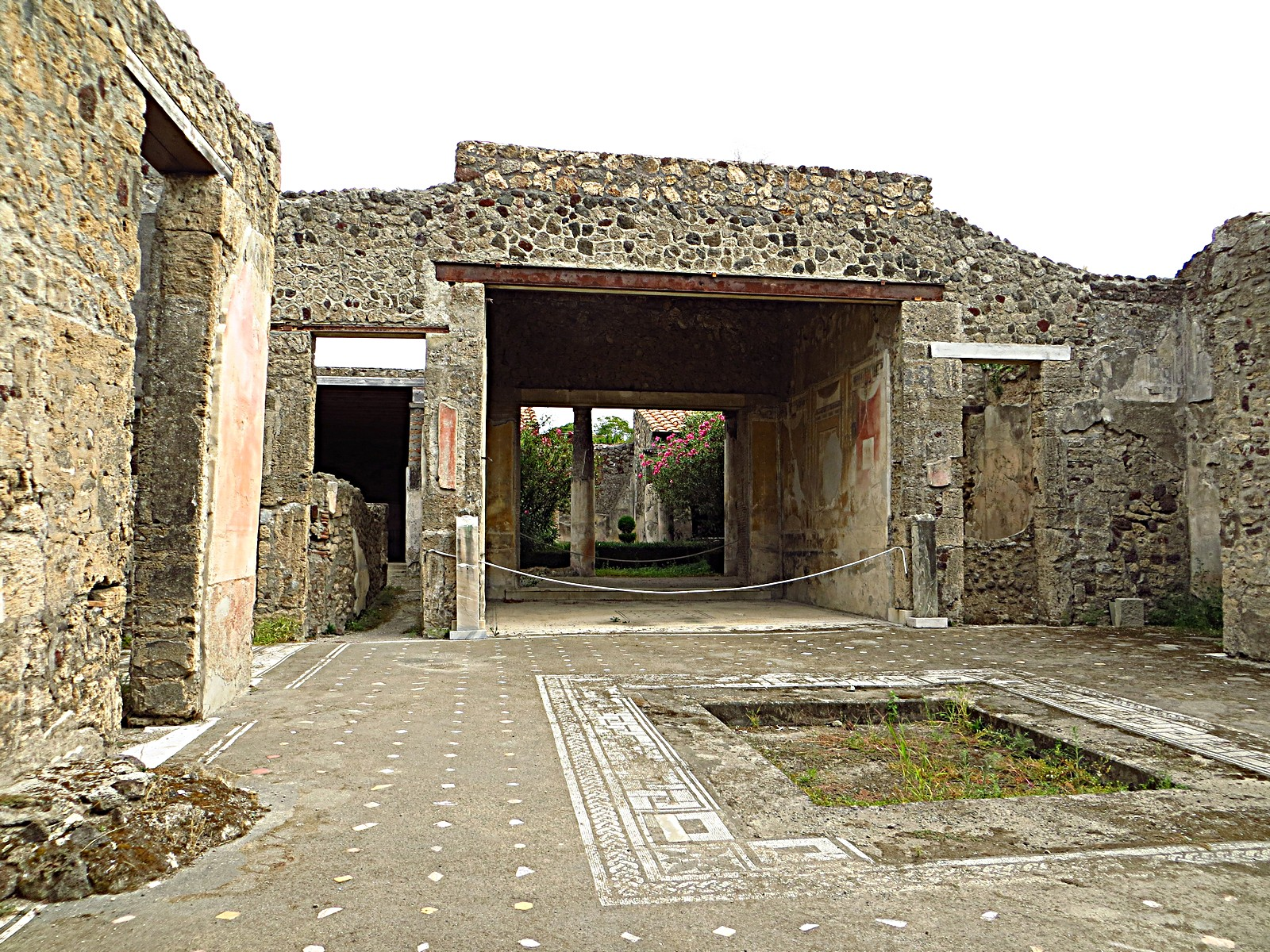
The atrium of the house, where the bust of Iucundus was originally located.

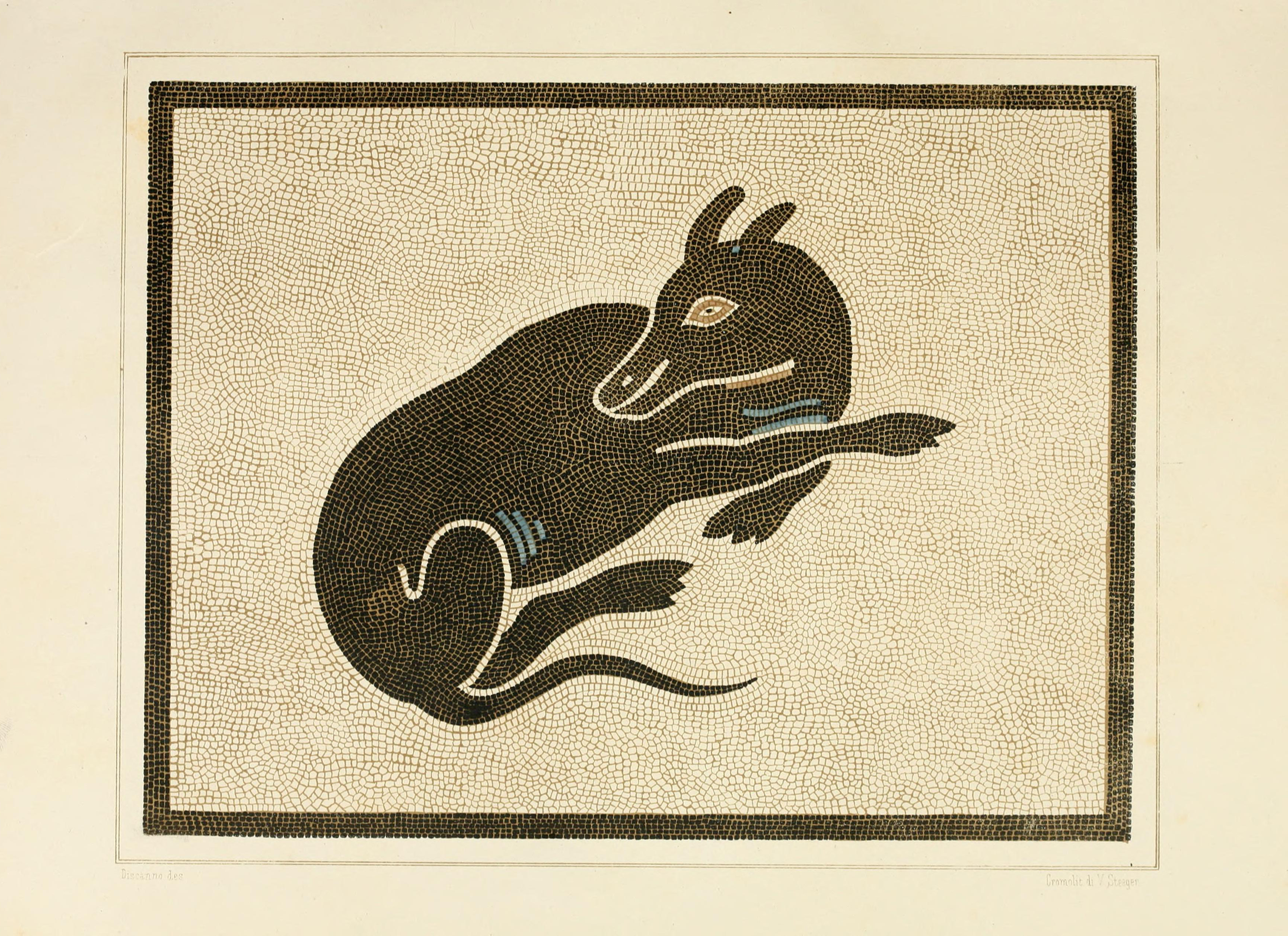
Reconstruction of a mosaic from the entrance of the atrium, showing a reclining dog.

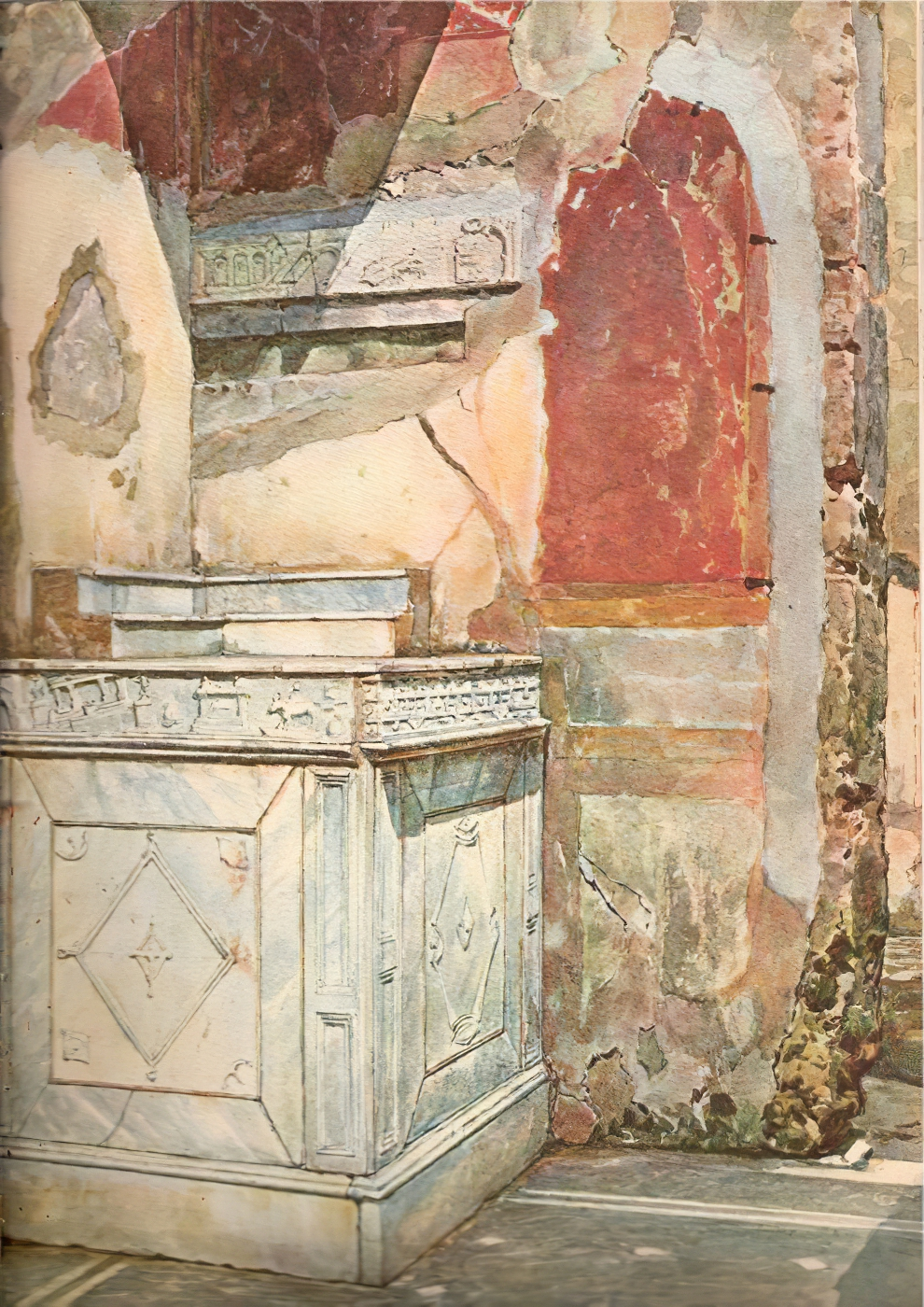
Watercolour of the lararium of the house by Luigi Bazzini.

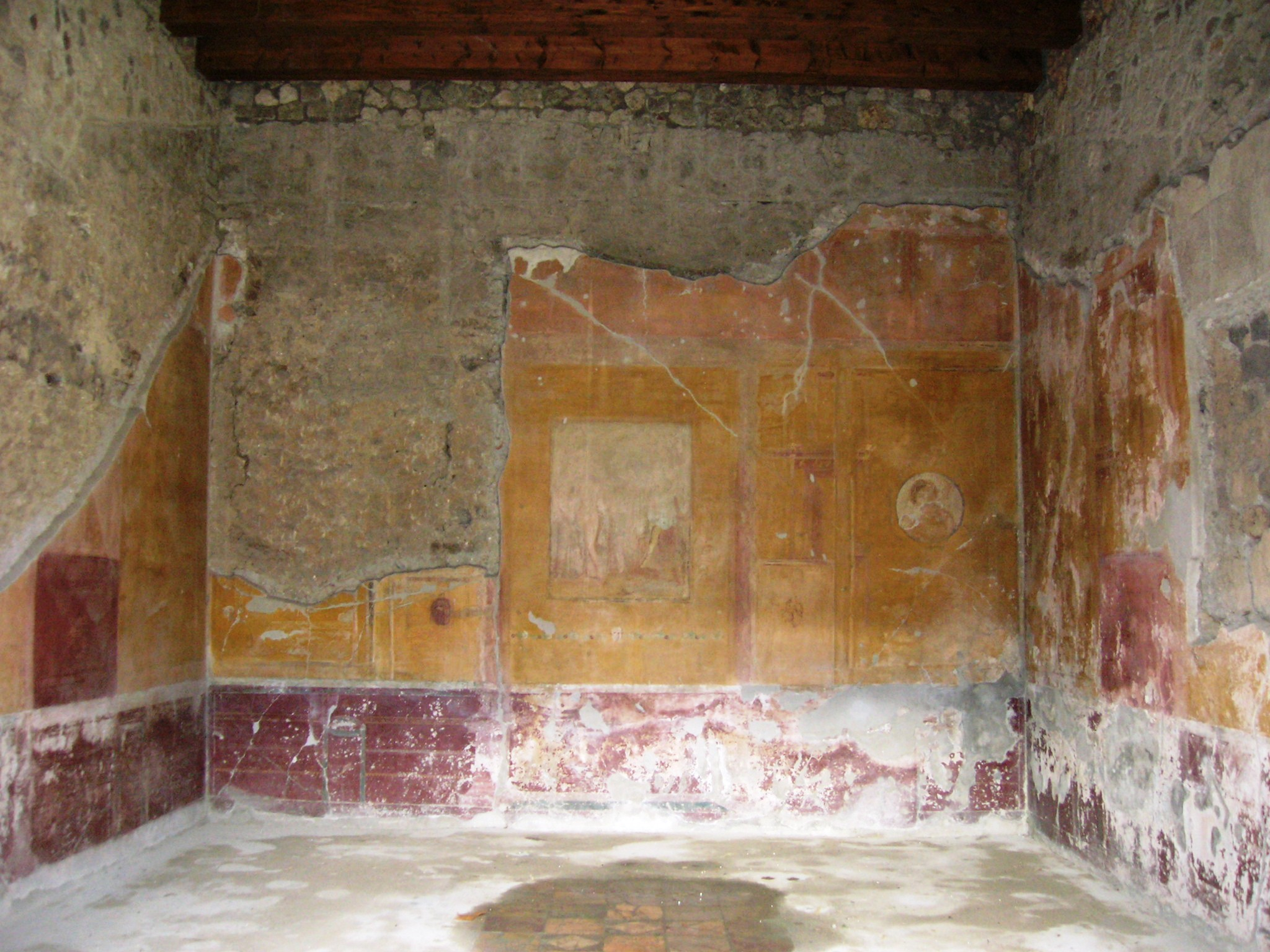
The triclinium of the house, decorated in the Third Pompeiian Style.

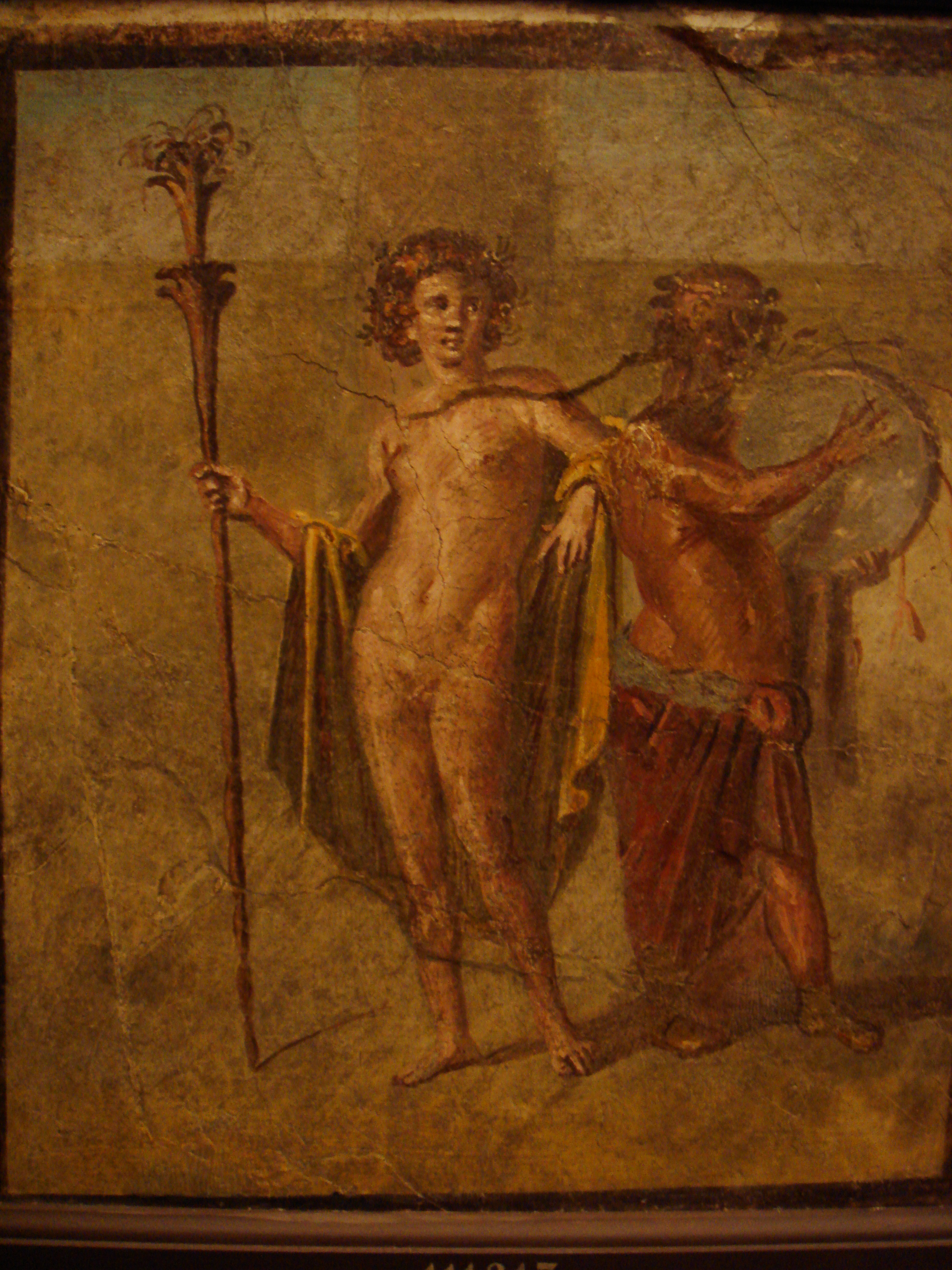
Fresco showing Hermaphroditus and Silenus.

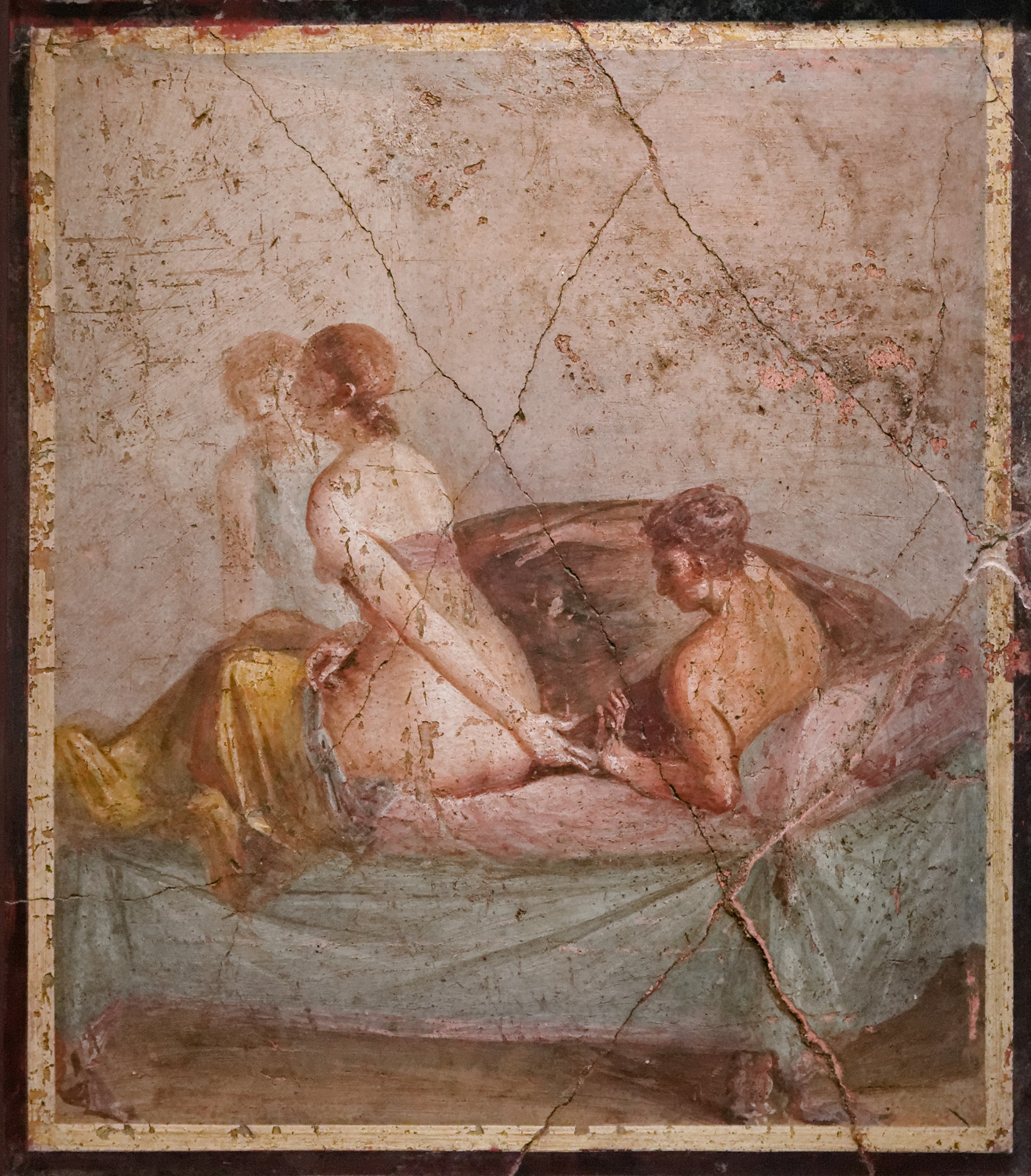
Erotic scene of a man and a woman, formerly displayed in the colonnade of the peristylum.

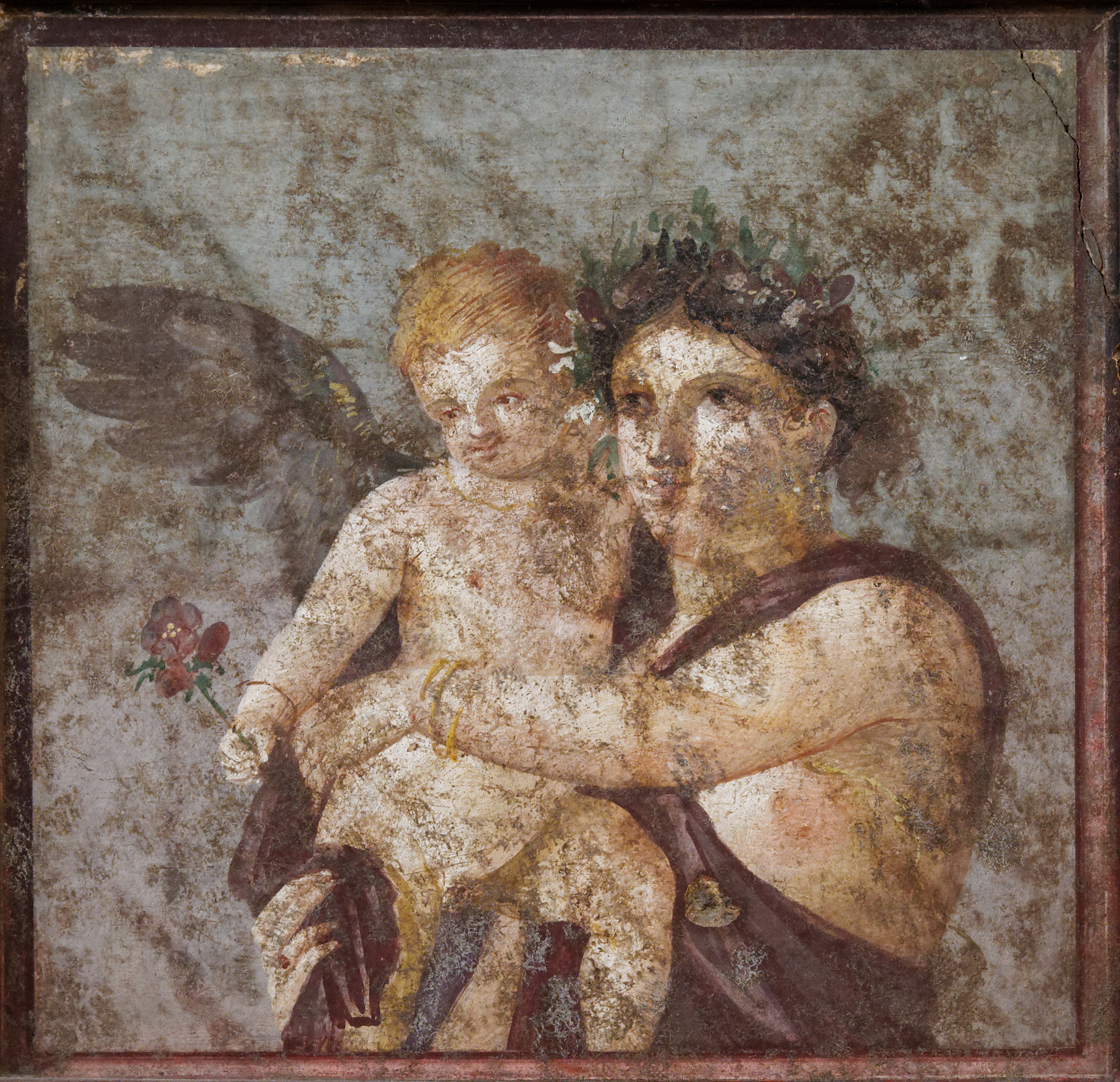
Scene of a maenad and Cupid.

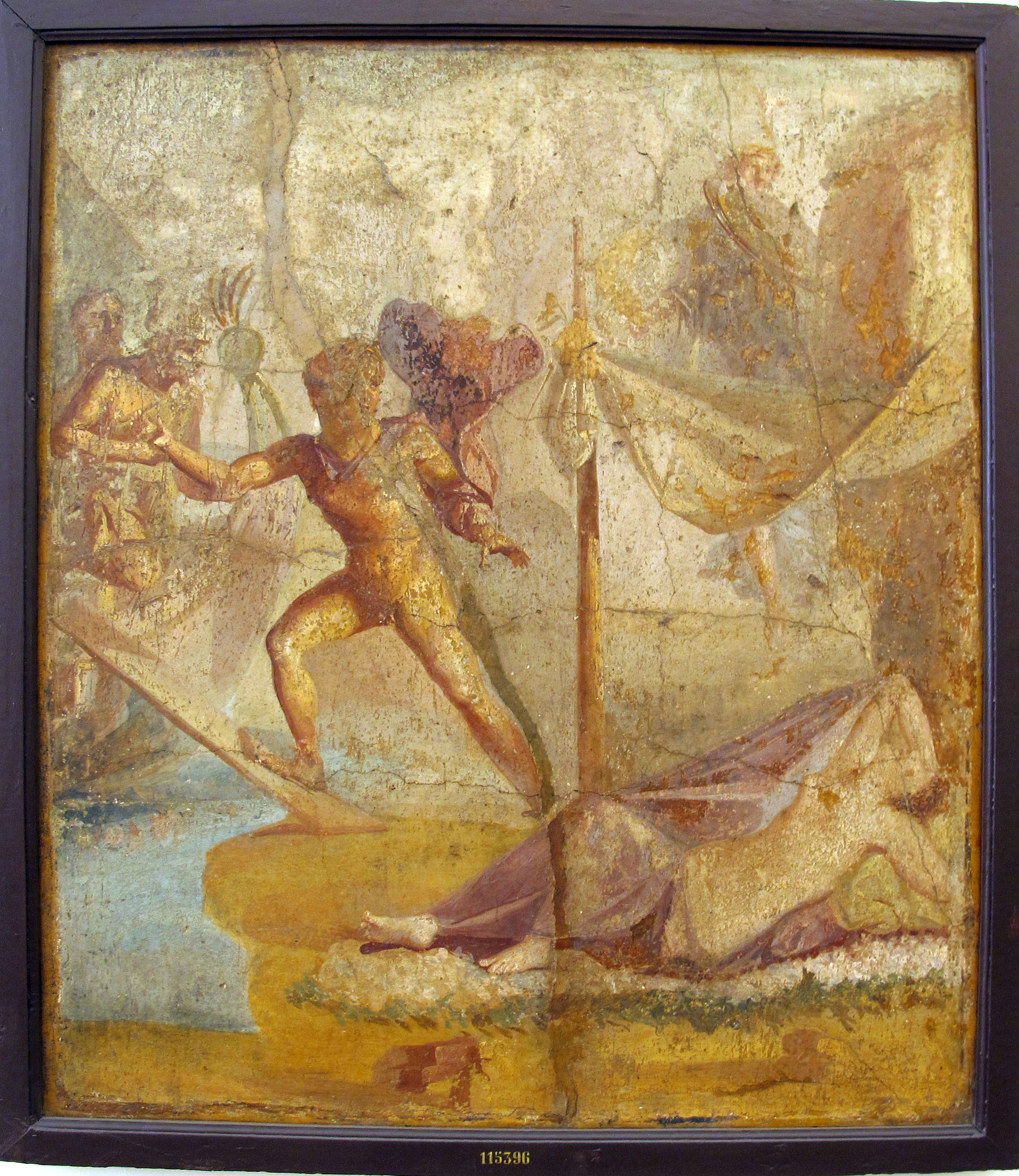
Theseus abandons Ariadne on the island of Naxos.

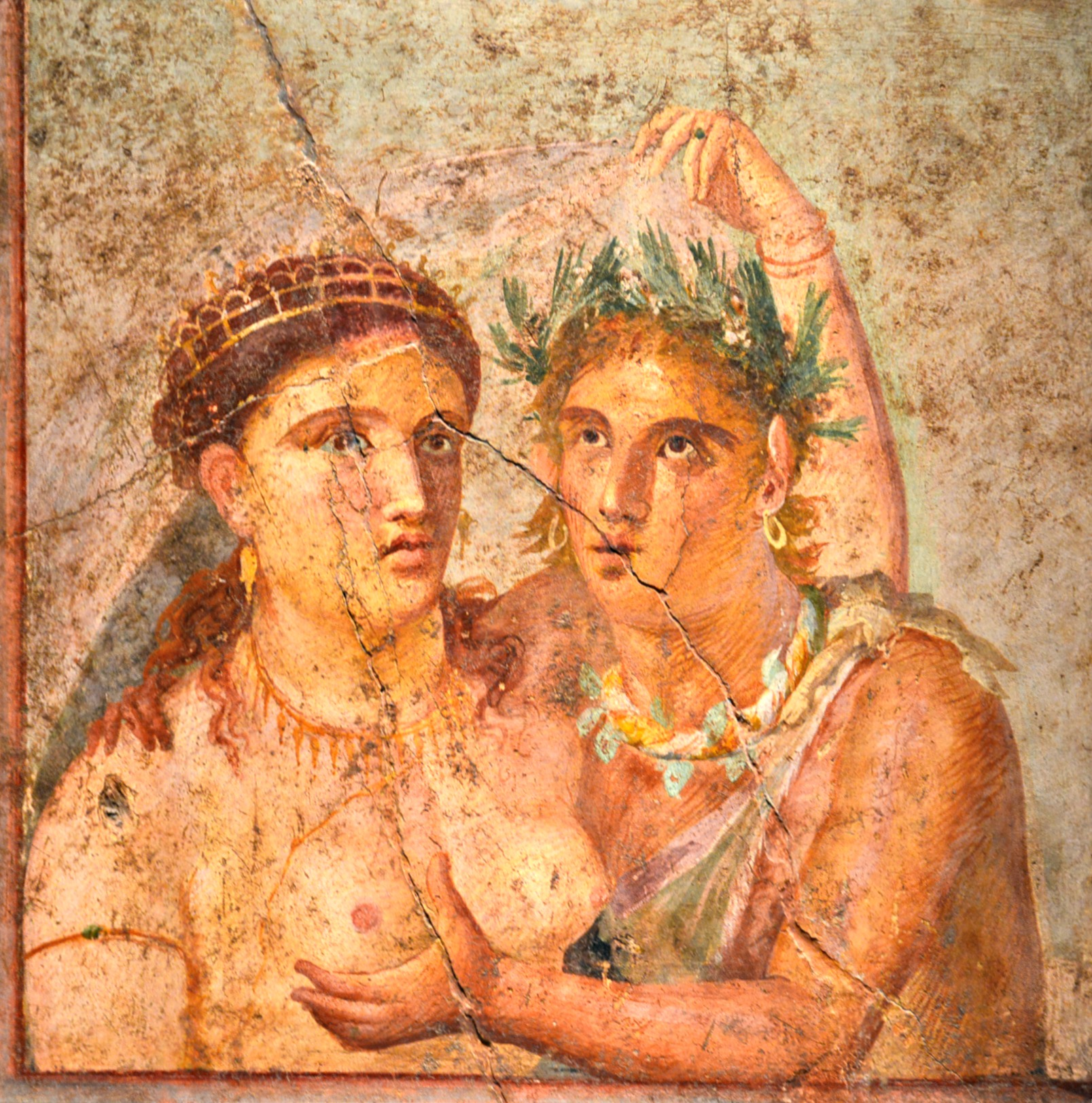
An erotic scene, including a Satyr and a Maenad

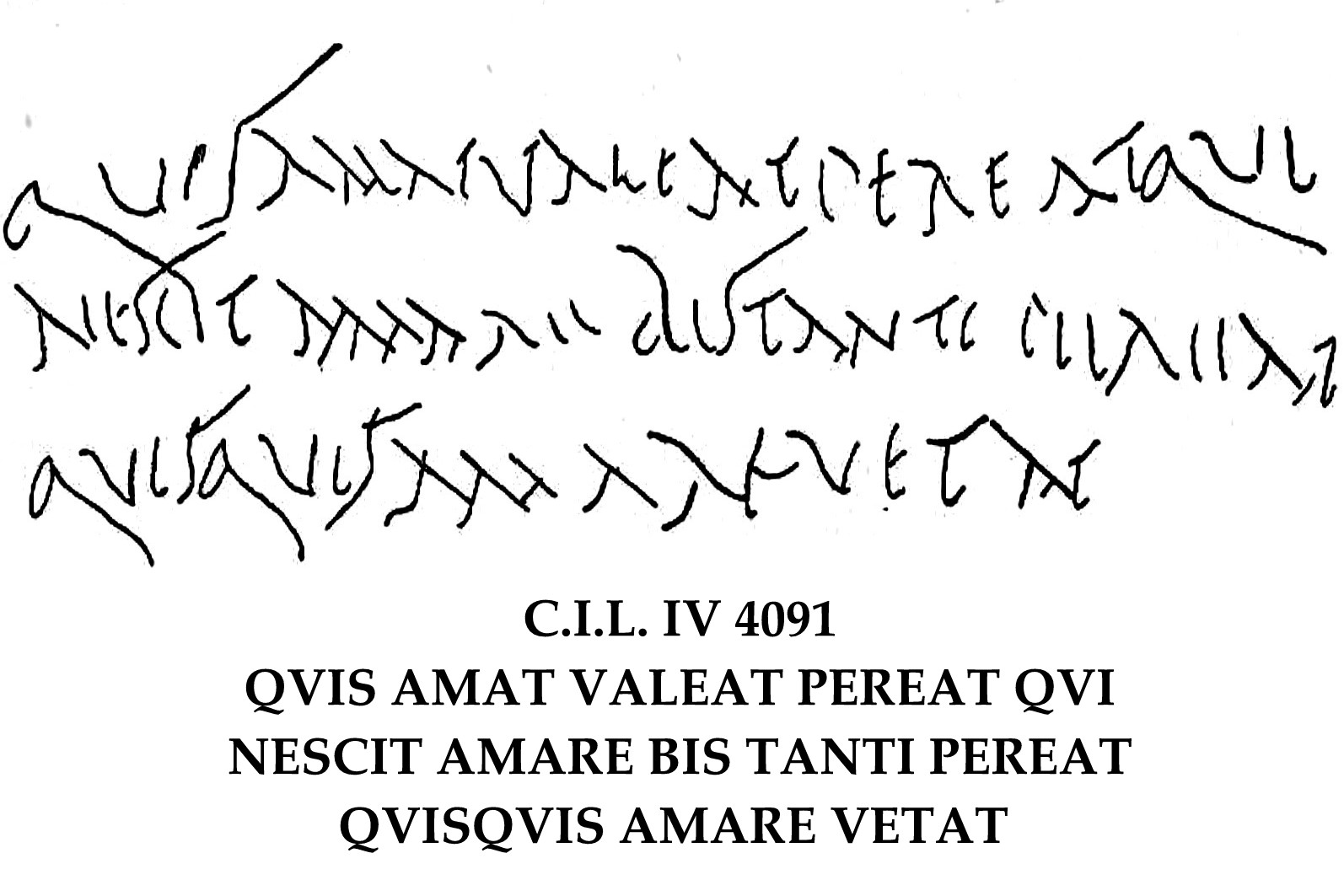
Graffito from the house (CIL IV.4091): an elegiac couplet in praise of love.

== Depictions in fiction ==
The classicist Mary Beard has described Iucundus as "a bit of a breakout star". Book One of the Cambridge Latin Course is a fictionalised account of the life of Iucundus, who is referred to as "Caecilius" in the series. In the Cambridge Latin Course, Caecilius has a wife, Metella; a daughter, Lucia; a dog, Cerberus; and a son, Quintus, on whom books two and three in the series are based. He also has two slaves; one named Clemens and another, a cook, named Grumio. It is also revealed that Caecilius once had another slave, Felix. However, after he saved Quintus from a kidnapping attempt, Caecilius manumitted him. In the Cambridge Latin Course, Caecilius dies in the AD 79 eruption of Vesuvius. In Amarantus and his Neighbourhood, Iucundus appears as a cameo, to aid in the manumitting of the protagonist Amarantus.

Iucundus appears as a character in the 2003 novel Pompeii by Robert Harris. The novel's protagonist, Ampliatus, works for Iucundus; in a 2024 interview, Harris described him as an "enforcer" for the latter. Harris has described Iucundus as an "obvious" inclusion in the story, and as an illustration of the dynamic nature of Roman society.

In a 2008 episode of British television science-fiction series Doctor Who entitled "The Fires of Pompeii", Peter Capaldi portrays Lobus Caecilius, a marble merchant based on Iucundus. In this story, he and his family are saved from the eruption by the Doctor, who transports them to safety. Capaldi later played the Doctor's twelfth iteration; in a 2015 episode, the character explains that he chose to assume Caecilius's appearance to remind him of his duty to save people like Caecilius. The show's writer, Steven Moffat, said that the Doctor's resemblance to Caecilius, as well as to a character named John Frobisher (also played by Capaldi) in the spin-off Torchwood series symbolised "the Doctor's eternal battle with doom and destiny".

== Bibliography ==
- Andreau, Jean (2008) [2000]. "Commerce and Finance". In Bowman, Alan K.; Garnsey, Peter; Rathbone, Dominic (eds.). The Cambridge Ancient History: Volume 11: The High Empire, CE 70–192 (2nd ed.). pp. 769–786. doi:10.1017/CHOL9780521263351. ISBN 9781139054393.
- Andreau, Jean (1999). Banking and business in the Roman world. Translated by Janet Lloyd. Cambridge University Press. ISBN 9780521389327.
- Andreau, Jean (1974). "Les affaires de Monsieur Jucundus". Publications de l'École Française de Rome (in French). 19 (1). Rome: École française de Rome. Archived from the original on 2022-09-22.
- Bartleet, Larry (2015-11-15). "Doctor Who Showrunner Steven Moffat Explains how Peter Capaldi's Doctor Shares a Face with His Other Cameo Parts". NME.
- Beard, Mary (2024-06-11). "The Wolf of Via Vesuvio" (Podcast). Being Roman with Mary Beard. BBC Radio 4.
- Cambridge Latin Course: Book 1 (5th ed.). Cambridge: Cambridge University Press. 2022. ISBN 9781009162647.
- Beard, Mary (2010). Pompeii: The Life of a Roman Town. London: Profile Books. ISBN 9781847650641.
- Butterworth, Alex; Laurence, Ray (2005). Pompeii: The Living City. London: Orion Books. ISBN 0297645609.
- Clements, Peter; Clements, Michael (2009). "House of L. Caecilius Jucundus". AD 79: Destruction and Recovery. Archived from the original on 2023-01-22.
- Lister, Bob (2015). "Exclusively for everyone: to what extent has the Cambridge Latin Course widened access to Latin?". In Archibald, Elizabeth P.; Gnoza, Jonathan; Brockliss, William (eds.). Learning Latin and Greek from Antiquity to the Present. Cambridge University Press. pp. 184–197. ISBN 9781107051645.
- Mau, August (1902). Pompeii: Its Life and Art. Translated by Francis W. Kelsey. New York: MacMillan. OCLC 152397550.
- "Overseas filming for ambitious episode". BBC. 25 September 2007. Archived from the original on 2007-10-11.
- Southern, Pat (2007). The Roman Army: A Social and Institutional History. Oxford University Press. ISBN 9780195328783.
- "The tomb of Marcus Venerius Secundio discovered at Porta Sarno with mummified human remains". Pompeii. Archaeological Site of Pompeii. 2021. Archived from the original on 2022-12-03.
- Waterfield, Bruno (2023-12-20). "Souvenir from Italy turns out to be priceless Pompeii relic". The Times.
- Wolf, Joseph Georg (2015). "Documents in Roman Practice". In Johnston, David (ed.). The Cambridge Companion to Roman Law. Cambridge University Press. pp. 61–85. ISBN 9780521895644.
- Woolf, Greg (2008) [2000]. "Literacy". In Bowman, Alan K.; Garnsey, Peter; Rathbone, Dominic (eds.). The Cambridge Ancient History: Volume 11: The High Empire, CE 70–192 (2nd ed.). pp. 875–897. doi:10.1017/CHOL9780521263351. ISBN 9781139054393.
- Zanker, Paul (1998). Pompeii: Public and Private Life. Translated by Deborah Lucas Schneider. Cambridge, MA: Harvard University Press. ISBN 9780674689671.
- Lawrence, Caroline; Jenkinson-Brown, Laura (2021). Amarantus and his Neighbourhood. Cambridge School Classics Project. ISBN 978-1800681552.
