= Quintus Caecilius Iucundus =

1st century AD son of wealthy Roman banker Lucius Caecilius Iucundus

Quīntus Caecilius Iucundus
- Cambridge Latin Course character
- First appearance: Cambridge Latin Course, Book I
- Last appearance: Cambridge Latin Course Book V

In-universe information
- Gender: Male
- Occupation: Student
- Relatives: Lucius Caecilius Iucundus (father), Metella (mother), Rufilla (wife of Salvius), Lucia (sister, from 5th edition)
- Nationality: Roman

Quintus Caecilius Iucundus was the son of Lucius Caecilius Iucundus, a banker who lived in the Roman town of Pompeii around AD 14–62.

A relatively obscure historical figure, Quintus Caecilius Iucundus is most notable as a major character in the Cambridge Latin Course, set in the Ancient Roman Empire. In the series, he is primarily known as 'Quintus'; his father is known as 'Caecilius' and his mother as 'Metella'. On the death of Caecilius in the AD 79 eruption of Vesuvius, Quintus becomes the protagonist of books two and three, and returns briefly in book five.

== Quintus in the Cambridge Latin Course ==
In the first volume of the Cambridge Latin Course, the reader finds Quintus as a teenager in Pompeii, in AD 78, the year before it is destroyed by Mount Vesuvius. As Caecilius is dying, he sends his slave Clemens to find Quintus, and give him the rights to Caecilius' property and fortune. The family dog, Cerberus, dies in the final story.

In the second volume, the reader finds Quintus in Roman Britain, living in the house of a distant relative named Salvius, based on the historical Gaius Salvius Liberalis. They experience several adventures together and with other inhabitants of Britain, including Cogidubnus (known as 'Togidubnus' in the 5th edition), the client king of the Cantiaci. Most of Book Two consists of Quintus' retelling of his past to Cogidubnus, particularly his time in Alexandria, in Roman Egypt, where Quintus freed his slave Clemens and befriended Barbillus, a wealthy Roman. When Barbillus died, he tasks Quintus to find his estranged son and heir, Rufus, in Britain.

In the third volume, Quintus and Salvius become enemies, as Salvius plots to kill Cogidubnus. Salvius accuses Quintus of treason, but Quintus attempts to foil the murder by informing the Roman governor, Agricola, of Salvius treachery. Along the way, Quintus finds Rufus, who turns out to be a loyal ally, and gives him the letter from Barbillus. In Book Four, the plot moves to Rome. Quintus is not present, and he does not appear again until the last stories of the fifth volume, when Salvius goes on trial. Quintus provides crucial testimony which reveals Salvius' crimes and leads, at least apparently, to the latter's political downfall.

== Historical figure ==
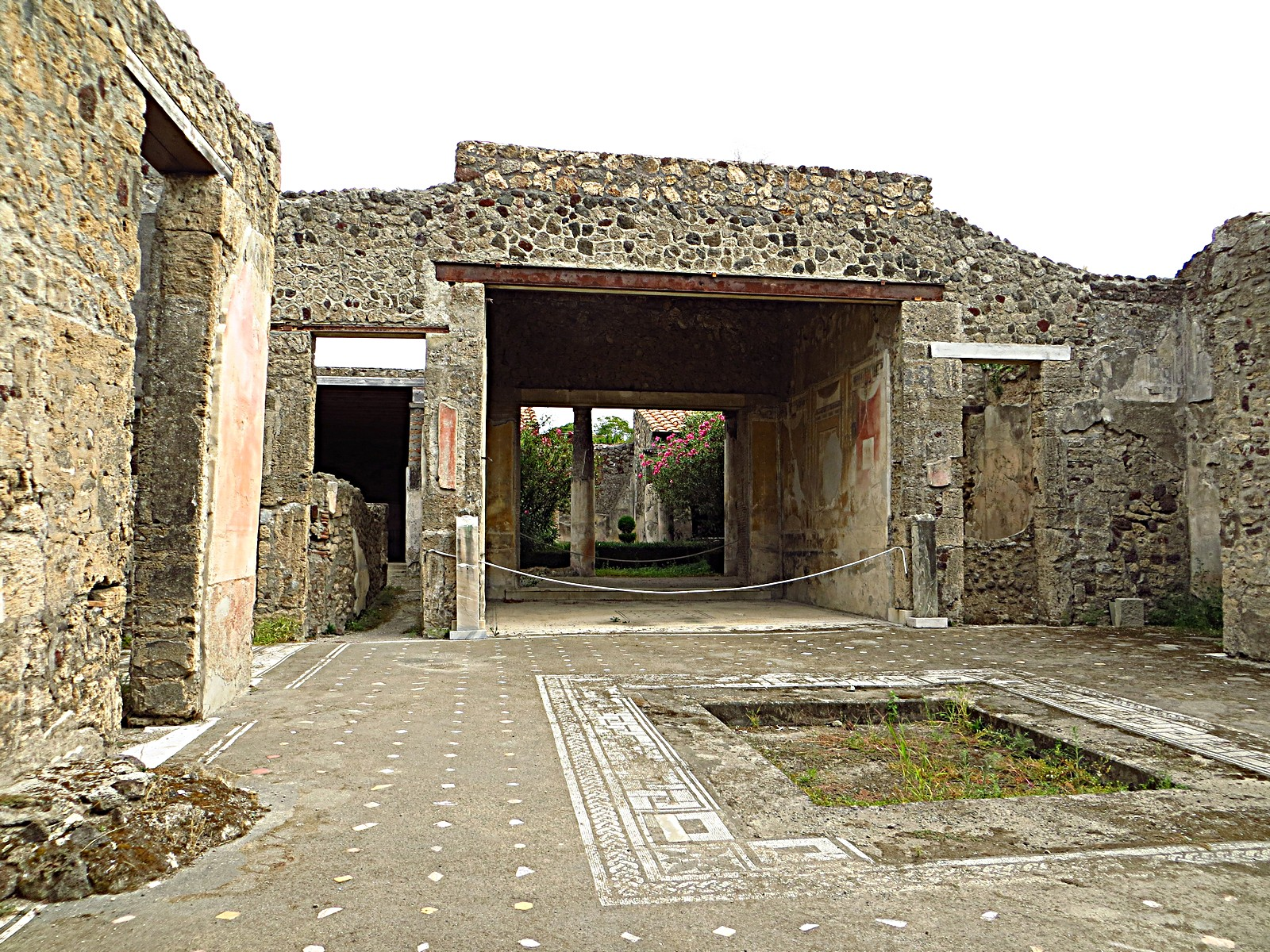
The House of Lucius Caecilius Iucundus in Pompeii, where Quintus Caecilius Iucundus lived. An inscription of his name upon the wall is the only known attestation of his name.

Little is known of the historical Quintus Caecilius Iucundus. His paternal grandfather, Felix, had been a freedman of the gens Caecilia and a banker in Pompeii.

Quintus Caecilius' name is known from an electoral notice painted onto his family home, the House of Lucius Caecilius Iucundus, in which he expressed support for the candidacy of Ceius Secundus for duumvir. (Note: Corpus Inscriptionum Latinarum IV.3433) The same inscription records the name of his brother, Sextus, of whom nothing else is known: Sextus is believed to have been the younger of the two. It is possible that Quintus held the cognomen Metellus, as did his brother, apparently granted by their father to suggest a connection with the prestigious Caecilii Metelli.

Since Caecilius' banking business appears to have been abandoned on his likely death in AD 62, it is considered likely that Quintus and Sextus did not follow their father into the profession.

== See also ==
- Caecilia gens
- "The Fires of Pompeii", a Doctor Who episode where Quintus, Lucius, and Metella are characters

=== Real people with similar names ===
- Quintus Caecilius Metellus (consul 206 BC) (250–175 BC)
- Quintus Caecilius Metellus (palace owner) (born c. 130 BC)

== Bibliography ==
- Andreau, Jean (1974). Les affaires de Monsieur Jucundus (in French). Rome: École française de Rome. Archived from the original on 2022-09-22.
- Butterworth, Alex; Laurence, Ray (2005). Pompeii: The Living City. London: Orion Books. ISBN 0297645609.
