= Jean Andreau =

French historian (born 1960)

Jean Andreau is a French historian, former student of the École normale supérieure (1960) and former member of the École française de Rome. As of 2016, he is research director at the EHESS.

He was a student of both Pierre Grimal, Julien Guey and Claude Nicolet.

His research work focusses on economy and society in the ancient Roman world, and above all from the 3rd B.C to the 3rd A.C, and thinking about the old economy and the historical pre-industrial economies.

== Bibliography ==
=== 3rd cycle thesis ===
- Les affaires de Monsieur Jucundus, EFR, Rome, 1974

=== State thesis ===
- La vie financière dans le monde romain : les métiers de manieurs d'argent : IVe – IIIe après Jésus-Christ, EFR, Rome, 1987

=== Monographs ===
- 1997: Patrimoines, échanges et prêts d'argent : l'économie romaine , "L'Erma" di Bretschneider, Rome
- 2001: La banque et les affaires dans le monde romain [Texte imprimé] : IVe BC – IIIe AC , Le Seuil
- In collaboration with Raymond Descat: Esclave en Grèce et à Rome, Hachette Littératures
- 2010: L'économie du monde romain, Ellipses

== Direction of works ==
- La dette publique dans l’Histoire, J. Andreau, G. Béaur et J.-Y. Grenier (dir.), Paris, CHEFF, 2006.

Coordination du dossier "Quoi de neuf en histoire ancienne ?", Cahiers du Centre de recherches historiques, n° 37, April 2006.

- Participation à la coordination du Dictionnaire de l’Antiquité, under the direction of J. Leclant, Paris, P.U.F., 2005.

=== Symposia ===
- Under his direction in collaboration with Hinnerk Bruhns, Parenté et stratégies familiales dans l'antiquité romaine : actes de la table ronde des 2-4 octobre 1986, Paris, EFR, Rome, 1990
- Under his direction in collaboration with Erik Aerts and Peter Ørsted, Models of regional economies in Antiquity and the Middle Ages to the 11th century: Session B-11: proceedings, Tenth International Economic History Congress, Leuven, August 1990, Leuven University Press, Louvain, 1990
- Under his in collaboration with Pierre Briant and Raymond Descat, Les échanges dans l'Antiquité : le rôle de l'État. Entretiens d'archéologie et d'histoire, 6 and 7 May 1994, Saint-Bertrand-de-Comminges, Musée archéologique départemental, Saint-Bertrand-de-Comminges, 1994
- Under his direction in collaboration with Pierre Briant and Raymond Descat Économie antique : prix et formation des prix dans les économies antiques :Rencontres sur l'économie antique, Saint-Bertrand-de-Comminges, 1996, Musée archéologique départemental, Saint-Bertrand-de-Comminges, 1997
- Under his direction in collaboration with Pierre Briant and Raymond Descat Économie antique : la guerre dans les économies antiques : 3rd rencontres sur l'économie antique, Saint-Bertrand-de-Comminges, 6-8 mai 1999, Musée archéologique départemental, Saint-Bertrand-de-Comminges, 2000
- Under his direction in collaboration with Catherine Virlouvet L'information et la mer dans le monde antique, EFR, Rome, 2002
- Under his direction in collaboration with Hinnerk Bruhns Sociologie économique et économie de l'antiquité : à propos de Max Weber, Centre de recherches historiques, Paris, 2004
- Under his direction in collaboration with Jérôme France and Sylvie Pittia, Mentalités et choix économiques des Romains, de Boccard, Paris, 2004
- Under his direction in collaboration with Véronique Chankowski, Vocabulaire et expression de l'économie dans le monde antique, de Boccard, Paris, 2007
- Under his direction in collaboration with Wladimir Berelowitch, Michel Ivanovitch Rostovtzeff, Edipuglia, Bari, 2008

=== Edition of sources ===
- In collaboration with Henri Broise and Fiorenzo Catalli, Musarna. 1, Les trésors monétaires, EFR, Rome, 2002

== Articles ==
- Le système monétaire partiellement ‘fermé’ de l’Égypte romaine, in "L’exception égyptienne ? Production et échanges monétaires en Égypte hellénistique et romaine", Frédérique Duyrat and Olivier Picard, Cairo, IFAO, 2005, (pp. 329–338).
- L’Agricola de Biha Bilta, ‘qui s’est acquitté de sa ferme’, in Territoires et paysages de l’Âge de Fer au Moyen Âge, Mélanges offerts à Philippe Leveau, A. Bouet et Fl. Verdin, Bordeaux, Ausonius, 2005, (pp. 243–246).
- Une cité prospère de Campanie, L’Histoire, n° 288, June 2004, (pp. 52–55).
- Esclavage antique et rentabilité économique, in J. Andreau et H. Bruhns (dir.), "Sociologie économique et économie de l’Antiquité, À propos de Max Weber", Cahiers du Centre de Recherches Historiques, n° 34, October 2004, (pp. 159–166).
- L’irrésistible célébration des élites municipales, in M. Cébeillac-Gervasoni, L. Lamoine and Fr. Trément (dir.), Autocélébration des élites locales dans le monde romain, Contexte, Textes, Images (IIe BC – IIIe A.C), Clermont-Ferrand, Centre de Recherches sur les Civilisations Antiques, 2004, (pp. 527–534).
- "John d’Arms and the Economic interests of the Roman Elite", in A. Gallina Zevi and J. H. Humphrey (dir.), Ostia, Cicero, Gamala, Feasts & the Economy, Papers in Memory of John H. d’Arms, Portsmouth (Rh. I.), 2004, (pp. 137–141).
- Structure et fonction du livre de comptes de Kellis, Comptes rendus de l'Académie des inscriptions et belles-lettres, 2004 (January–March), (pp. 431–443).
- Remarques conclusives, dans le cadre du dossier "Les élites locales et la terre à l’époque romaine", Histoire et sociétés rurales, n° 19, 1er semestre 2003, (pp. 151–157).
- Vie financière dans les deux moitiés de l’Empire romain : remarques comparatives, in "Laurea internationalis, Festschrift für Jochen Bleicken zum 75. Geburtstag", under the direction of Th. Hantos, Wiesbaden, Franz Steiner, 2003, (pp. 9–25).
- Présence des cités et des hiérarchies civiques dans les tablettes de Pompéi, in Tâches publiques et entreprise privée dans le monde romain, Jean-Jacques Aubert (dir.), Geneva, Droz, 2003, (pp. 229–248).
- ""Les commerçants, l’élite et la politique romaine à la fin de la République IIIe – Ie)"", in C. Zaccagnini (dir.), Mercanti e politica nel mondo antico, Rome, "L’Erma", 2003, (pp. 217–243).
