= Jean-Michel David =

French historian

Jean-Michel David (1947, Paris) is a French historian, a specialist of political, social and cultural history of the Roman Republic.

Jean-Michel David's work particularly focusses on the history of Italy in the last two centuries BC, the study of political staff of the Roman Republic, the history of social behaviors and cultural practices and the construction of the exemplary and collective memory.

== Career ==
- Assistant at the université de Caen
- Member of the École française de Rome
- Chargé de recherche at the CNRS
- Maître de conférences at the Paris West University Nanterre La Défense
- Professor at the université de Strasbourg
- Professor at the université Paris I Panthéon-Sorbonne

== Principal publications ==
- 1992: Le Patronat judiciaire au dernier siècle de la République romaine, Rome
- 1997: La Romanisation de l'Italie. Champs (in French). Paris: Flammarion. 1997. ISBN 978-2-0808-1381-7.
- 1997: (éd.) Die späte römische Republik, la fin de la République romaine. Un débat franco-allemand d'histoire et d'historiographie, Rome, (in collaboration with H. Bruhns and Wilfried Nippel).
- 1998: (dir.) Valeurs et Mémoire à Rome, Valère Maxime ou la vertu recomposée, Paris
- 2000: La République romaine, de la deuxième guerre punique à la bataille d'Actium (218-31);Crise d'une aristocratie. Nouvelle Histoire de l'Antiquité (in French). Paris: Le Seuil. 2000. ISBN 2-02-023959-0.
