= Marcus Venerius Secundio =

Pompeiian freedman and theatrical producer (c. 79 CE)

Marcus Venerius Secundio was a Roman impresario who produced plays in Greek and Latin, and a custodian of the temple of Venus at Pompeii. Marcus was a former slave, who, after his manumission, applied himself to organizing theatrical performances. He enjoyed financial success, improving his social standing, and garnering prestige. Marcus lived in the 1st century: he was probably born around the beginning of the Christian era and died a few years before the eruption of Mount Vesuvius in 79. Analysis of his remains suggests that he was about 60 years old when he died. His name occurs in the wax tablet archive of his contemporary, the banker Caecilius Iucundus. The discovery of Marcus having put on performances in Greek is strong evidence that ancient Greek must have been an accessible language, along with classical Latin in ancient Rome.

== Discovery ==
Marcus's remains were found in early August 2021 in a spacious tomb, which had been opened in mid-July during excavations in the Porta Sarno Necropolis area in Pompeii. At the time, the area where the tomb was found was not yet open to the public. Director Gabriel Zuchtriegel intends eventually to open the area to visitors. Excavations began in July 2021 under the leadership of Llorenç Alapont, professor of Prehistory and Archaeology at the University of Valencia. The remains were discovered by Alapont and archaeologist Luana Toniolo, in collaboration with anthropologist Valeria Amoretti of the Archaeological Park of Pompeii. The team was also joined by two groups of undergraduates organized by ArchaeoSpain.

== Tomb and remains ==
The tomb consists of a cell of 1.6 x 2.4 metres within a larger enclosure; the facade of the enclosure has traces of murals showing green plants on a blue background. Marcus's skeletal remains, found in the cell, were in good condition. A small part of the scalp had been mummified, with white hair and the left ear still clearly visible. Why part of him was mummified, and whether this is the result of intentional treatment, are questions that require further research. The survival of Marcus' remains is remarkable, since it was the usual practice for Romans to cremate their dead. The enclosure also contained two cremation urns, one belonging to a woman named Novia Amabilis, and various grave goods.

== Commemorative plaque ==
On the pediment of the tomb a marble commemorative plaque was mounted, which briefly describes Marcus and his activities.

MVENERIVSCOLONIAE
LꟾBSECVNDIOAEDITVVS
VENERIS · AVGVSTÁLISETMIN
EÓRVM · HICSOLVSLV́DOSGRAÉCOS
ETLATꟾNOSQVADRIDVODEDIT

— Original text (Latin)

MARCUS VENERIUS COLONIAE
LIBERTUS SECUNDIO AEDITUUS
VENERIS AUGUSTĀLIS ET MINISTER
EŌRUM HIC SOLUS LŪDOS GRAÉCOS
ET LATINOS QUADRIDUO DEDIT

— Modern spelling; without abbreviations

Marcus Venerius, of the colony
a freedman, Secundio, keeper
of the temple of Venus, Augustalis and servant
of them [the Augustales], here [in Pompeii], on his own, plays in Greek
and Latin during four days he gave.

— English translation

== Hypothesis ==
The archaeological team of the University of Valencia hypothesize that Marcus was born in Greece. This might explain why he produced theatrical performances in Greek, and might also explain why his remains were not cremated. The Greeks believed that life after death was only possible if the body had been buried.

== Links ==
- Pompeii - The tomb of Marcus Venerius Secundio discovered at Porta Sarno with mummified human remains - The discovery of Marcus' tomb.
- YouTube - Pompeii Sites - Director of the Archaeological Park Pompeii, Gabriel Zuchtriegel, describes the tomb (In Italian; English subtitles are available)
