= Dominic Rathbone =

British historian

Dominic William Rathbone is British historian who is professor of ancient history at King's College London. He is a specialist in Greek and Roman Egypt, particularly as recorded on papyri, and is president of the Society for the Promotion of Roman Studies.

== Education ==
Rathbone read classics at Jesus College, Cambridge, where he also completed his PhD on the Heroninos archive of texts from an agricultural estate in the Roman Fayum. His thesis was published as Economic Rationalism and Rural Society in Third Century AD Egypt by Cambridge University Press in 1991.

== Research ==
Rathbone is a specialist in Graeco-Roman Egypt, particularly as recorded on papyri, and is chairman of the Oxyrhynchus Papyri Management Committee of the Egypt Exploration Society. He has a special interest in trade and banking, combining archaeological evidence, papyri evidence, and ancient texts in his research. He directed a surface survey of Graeco-Roman villages in the Fayyum, Egypt, in 1995–1998. Rathbone also studies the early Roman Republic and the political and agrarian History of the middle republic.

== Appointments ==
Rathbone is president of the Society for the Promotion of Roman Studies.

== Selected publications ==
- Economic Rationalism and Rural Society in Third-Century A.D. Egypt: The Heroninos Archive and the Appianus Estate. Cambridge, Cambridge University Press, 1991, pp.xix + 489.
- Egypt from Alexander to the Copts: an Archaeological and Historical Guide. London, 2004. (Edited with R.S. Bagnall)
- "Financial intermediation in first-century AD Rome and eighteenth-century England", (in) ed. K. Verboven, K. Vandorpe & V. Chankowski, Pistoi dia tèn technèn. Bankers, Loans and Archives in the Ancient World. Studies in Honour of Raymond Bogaert. Leuven, 2008, pp. 371–419. (with P. Temin)
- "Poor peasants and silent sherds", (in) ed. L. de Ligt & S. Northwood, People, Land and Politics. Demographic Developments and the Transformation of Roman Italy, 300 BC - AD 14. Leiden, 2008, pp. 305–32.
- "Earnings and costs: living standards and the Roman economy (first to third centuries AD)", (in) ed. A. Bowman & A. Wilson, Quantifying the Roman Economy. Methods and Problems. Oxford, 2009, pp. 299–326.
