= Mélanges de l'École française de Rome =

- Discipline: History
- Language: French

Publication details
- Former name: Mélanges d'archéologie et d'histoire
- History: 1881–present
- Publisher: École française de Rome (France)

Standard abbreviations
- ISO 4: Mélanges Éc. Fr. Rome

The Mélanges de l'École française de Rome is a journal of history and archeology published by the École française de Rome.

== History ==
First published under the title Mélanges d'archéologie et d'histoire from 1881 to 1970, there are now several series:

- Mélanges de l'École française de Rome: Antiquité (MEFRA) (1971–present)
- Mélanges de l'Ecole française de Rome: Moyen Âge, Temps Modernes (MEFRM) (1971–1988)
- Mélanges de l'École française de Rome: Moyen Âge (MEFRM) (1989–present)
- Mélanges de l'École française de Rome: Italie et Méditerranée (MEFRIM) (1971–2012)
- Mélanges de l'École française de Rome: Italie et Méditerranée modernes et contemporaines (MEFRIM) (2013–present)
