= AD 62 Pompeii earthquake =

Earthquake in Italy in AD 62

- Location within Italy
- Local date: 5 February 62
- Magnitude: 5.2–6.1
- Epicentre: 40.7°N 14.5°E
- Areas affected: Roman Empire, Campania
- Max. intensity: MMI IX (Violent) – MMI X (Extreme)

On 5 February AD 62, an earthquake of an estimated magnitude of between 5 and 6 and a maximum intensity of IX or X on the Mercalli scale struck the towns of Pompeii and Herculaneum, severely damaging them. The earthquake may have been a precursor to the eruption of Mount Vesuvius in AD 79, which destroyed the same two towns. The contemporary philosopher and dramatist Seneca the Younger wrote an account of the earthquake in the sixth book of his Naturales quaestiones, entitled De Terrae Motu (Concerning Earthquakes).

== Geological setting ==
The epicentre of the earthquake lies within a zone of active extensional faulting, but close to the southern flank of Vesuvius. Analysis of focal mechanisms from the area around Vesuvius indicates that active faulting in the area involves NW–SE and NE–SW trending oblique-slip normal faults and E–W trending normal faults, part of the zone of active extension that extends the full length of the Apennines mountain chain, associated with continued opening of the Tyrrhenian Sea. An association between earthquakes in the central Apennines and eruptions of Vesuvius has been proposed, but is not yet proven. The earthquake is likely to have been a precursor to the renewed activity of Vesuvius in AD 79, following a long dormant period.

== Date ==
There is some uncertainty regarding the year of this earthquake. Seneca, who was writing soon after the event, describes the earthquake as occurring during the consulship of Gaius Memmius Regulus and Lucius Verginius Rufus, which would suggest the year was AD 63. Tacitus, who was writing some forty years later, describes it as occurring during the consulship of Publius Marius and Lucius Afinius Gallus, which indicates AD 62. The page for this event in the online Catalogue of Strong Earthquakes in Italy (BC 461 – 1977) discusses this discrepancy and considers that AD 62 is the more likely date, based on other statements regarding dates in Seneca's Naturales quaestiones.

== Characteristics ==
The extent of damage has been used to estimate the magnitude of the earthquake. Estimates lie in the range from about 5 to 6.1. The maximum felt intensity is estimated to have been in the range IX to X, and the area of highest intensity was elongated roughly WNW–ESE. Shaking was reported to have continued for several days, presumably referring to a sequence of aftershocks. The focal depth is estimated to have been in the range 5–6 km.

== Damage ==
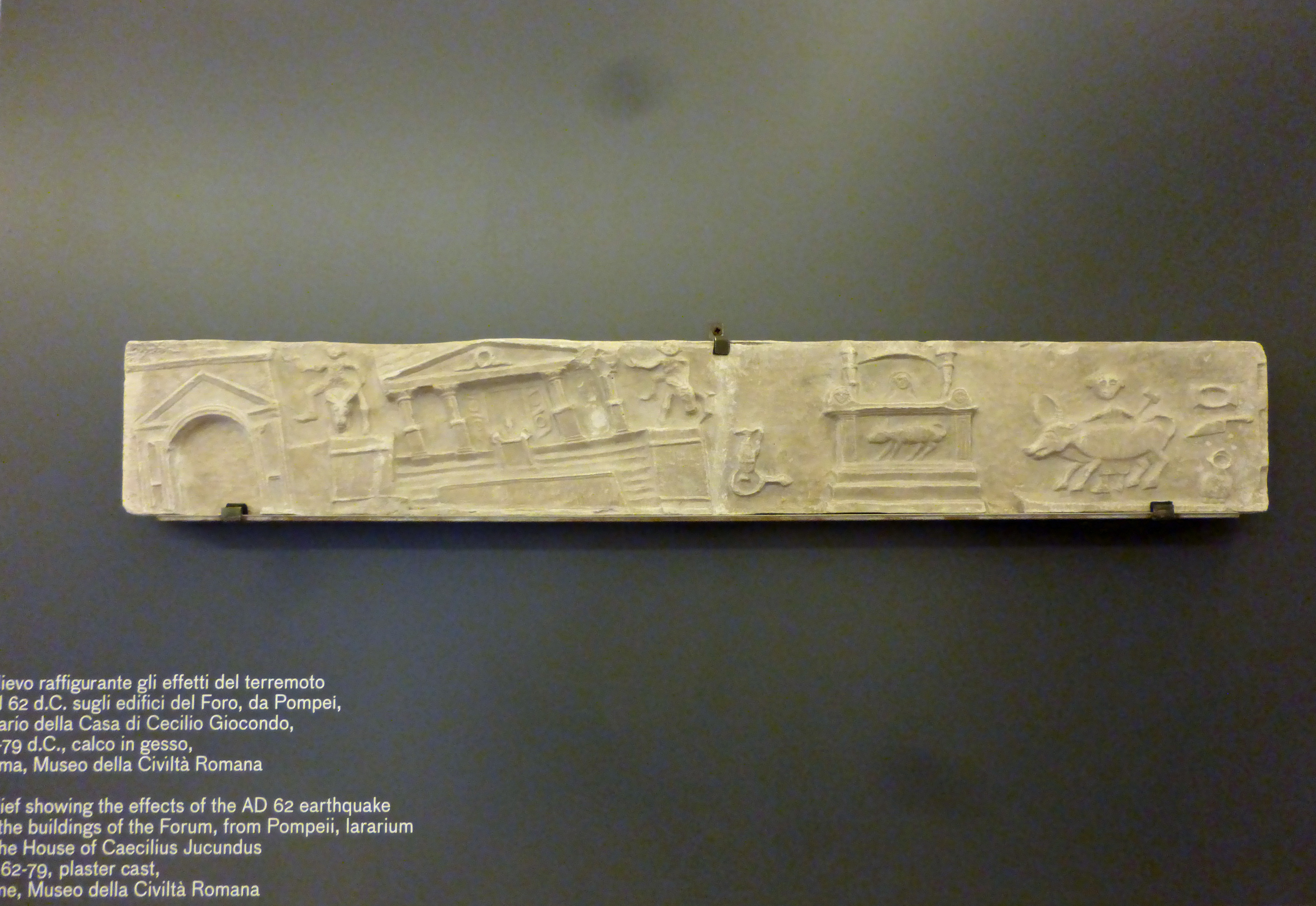
Bas-relief showing the damage to Pompeii's Temple of Jupiter during the earthquake, from the lararium of the House of Lucius Caecilius Iucundus.

The towns of Pompeii and Herculaneum both suffered major damage, with damage to some buildings also reported from Naples and Nuceria. Seneca reported the death of a flock of 600 sheep that he attributed to the effects of poisonous gases.

The House of Lucius Caecilius Iucundus in Pompeii, later destroyed by the eruption of Vesuvius in AD 79, contained bas-reliefs showing damage to the city and its Temple of Jupiter during the earthquake of 62. The house's owner, Lucius Caecilius Iucundus, may have died during the earthquake.

== Aftermath ==
The damage caused by the mainshock and the subsequent series of tremors was at least partly repaired in both Pompeii and Herculaneum by the time of the AD 79 eruption. A pair of bas-reliefs, probably from the lararium in the house of Lucius Caecilius Iucundus in Pompeii, are interpreted as depicting the effects of the earthquake on structures including the Temple of Jupiter, the Aquarium of Caesar, and the Vesuvius Gate.

The earthquake led Roman philosopher, statesman and dramatist Seneca the Younger to devote the sixth book of his Naturales quaestiones to the subject of earthquakes, describing the event of 5 February and giving the cause of earthquakes as the movement of air.

== See also ==
- List of earthquakes in Italy
- List of historical earthquakes
