= James Moran (writer) =

British screenwriter

- Born: 5 March 1972 (age 54); York, Yorkshire, England
- Occupation: Screenwriter
- Known for: Severance, Cockneys vs Zombies, The Fires of Pompeii

James Moran (born 5 March 1972) is a British screenwriter for television and film, who wrote the horror-comedy Severance. He works in the horror, comedy, science-fiction, historical fiction and spy thriller genres.

== Early career ==
Born in York, Moran's first produced work came as the result of a competition run by the Sci Fi Channel. The competition asked for writers to submit short science-fiction themed film scripts. Moran won, and his entry Cheap Rate Gravity was produced and shown both on the sci-fi channel and in front of full-length movies, including Final Destination 2.

Moran secured an agent at the PFD Literary Agency from the strength of the competition win, a spec film script, and a six-part TV drama entitled The School. He wrote the entire run of The School on spec, later saying he was unaware that generally only a pilot is written until a production company shows interest. Moran claims the series is still his favourite of his own works.

== Film work ==
Moran scripted the 2005 film Severance, which concerns office workers on a team building trip being stalked by a masked killer. Talking about where the idea for Severance came from, Moran said "I'd been trying to think of a good horror idea, and one day had a really bad commute home – yuppies in pinstripe suits were everywhere, pushing past me, jumping the queue, and generally being the ignorant scumbags that they are. So, in a flash of temper, I decided to kill off some yuppies in a horror – take them to a cabin, and pick them off one by one. Once I'd calmed down, I thought that was a pretty good idea – take some standard, British office types, and throw them into a cabin-in-the-woods horror, see how they react. And it developed from there."

In April 2009, the BBC reported that the murder of a 17-year-old student from Norfolk was a re-enactment of a scene written by Moran from the film Severance.

Moran had two features released in 2012: a horror-comedy called Cockneys vs Zombies, which was shot in March and April 2011 and promised to be "every bit as ridiculous as its title suggests", and a thriller called Tower Block, which was shot in July and August 2011. Tower Block was the closing film at 2012's FrightFest film festival.

Moran also did an uncredited rewrite on 2014 horror movie The Borderlands, later released in the US as Final Prayer.

In 2013 he wrote and directed a short film, Crazy For You, a romantic comedy about a serial killer, which starred Arthur Darvill and Hannah Tointon. It premiered at London's FrightFest, and has played at the London Short Film Festival, the Seattle International Film Festival, among others. In 2015, Crazy For You won the Best Horror/Sci-Fi award at the Crystal Palace International Film Festival.

In 2014 he wrote and directed another short, Three Minutes, starring Daniel Brocklebank, which was also repurposed into a music video for the band Eighteen Nightmares at the Lux. In 2015, his short film Ghosting premiered at London's FrightFest. In 2016, he co-produced and edited Connie, written and directed by Cat Davies.

In 2017, Moran's new short film Blood Shed began touring film festivals. The film stars Shaun Dooley and Sally Phillips, and was co-written and produced by Cat Davies. The film won various awards since its release at Horror Channel FrightFest, including the Audience Award at Wimbledon International Short Film Festival, Funniest Film, Best Director and Best Script at the Knoxville Horror Film Festival, and Best Male Lead for Shaun Dooley at Sick Chick Flicks Film Festival.

In 2020, it was announced Moran had written Sequel, a female-led slasher produced by Joe Dante and to be directed by Danielle Harris.

== Television work ==
Moran's television writing debut was writing episodes for Doctor Who, and its adult themed spin-off, Torchwood. He lobbied his agent for many years to get him a job on either show. First came Torchwood with the episode, "Sleeper", in the second series. It concerns a burglary that goes wrong, revealing a plot that leaves the whole planet in danger. There are many allusions to terrorism during the episode, and filming on several controlled explosions in Cardiff was almost disrupted by a real terrorist attack in Glasgow. "Sleeper" was broadcast by BBC Two on 23 January 2008. Moran also co-wrote the Torchwood episode, "Day Three" of "Children of Earth" with Russell T Davies which was first broadcast on 8 July 2009.

Moran's Doctor Who episode, "The Fires of Pompeii" – set during the eruption of Mount Vesuvius – was broadcast on 12 April 2008 as part of the revived program's fourth series. Moran also wrote episodes for series 3 of the ITV series Primeval, series 3 of Crossing Lines, the BBC One series Spooks, its BBC Three spin-off Spooks: Code 9, and the NBC series Crusoe, based on the novel by Daniel Defoe.

He would also diversify into children's television, working on series 3 of CBBC show The Sparticle Mystery, series 2 and series 3 of Eve, The Rubbish World of Dave Spud and Silverpoint.

== Other projects ==
In 2008, Moran wrote a comic which featured on the Doctor Who website. His first published short story, Breadcrumbs, appeared in the Doctor Who anthology Short Trips: Transmissions. His other stories were Companion in the anthology Short Trips: Christmas Around the World, Grand Theft Planet in The Doctor Who Storybook 2009, The Haldenmor Fugue in The Doctor Who Storybook 2010, Virus in Torchwood: Consequences, Stakes On A Plane in Torchwood Magazine, October 2009, and Unplugged in Torchwood Magazine, December 2010. Moran's novelisation of The Fires of Pompeii was released on 14 July 2022 as part of the Target Collection.

His first audio work was a Highlander play, The Promise, the fourth and final story in the second season of the Big Finish audios.

He has written, and made his directorial debut with, the crime thriller web series Girl Number 9, starring Tracy-Ann Oberman, Joe Absolom and Gareth David-Lloyd.

In September 2016, Moran's new webseries Mina Murray's Journal, a modern vlog adaptation of Bram Stoker's novel Dracula, launched on YouTube.

== Personal life ==
Moran is an atheist. He married his wife, Cat Davies, a writer-director, in 2017. In 2016 they formed Moranic Productions, a production company with a slate of shorts, features, and webseries. He also lectures on screenwriting at Met Film School, NFTS and the London Film Academy.

Moran used to have a personal blog called The Pen Is Mightier Than The Spork. Moran started writing it around the same time as he started writing the screenplay for Severance, documenting the entire process all the way to the DVD release, and up until July 2009 he still regularly updated about his current projects. He also endeavoured to answer any reader's questions and offer advice to other would-be screenwriters. He continued blogging from April 2010, with comments switched off, but ended the blog in 2018. He left Twitter in 2023, moving to other social sites like Threads and Bluesky.

Not Guilty Pleasures, his podcast celebrating popular culture with a different guest every episode, launched in 2016.
