= Catherine Virlouvet =

French historian & academic

Catherine Virlouvet (born 13 February 1956) is a French historian, a professor of economic and social history of ancient Rome. In 2011, she was appointed director of the École française de Rome, the first woman ever to hold that post.

== Career ==
A former student of the École normale supérieure de Fontenay-aux-Roses (1976), and agrégée d'histoire, she supported a thesis on Roman history entitled Tessera frumentaria: les procédures de distribution du blé public à Rome de la fin de la République au Haut-Empire (Tessera frumentaria: the procedures for distributing public wheat in Rome from the end of the Republic to the Early Empire) in 1986. A member of the École française de Rome (1983–1986), she was maître de conférences of ancient history at the university of Rouen then director of studies of the ancient section of antiquities of the École française de Rome (1993–1999). She was appointed a professor of ancient history at the Aix-Marseille University in 1999, and heads the École française de Rome since September 2011. A student of Claude Nicolet, she specialized in economic and social history of Rome at the end of the Republic and under the High Empire.

== Publications ==
=== Books ===
- 1995: Tessera frumentaria. Les procédures de la distribution de blé public à Rome, École française de Rome
- 2001: Famines et émeutes à Rome des origines de la république à la mort de Néron, École française de Rome
- 2009: La plèbe frumentaire dans les témoignages épigraphiques : essai d’histoire sociale et administrative du peuple de Rome antique, École française de Rome
- 2004: (Co-direction) Nourrir les cités de la Méditerranée. Antiquité-Temps modernes, avec B. Marin, Maisonneuve & Larose, Maison méditerranéenne des sciences de l’homme, Paris, 894 p. ISBN 2-7068-1720-8.

=== Articles ===
- 2000: Les denrées alimentaires dans les archives des Sulpicii de Pouzzoles, Cahiers Glotz, XI, (pp. 131–149)
- 2001: La tribu des soldats originaires de Rome, Mélanges de l'École française de Rome 113, 2, (pp. 735–752)

== Recordings ==
- Le peuple de Rome, émission de Vincent Charpentier, "Le salon noir", France Culture, 27.03.2013, 27 min, online.
