= Claude Nicolet =

French historian (1930–2010)

- Born: 15 September 1930; Marseille
- Died: 24 December 2010 (aged 80); Paris
- Occupation: Historian

Claude Nicolet (15 September 1930 – 24 December 2010) was a 20th-21st century French historian, a specialist of the institutions and political ideas of ancient Rome.

== Biography ==
=== Career ===
A former student of the École normale supérieure, agrégé d'histoire and a member of the École française de Rome from 1957 to 1959, he was a professor of ancient history at the University of Tunis, Caen University then de Paris-I Panthéon-Sorbonne, and emeritus director of studies from 1997 at the École pratique des hautes études. Elected a member of the Académie des inscriptions et belles-lettres in 1986, he was director of the École française de Rome from 1992 to 1995.

=== Ministerial advisor ===
He made a short political career as a member of Pierre Mendès France's cabinet in 1956. He was secretary, then editor-in- chief of the Cahiers de la République, and assigned to the office of Jean-Pierre Chevènement, between 1984 and 2002, on civic education.

He showed anxiety throughout his life to articulate his republican commitment and his career as a historian. This contributed to the originality of his work, straddling between ancient Rome and contemporary times, especially around the functioning of society and political institutions. As Catherine Virlouvet pointed out, "it is the same questioning that unites Le métier de citoyen dans la Rome antique (1976) and L'idée républicaine en France.

=== The republican idea in France ===
According to Céline Spector, Nicolet's work L'idée républicaine en France (1982) contributed to the return of the Republican idea in the 1980s. According to him, it was Rousseau who provided the theoretical basis for the notion of a republic as it is understood in France. In particular, it resumed its concept of sovereignty and its theory of law to the citizen of Geneva. Nicolet writes:

The great affair of the Republicans is, of course, Rousseau. The man and his work have been, by themselves, so intimately connected, and they are, moreover, so contradictory in appearance, and so coherent in reality, that we can not be surprised that Rousseau was, century-long - and perhaps more - both the inevitable reference and the most striking sign of division among the French republicans, as well as some others.

== Selected works ==
- 1957: Le radicalisme, Paris, Presses universitaires de France, 5th edition 1983, coll. "Que sais-je?", n° 761
- 1959: Pierre Mendès France ou Le métier de Cassandre, Paris, Éditions Julliard
- 1966: L'ordre équestre à l'époque républicaine, 312-43 av JC, thèse d'État (2 vol.), Paris, coll. BEFAR
- 1967: Les Gracques : crise agraire et révolution à Rome, Paris, Éditions Gallimard
- 1976: Le métier de citoyen dans la Rome républicaine, Paris, Gallimard
- 1976: Tributum, Bonn, Habelt
- 1978: Rome et la conquête du monde méditerranéen 264–27 av JC (2 vol.), Presses universitaires de France, series "Nouvelle Clio", ISBN 2-13-035850-0.
- 1980: Insula sacra : la loi Gabinia-Calpurnia de Délos (58 av JC), École française de Rome
- 1982: L'idée républicaine en France : essai d'histoire critique (1789-1924). 1982. Gallimard, series "Bibliothèque des histoires"; reprint Gallimard, 1994, series "Tel".
- 1988: L'inventaire du monde : géographie et politique aux origines de l'Empire romain, Fayard, ISBN 2-213-02020-5
- 1992 : La République en France. État des lieux, Paris, Le Seuil
- 1998: Rendre à César : économie et société dans la Rome antique, Gallimard, series "Bibliothèque des histoires".
- 1999: Mégapoles méditerranéennes : géographie urbaine rétrospective, actes du colloque de Rome (May 1996), Rome, École française de Rome
- 2000: Histoire, Nation, République, Paris, Éditions Odile Jacob
- 2000: Censeurs et publicains : économie et fiscalité dans la Rome antique, Fayard, ISBN 2213602964.
- 2003: La fabrique d'une nation : la France entre Rome et les Germains, Paris, Éditions Perrin
- 2003: (with Anne-Cécile Robert and André Bellon) Le peuple inattendu, Paris, Syllepse

== Bibliography ==
- Spector, Céline (2011). Au prisme de Rousseau : usages politiques contemporains (in French). Oxford: Voltaire foundation.
