= Temple of Jupiter (Pompeii) =

Temple in Roman Pompeii

Coordinates: 40.7499°N 14.4845°E

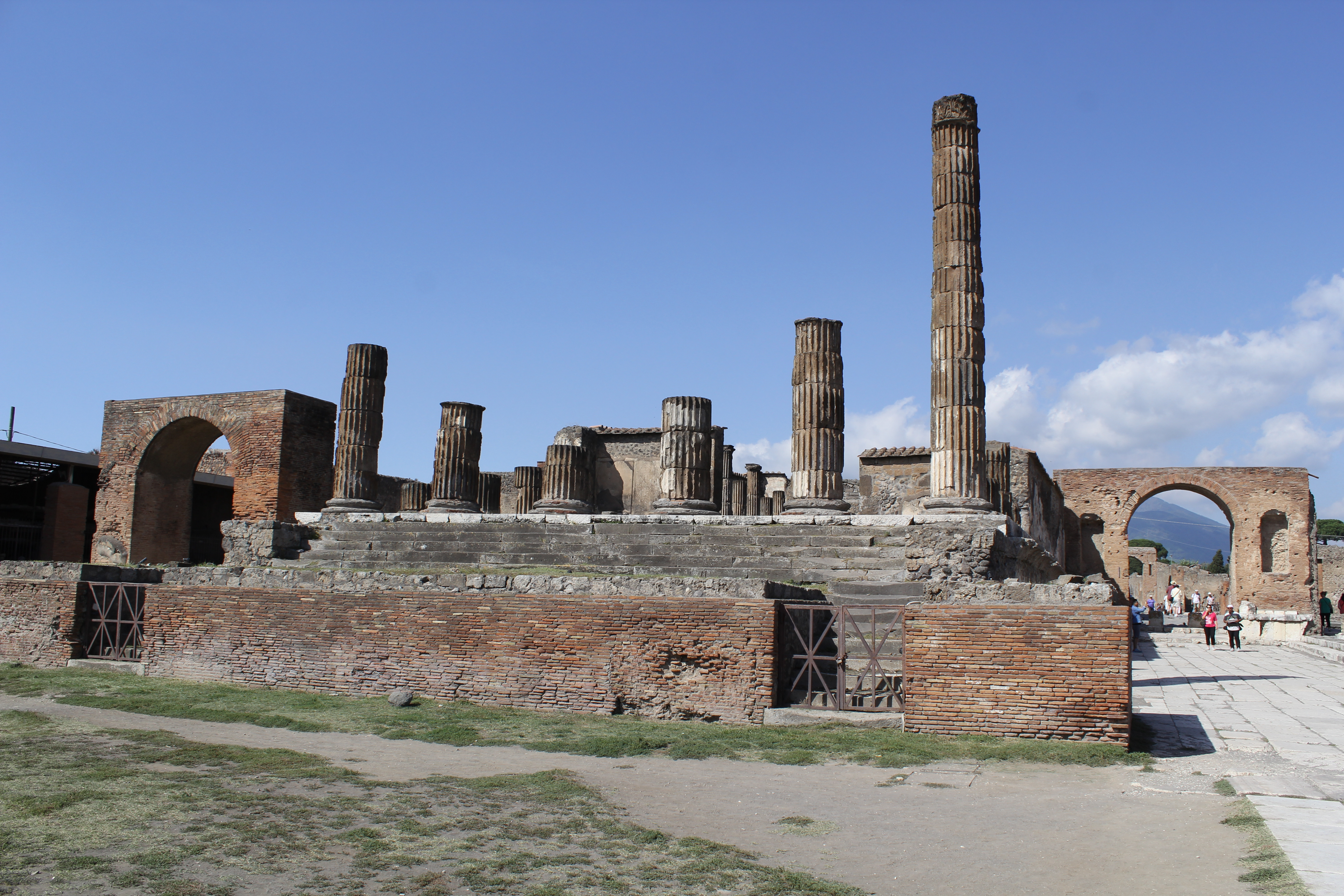
The Temple of Jupiter

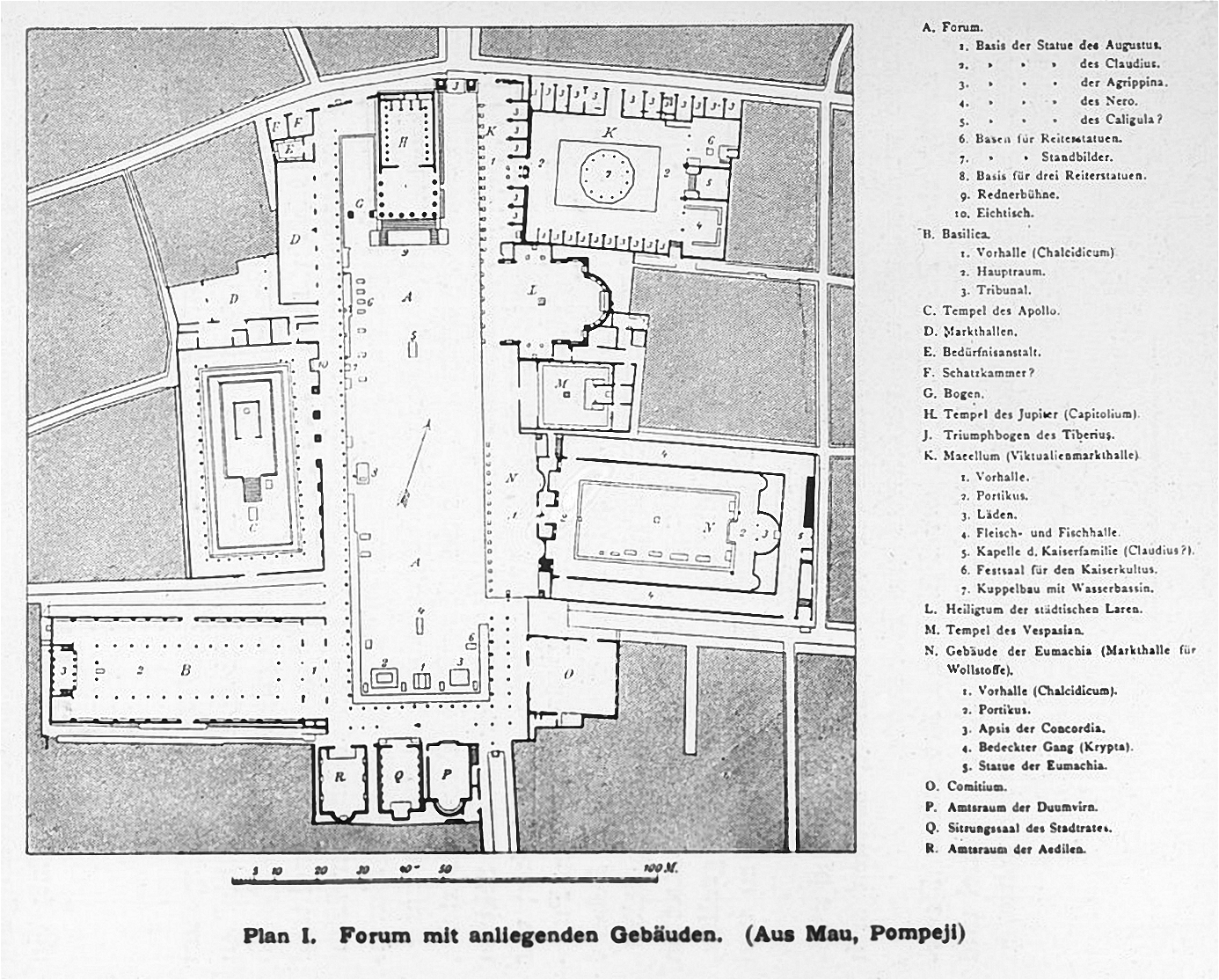
Map of the Forum at Pompeii, with the Temple of Jupiter or Capitolium (H) at its north end (top centre).

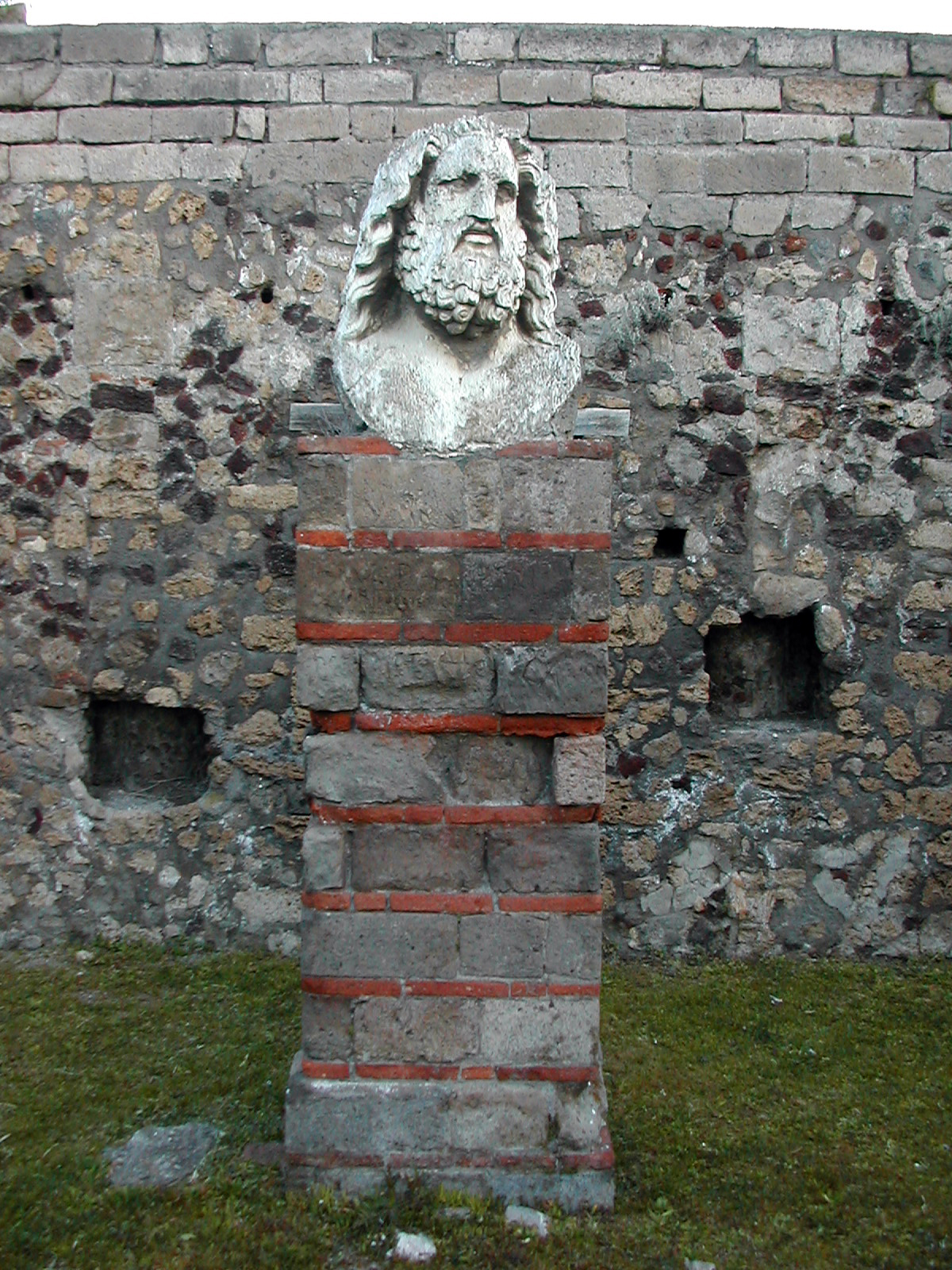
Bust of Jupiter at north end of Temple

The Temple of Jupiter, Capitolium, or Temple of the Capitoline Triad, was a temple in Roman Pompeii, at the north end of its forum. Initially dedicated to Jupiter alone, it was built in the mid-2nd century BC at the same time as the Temple of Apollo was being renovated – this was the area at which Roman influence over Pompeii increased. So Roman Jupiter superseded the Greek Apollo as the town's leading divinity. Jupiter was the ruler of the gods and the protector of Rome, where his temple was the center of Roman religion and of the cult of state.

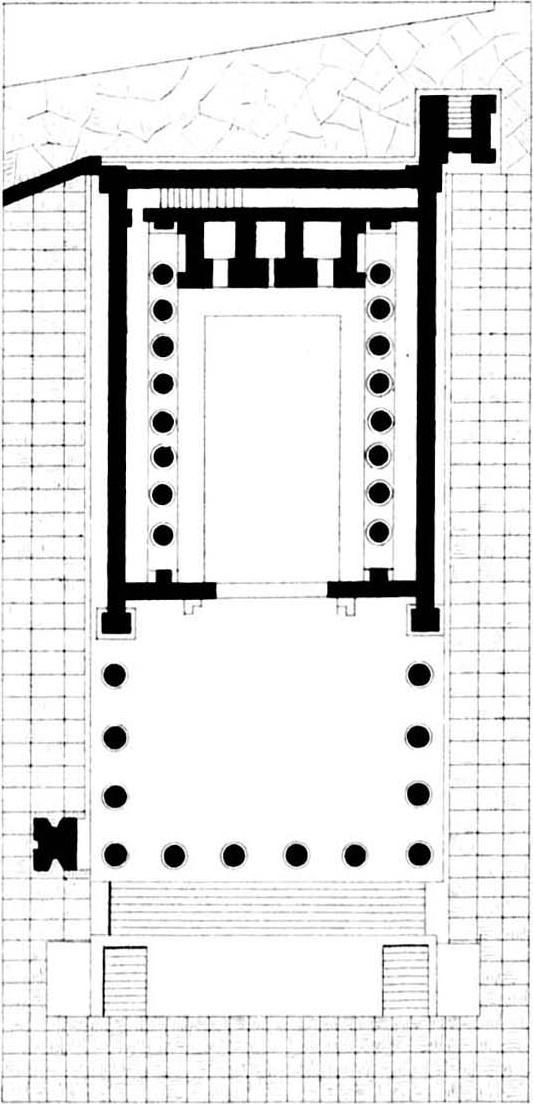
Temple plan

== Expansion following the Roman conquest ==
As the most important divinity in Ancient Rome, many temples were built to honor Jupiter or the entire Capitoline Triad (consisting of Jupiter, Juno, and Minerva) in towns newly conquered by the Romans. This held for Pompeii, where the previously existing Temple of Jupiter was enlarged and altered after the conquest.

Pompeii was occupied by the Romans beginning in 310 BC. However, it maintained much of its autonomy until the Social War at the beginning of the 1st century BC. In 89, the town was besieged by Sulla. Roman language, culture, and law would soon dominate the city.

The architecture of the town had been largely changed by the Greeks, but Roman rule would soon lead to alterations in this style. In contrast to the previous Samnite occupiers, the Romans believed in the importance of architecture in religious and civic life. Pompeii was transformed into a much more public and open place. Public buildings and spaces would come to dominate the city.

== Description ==
The temple structure was built in 150 BC to dominate the forum, and it became Pompeii's main temple after the Roman conquest. Pure Italic style characterized the capitolium style, which sat atop a base measuring 121 x 56 x 10 feet. The interior of the temple contained the cella, which held the statues of Jupiter, Juno, and Minerva, and which only the priests were permitted to enter. There was a chamber below the main hall which was used to store sacrificial offerings and the treasury of the city.

== Destruction in the 62 earthquake and loss of significance ==
In 62 AD, an earthquake shook the city of Pompeii, destroying much of the Temple of Jupiter. After this, the much smaller Temple of Jupiter Meilichios became the main seat of worship to Jupiter and the Capitoline Triad. The original Temple of Jupiter was still awaiting restoration when Mount Vesuvius erupted in 79.
