= The Fires of Pompeii =

190 – "The Fires of Pompeii"
- Doctor Who episode
- An adult Pyrovile bears down on the Doctor and Donna inside Mount Vesuvius.

Cast
- Doctor: David Tennant – Tenth Doctor
- Companion: Catherine Tate – Donna Noble
- Others: Peter Capaldi – Caecilius; Tracey Childs – Metella; Phil Davis – Lucius; Sasha Behar – Spurrina; Francesca Fowler – Evelina; Lorraine Burroughs – Thalina; Victoria Wicks – High Priestess; Francois Pandolfo – Quintus; Karen Gillan – Soothsayer; Phil Cornwell – Stallholder

Production
- Directed by: Colin Teague
- Written by: James Moran
- Produced by: Phil Collinson
- Executive producers: Russell T Davies; Julie Gardner
- Music by: Murray Gold
- Production code: 4.3
- Series: Series 4
- Running time: 50 minutes
- First broadcast: 12 April 2008

Chronology
← Preceded by "Partners in Crime"	Followed by → "Planet of the Ood"

"The Fires of Pompeii" is the second episode of the fourth series of the British science fiction television series Doctor Who. It was broadcast on BBC One on 12 April 2008. Set shortly before and during the eruption of Mount Vesuvius in AD 79, this episode depicts alien time traveller the Doctor (David Tennant) and his new companion Donna Noble (Catherine Tate) on a trip to Pompeii, where they uncover an alien invasion. Their clashing worldviews present an ethical dilemma for the Doctor.

The episode was filmed in Rome's Cinecittà studios, and was the first time the Doctor Who production team took its cast abroad for filming since its revival. The production of the episode was impeded by a fire near the sets several weeks before filming and by problems for the production team crossing into Europe.

Critical reception of the episode was generally mixed. The premise—the moral dilemma the Doctor faces, and Donna's insistence that he save a family from Pompeii—was widely praised, while the writing, particularly of the supporting characters, was criticised.

"The Fires of Pompeii" marks the first appearance on Doctor Who by both Karen Gillan and Peter Capaldi. Both would later take starring roles on the show: Gillan was cast as the Doctor's new companion Amy Pond starting with the next series, and Capaldi appeared as the Twelfth Doctor beginning in 2013.

== Plot ==
=== Synopsis ===
The Tenth Doctor and Donna arrive in Pompeii the day before the eruption of Mount Vesuvius in 79. They later discover a local merchant has sold the TARDIS to sculptor Lobus Caecilius. The Doctor and Donna go to Caecilius' house to retrieve it. Unknown to them, they have been followed by a soothsayer who reports to the Sibylline Sisterhood that the prophesied man in the blue box has arrived, and the Sisters fear the prediction that his arrival brings fire and death. However, the High Priestess assures them that Pompeii will soon enter a new golden age.

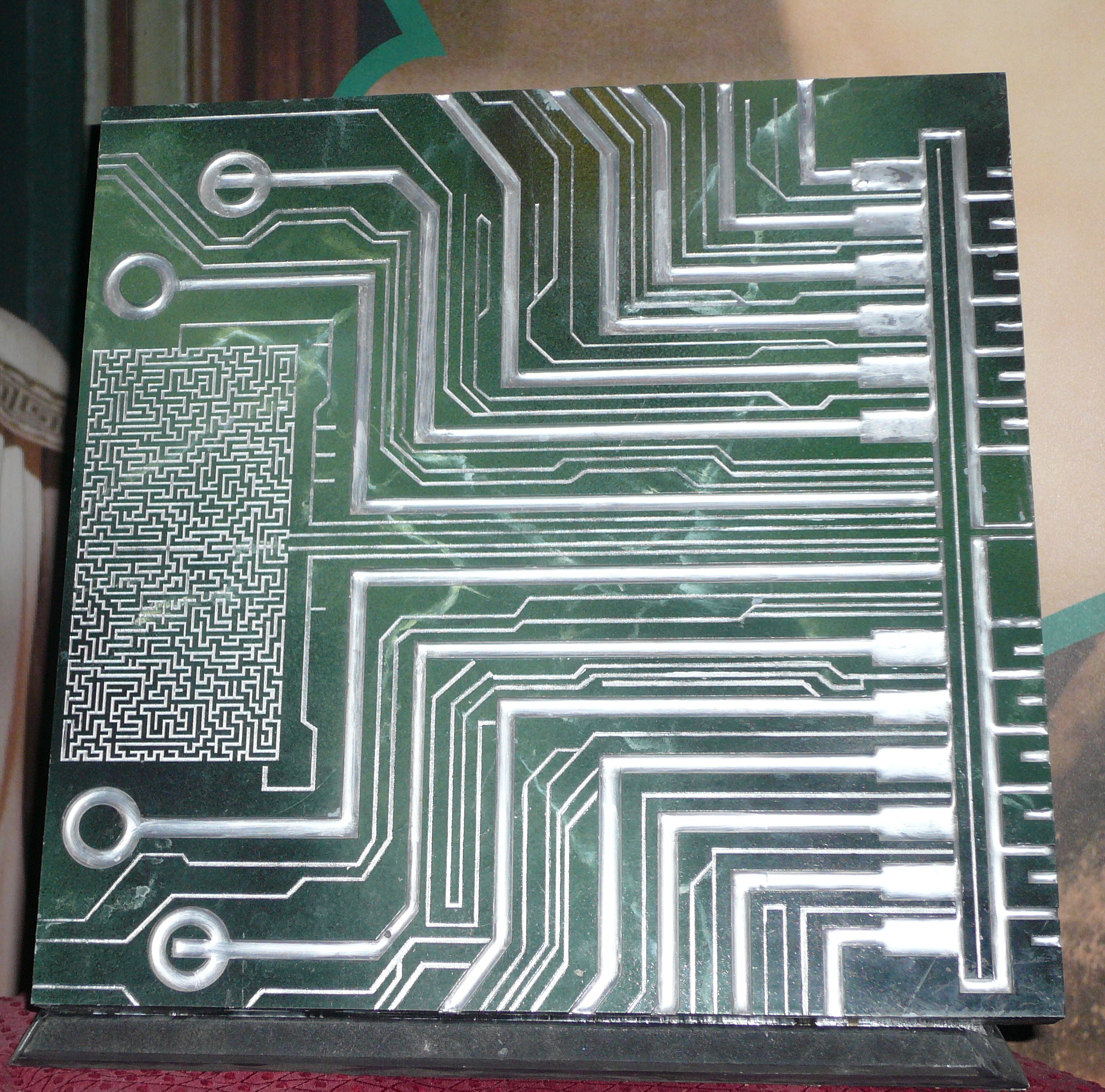
The circuit prop, on display at the Doctor Who Experience

At the house, the Doctor and Donna meet the local augur, Lucius Petrus Dextrus, who has arrived to collect a sculpture he commissioned. The Doctor is intrigued by the sculpture, which resembles a segment of an oversized circuit board. The Doctor wishes to learn more about the sculptures and enlists Caecilius' son Quintus to help him break into Lucius Petrus' house. Inside, the Doctor deduces that the circuits will make an energy converter, but he is caught by Lucius Petrus, who beckons a large stone creature to attack and kill them. The stone creature appears in Caecilius' house and attacks them, but Quintus douses the creature in water and kills it. In the confusion, the Sisterhood kidnap Donna, and the Doctor sets off to rescue her. The Doctor discovers that the Sisterhood are being controlled by the Pyroviles, stony creatures whose home planet of Pyrovilia was lost. The Doctor escapes with Donna into a tunnel that leads into the heart of Mount Vesuvius.

The Doctor discovers that the volcano is being used by the Pyroviles to convert the human race and conquer Earth. The Doctor realises the volcano will not erupt if the energy converter is running, and tells Donna that the volcanic eruption is a fixed point in time and must always happen. The Doctor and Donna get into an escape pod and together press a lever which overloads the converter and triggers the eruption, killing the Pyroviles and launching the pod clear of the blast. The Doctor and Donna run for the TARDIS, leaving Caecilius and his family behind in their home. However, Donna tearfully begs the Doctor to go back and at least save one person from the volcano. The Doctor relents and goes back for Caecilius and his family, leaving them on a hill to watch the destruction. He comments to Donna that she was right – he does need someone to stop him.

=== Continuity ===
The Doctor also uses the phrase "Volcano Day", which he and Captain Jack Harkness both used in the Ninth Doctor episode "The Doctor Dances" (2005). The Doctor claims that "that fire" had nothing to do with him, referring to the First Doctor serial "The Romans" (1965), in which the Doctor accidentally sets fire to a map, leading to the Great Fire of Rome. James Moran "specifically wanted to put it in, just for a fun continuity thing" and "because [the reference] works as a joke even if you don't know what the Doctor's referring to".

=== Outside references ===
The Doctor identifies himself as "Spartacus", to which Donna replies "So am I." This is a reference to a scene in the film Spartacus, where all the slaves shield Spartacus by each shouting "I'm Spartacus!"

The characters of Caecilius, his wife Metella and their son Quintus refer to a family featured in the Cambridge Latin Course textbooks, who in turn were based on a real citizen of Pompeii and his family.

At one point, Donna says "No way!", to which the Doctor responds, "Yes way! Appian Way!", referring to the Appian Way, an early and strategically important Roman road, that connected Rome to Brindisi.

While telling the Doctor that he had sold the TARDIS, a stallholder (performed with a cockney accent) comments that he "got fifteen sesterces for it. Lovely jubbly", referencing the London market trader term popularised as Del Boy's catchphrase in the sitcom Only Fools and Horses.

The Doctor's line, "You must excuse my friend, she's from Barcelona" refers to the frequent apologetic catchphrase of Basil Fawlty from the sitcom Fawlty Towers.

== Production ==
=== Writing ===
How does [the Doctor] decide who lives, who dies, when to intervene, and when not to? If you do save them, where do you stop? Do you remake the universe according to what you think is right and wrong?

— James Moran

Executive producer Russell T Davies originally planned to include a serial set in Pompeii in the first new series of Doctor Who, after seeing the documentary Pompeii: The Last Day. That episode's position was given to "Boom Town" and the idea was shelved for three years.

The episode was written by James Moran, who previously wrote the film Severance and the Torchwood episode "Sleeper"; Moran was requested to write the episode as a consequence of the latter. Moran had difficulty writing the episode, and had to rewrite the Doctor's opening line over twenty times. The Pyrovile were also edited during writing: they were previously called Pyrovillaxians and Pyrovellians.

Moran worked closely with Davies because of the constraints imposed by filming. Davies encouraged Moran to insert linguistic jokes similar to those in the comic book series Asterix, such as Lucius Petrus Dextrus ("Lucius Stone Right Arm"), TK Maxximus, and Spartacus; the use of the phrase "I'm Spartacus!" refers to the 1960 film. Moran drew the name Caecilius from that of the main character in Book I of the Cambridge Latin Course, who is in turn based on the banker Lucius Caecilius Iucundus, and he based the ancillary characters of Metella (Tracey Childs) and Quintus on Caecilius's family in the same course; the character of Evelina was the only member of the family created by Moran. At the end of Book I of the Cambridge Latin Course, Caecilius and Metella perish in Pompeii on the day of the eruption, but Quintus survives. This episode creates an alternate ending to their story, where they are all rescued by the Doctor and move to Rome.

The episode was heavily based on a moral question posed to the Doctor by Donna: whether to warn the population of Pompeii, or to recuse themselves from the situation. Moran also had to deal with the intensity and sensitivity required when writing about the eruption. Davies and Moran both appreciated Catherine Tate's performance, and cited Donna's ability to humanise the Doctor and help him deal with "lose-lose situations" as the reason the Doctor travels with companions.

The series' story arc was hinted at by the Doctor's invocation of the Shadow Proclamation, an intergalactic code previously invoked in "Rose", "The Christmas Invasion", "Fear Her" and "Partners in Crime", and referencing the "Medusa Cascade", which executive producer Russell T Davies stated in Doctor Who Magazine would "come back to haunt us" later in the series. Moran also added continuity links independent of the story arc: as a "fun continuity thing", the script includes a scene in which the Doctor admits partial responsibility for the Great Fire of Rome, as depicted at the end of the 1965 serial The Romans; and the sale of the TARDIS as modern art refers to the 1979 serial City of Death, which includes a scene in which the TARDIS is appraised in a similar fashion. Additionally, Lucius Petrus, while under prophetic influence, informs Donna that "there is something on your back"—a foreshadowing of the story development in the season's later episode "Turn Left".

=== Filming ===
The episode was filmed at the Cinecittà studios in Rome in September 2007. The filming reused some of the sets from the show Rome. Other locations suggested were in Malta and Wales, but the size of the project, the biggest since the show's revival, resulted in production taking place in Italy. This was the first time the larger part of an episode was filmed abroad and the first time the cast had filmed abroad since 1996; the television movie was filmed in Vancouver and pick-up shots had previously been made in New York City for "Daleks in Manhattan". Cinecittà had accepted the BBC's request in order to promote the studios, despite the show's small budget.

Filming an episode abroad had been suggested in 2004, but the episode was the first such occasion. Planning began in April 2007, before Moran had written the script, and continued until the production team travelled to Italy. Several weeks before filming started, a fire disrupted the production. Moving to Rome caused problems for the production team: the equipment truck was delayed for several hours at the Swiss border; the special effects team were delayed for twenty-four hours at Customs in Calais. The production team only had 48 hours to film on location. The aftermath of the eruption was filmed on the same night as the location shots. To create the falling ash, the special effects team used a large mass of cork, with a "constant supply of debris raining down". Scenes set at the Temple of Sibyl were filmed at the Temple of Peace, Cardiff on 18 and 19 September 2007.

=== Cast notes ===
Two of the cast members of "The Fires of Pompeii" were later cast in starring roles for Doctor Who. Karen Gillan returned in the fifth series to play Amy Pond, full-time companion of Matt Smith's Eleventh Doctor. Casting director Andy Pryor suggested her to new executive producer Steven Moffat based on her performance in this episode as one of the soothsayers.

Peter Capaldi was cast as the Twelfth Doctor in 2013, and made his first appearance in the 2013 Christmas special "The Time of the Doctor" (with an uncredited cameo appearance in the anniversary special "The Day of the Doctor"). Capaldi's Doctor addresses this in the episode "The Girl Who Died," when the Doctor finally remembers that he shares a face with a man he was persuaded to save in Pompeii, despite his initial reluctance to alter that timeline. He surmises that he subconsciously chose this face for his current regeneration as a reminder that his job is to save lives. Capaldi also played John Frobisher throughout Children of Earth, the third series in the Doctor Who spin-off Torchwood, although no similar connection has been made on-screen to this character.

Tracey Childs and Phil Davis have also performed on Doctor Who audio productions for Big Finish.

== Broadcast ==
Tate perfectly portrayed Donna's anguish as she forlornly appealed for people not to run to the beaches and certain death. For me, that short scene was the emotional highpoint of a series of heart-rending scenes, each with Donna at their heart.

— Scott Matthewman, The Stage

Overnight figures estimated the episode was watched by 8.1 million viewers, with a peak of 8.5 million viewers. The consolidated figure was 9.04 million. The episode was the second most watched programme on 12 April; Britain's Got Talent was viewed by 9.44 million people. The episode was the tenth most-watched programme of the week and received an Appreciation Index score of 87 (considered Excellent).

=== Critical reception ===
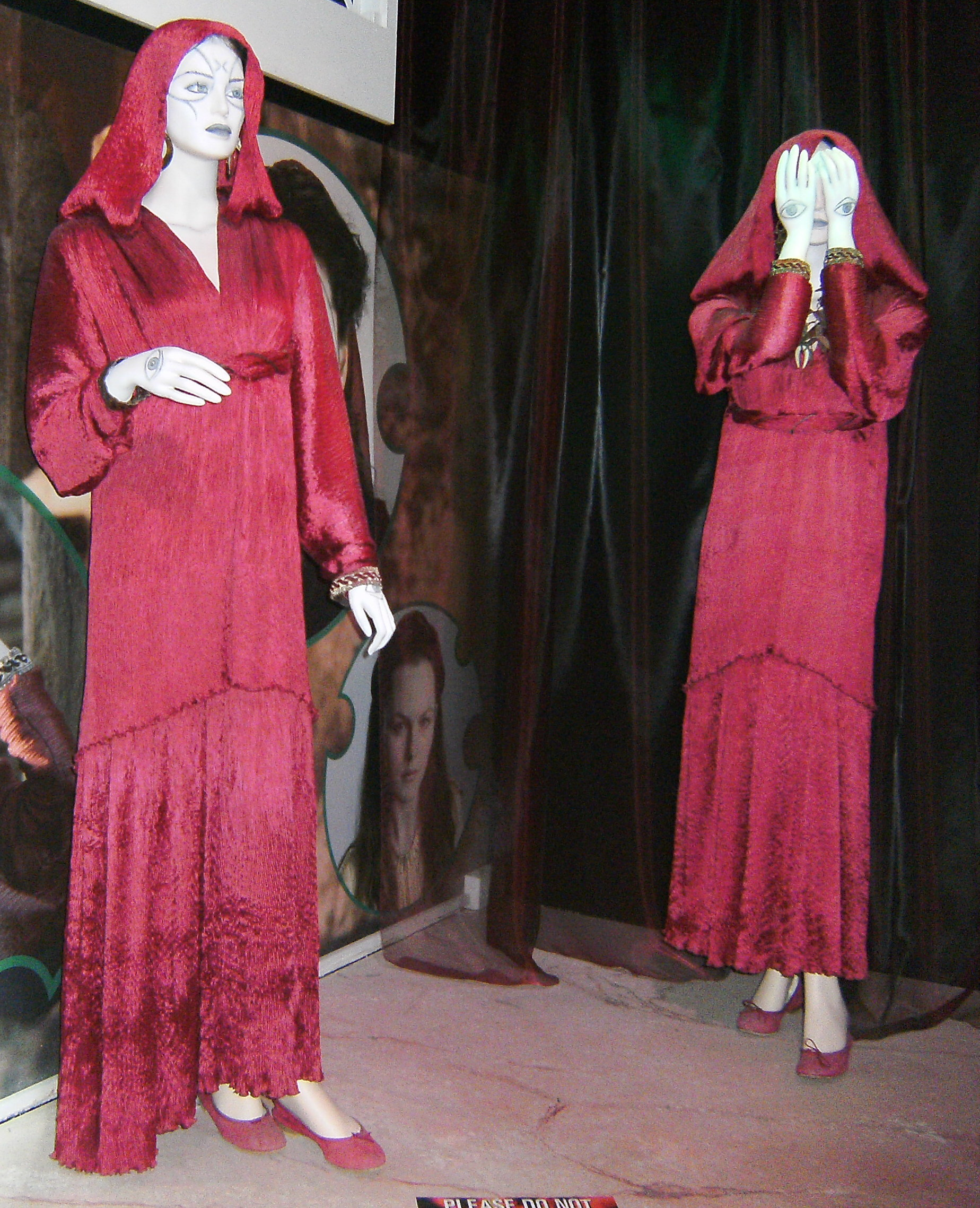
The Sibylline Sisterhood costumes as shown at the Doctor Who Experience

The episode received generally mixed reviews. Ian Hyland, writing for News of the World, said that Tate "was almost bearable this week". He also complimented the "TK Maxximus" joke. He was ambivalent to Donna's reaction to the Doctor leaving Caecilius's family to die: he criticised her acting, comparing her to The Catherine Tate Show character Joanie "Nan" Taylor, but said "top again if that was intentional". He closed saying "this week was a hundred times better than that lame opening episode. Scarier aliens, stronger guest stars and a proper adult-friendly storyline involving sisterhoods and soothsayers."

Scott Matthewman of The Stage said that Donna's insistence to change the past "formed the emotional backbone of this episode, producing some truly heartbreaking performances". He liked the joke about the TARDIS's translating the Doctor's and Donna's Latin phrases to Celtic, saying it was "subtly played throughout the episode [...] in a way that builds the joke without trampling it into the ground". His favourite part was Donna's attempts to divert the population of Pompeii away from the beach; the scene was "the emotional highpoint of a series of heart rending scenes". However, he criticised Moran's writing, specifically, Quintus's and Metella's dialogue, saying the former "remained pretty much one-dimensional throughout". Alan Stanley Blair of SyFy Portal also gave a positive review. He was highly appreciative of Tate, saying "[she] moved even further away from her "Runaway" character that initially joined the show." The phrase "TK Maxximus" and the Doctor's use of a water pistol to subdue the Pyrovile were complimented, as were the special effects used to animate the Pyrovile. However, he disapproved of the use of Cockney colloquialisms in the episode, most notably the Stallholder (Phil Cornwell) saying "lovely jubbly".

Ben Rawson-Jones of Digital Spy gave the episode three stars out of five. His opening said "Fantastic effects and a well developed moral dilemma bolster 'The Fires of Pompeii', although the episode fails to erupt." Rawson-Jones felt that Moran's script took "too long to actively engage the viewer and tap into the compelling premise of the time travellers arriving in the doomed city shortly before 'volcano day'." and that "the subplots are unsatisfyingly muddled for the majority of the narrative." He also complained about the characterisation of the supporting cast, saying that "Peter Capaldi and Phil Davis [deserved] better". However, he said the moral dilemma the Doctor faced was "compelling" and the Doctor's use of the water pistol "adds a pleasing sense of fun to counterbalance the impending stench of death and harks nicely back to the Tom Baker era of the show." Overall, he appreciated the premise of the episode, but thought the episode "deserved better writing".

=== In print ===
The Fires of Pompeii
- Author: James Moran
- Series: Doctor Who book: Target novelisations
- Publisher: BBC Books
- Publication date: 14 July 2022
- ISBN: 978-1785947797

A novelisation of this story written by James Moran was released in paperback on 14 July, 2022 as part of the Target Collection.
