= Véronique Chankowski =

French historian

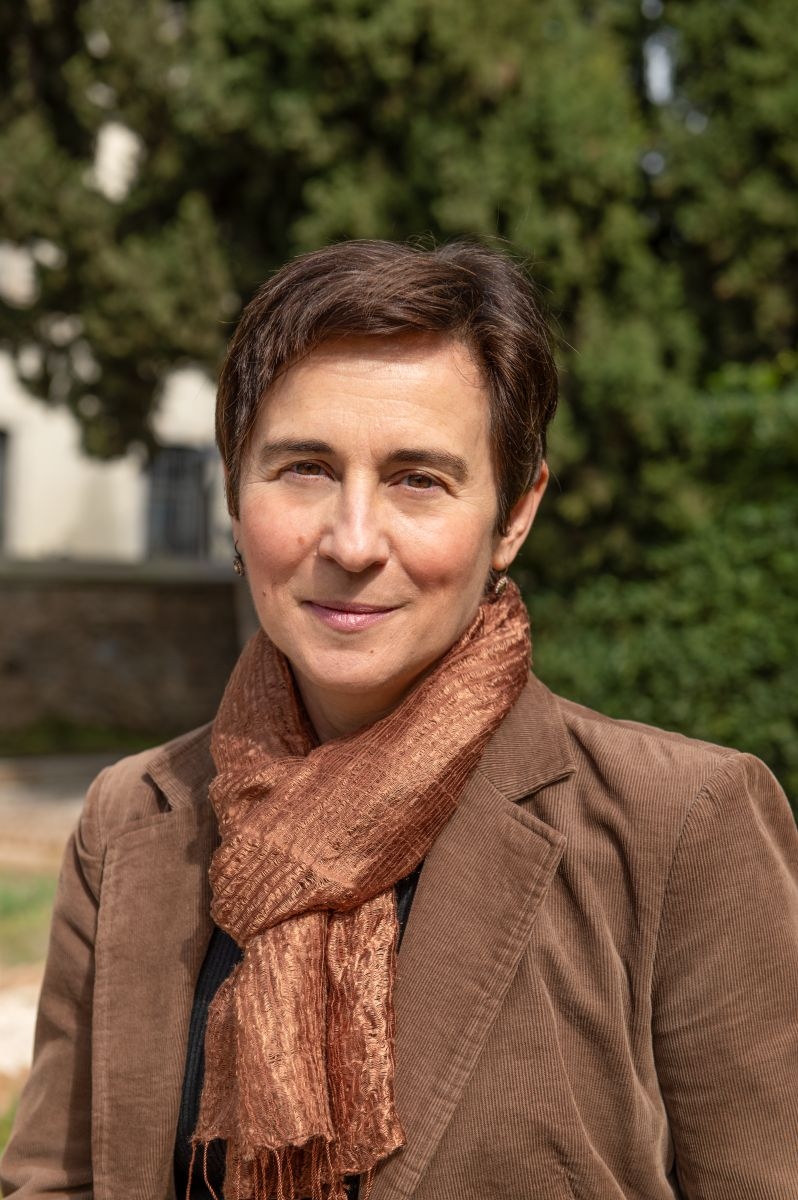
- Born: 26 July 1971
- Alma mater: École normale supérieure de lettres et sciences humaines
- Occupation: University teacher; hellenist
- Academic career
- Fields: History, social history, economic history

Véronique Chankowski (née Sablé; born in 1971) is a French historian. She is a specialist in the economic and social history of the ancient Greek world. She has served as the Director of the French School at Athens since 2019.

== Biography ==
A graduate of the École normale supérieure de Fontenay-Saint-Cloud, Chankowski studied classical literature at the Paris-Sorbonne University. She was recruited as a scientific member of the French School at Athens (1996–2000), where she led several archaeological missions, in Delos (Greece, Cyclades) and in Bulgaria (site of Pistiros where she directed the Franco-Bulgarian archaeological mission from 1997 to 2003). In 2000, she was elected lecturer in Greek history at the Charles de Gaulle University – Lille III. She was named a junior member of the Institut Universitaire de France in 2005.

From 2006 to 2009, Chankowski was director of studies at the French School at Athens. In 2012, she was elected professor of Aegean history and ancient economy at the Lumière University Lyon 2 and teaches Greek history at the bachelor, master and doctoral levels. She directs several theses in history and archaeology of the Greek world. From 2013 to 2018, she was also director of the HiSoMA laboratory (UMR 5189, Histoire et sources des mondes antiques) at the Maison de l'Orient et de la Méditerranée. In 2012, she was a member of the Steering Committee of the Assises de l'Enseignement supérieur et de la recherche. She was appointed Director of the French School at Athens as of September 1, 2019; she is the first woman to hold this position.

== Awards and honours ==
- 2009, Georges Perrot prize from the Académie des Inscriptions et Belles Lettres for her book Athènes et Délos classique (2008).
- 2012, appointed foreign correspondent member of the Kommission für Alte Geschichte und Epigraphik (Deutsches Archäologisches Institut).
- 2019, Knight, Legion of Honour.

== Selected works ==
- V. Chankowski, Cl. Lenoble, J. Maucourant, dir., Les infortunes du juste prix. Marchés, justice sociale et bien commun de l'Antiquité à nos jours, Lormont, Éditions Le Bord de l'Eau (2020).
- Parasites du dieu. Comptables, financiers et commerçants dans la Délos hellénistique, Athènes, BEFAR 384 (2019).
- V. Chankowski, X. Lafon, C. Virlouvet, dir., Entrepôts et circuits de distribution en Méditerranée antique, Athènes, BCH Supplément 58 (2018).
- V. Chankowski & P. Karvonis, dir., Tout vendre, tout acheter. Structures et équipements des marchés antiques, Athènes-Bordeaux, Ausonius (2012).
- Athènes et Délos à l'époque classique. Recherches sur l'administration du sanctuaire d'Apollon délien, Athènes, BEFAR 331 (thèse, 2008).
- K. Verboven, K. Vandorpe, V. Chankowski, dir., Bankers, Loans and Archives in the Ancient World, Studia Hellenistica 44, Louvain, Peeters (2008).
- J. Andreau et V. Chankowski, dir., Vocabulaire et expression de l'économie dans le monde antique, Bordeaux, Ausonius (2008).
- V. Chankowski et F. Duyrat, dir., Le roi et l'économie. Autonomies locales et structures royales dans l'économie de l'empire séleucide, Topoi Supplément 6, Lyon (2004).
