= École française de Rome =

Italian-based French research institute

Coordinates: 41.8949°N 12.4709°E

- Type: Research institute
- Established: 1873
- Director: Brigitte Marin
- Location: Piazza Farnese 67, Rome, ITA
- Website: efrome.it

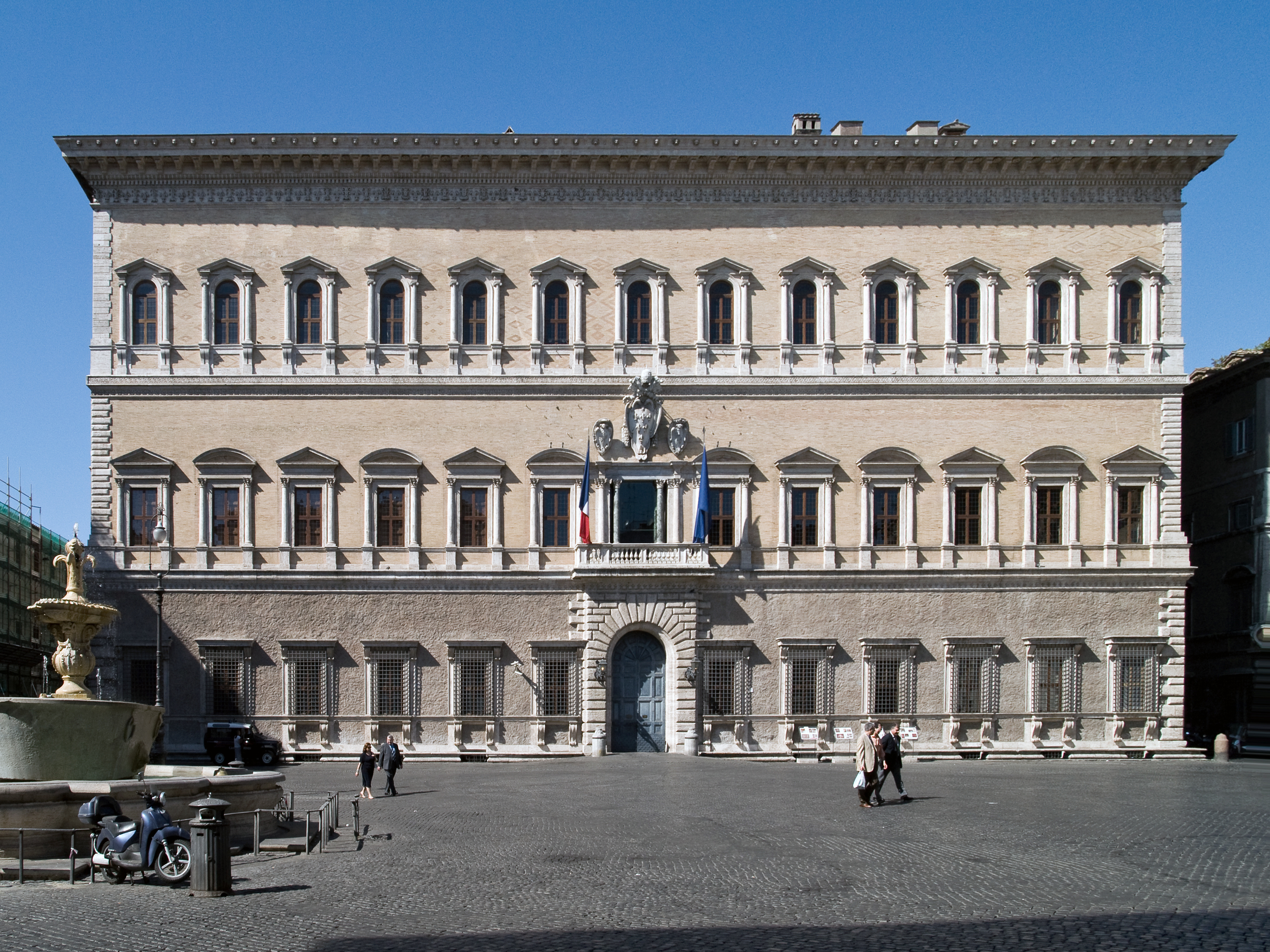
The Palazzo Farnese, home of the École

The École française de Rome (EFR) is a French research institute for history, archaeology, and the social sciences; overseen by the Académie des Inscriptions et Belles-Lettres, and a division of the Ministère de l'Enseignement supérieur et de la Recherche.

== History and description ==
The EFR is the successor to the Institut de Correspondance Archéologique, created in 1829 to accommodate researchers from outside Rome. Composed largely of French and German scholars, it was permanently closed as a result of the Franco-Prussian War. In 1873, a branch of the École française d'Athènes was opened there; becoming the EFR in 1875.

The following year, it found a home on the second floor of the Palazzo Farnese, together with the French Embassy. It has eighteen students, who are there for three years, recruited from doctors and advanced doctoral candidates. It also awards 150 grants each year, to young researchers whose work requires them to be in Italy for one or two months.

The EFR is managed by a Director and is divided into three sections (Antiquity, Middles Ages, Modern Period), each with its own vice-director. It has an extensive library, open to members, former members, and accredited researchers.

It operates its own publishing house, the Publications de l'École française de Rome, which offers several periodical journals, as well as collections of the work done by former members, many of which are available at the Persée digital library.

The EFR also organizes archaeological excavation sites throughout Italy, North Africa and the Balkans.

== The library ==
Since its foundation, the École has developed a documentary collection to support the research activity of its scholars. Today the collections of the library of the École française de Rome are accessible, largely on open shelves, to all scholars and researchers who make a justified request. With almost 215,000 printed documents, these constitute the largest French library outside the territory of France and cover all areas of archaeology, history and social sciences relating to Rome, Italy and the central Mediterranean, from Prehistory to the present day.

Bibliothèque de l'École française de Rome
- Location: Piazza Farnese 67, Rome, France
- Established: 1875
- Architects: Antonio da Sangallo the Younger, Michelangelo, Giacomo Barozzi da Vignola, Giacomo della Porta

Collection
- Specialisation: Archaeology, History, Social sciences

Other information
- Director: Cécile Martini
- Affiliation: École française de Rome
- Website: https://www.efrome.it/en/library

== Sources ==
- Michel Gras & Olivier Poncet (Eds.), Construire l'institution. L'Ecole Française de Rome 1873-1895, EFR, 2013 (Online)
- Jean Bayet (Ed.), L’Histoire et l’œuvre de l’École française de Rome, Paris, E. de Boccard, 1931
