= Pompeii =

Ancient city near modern Naples, Italy

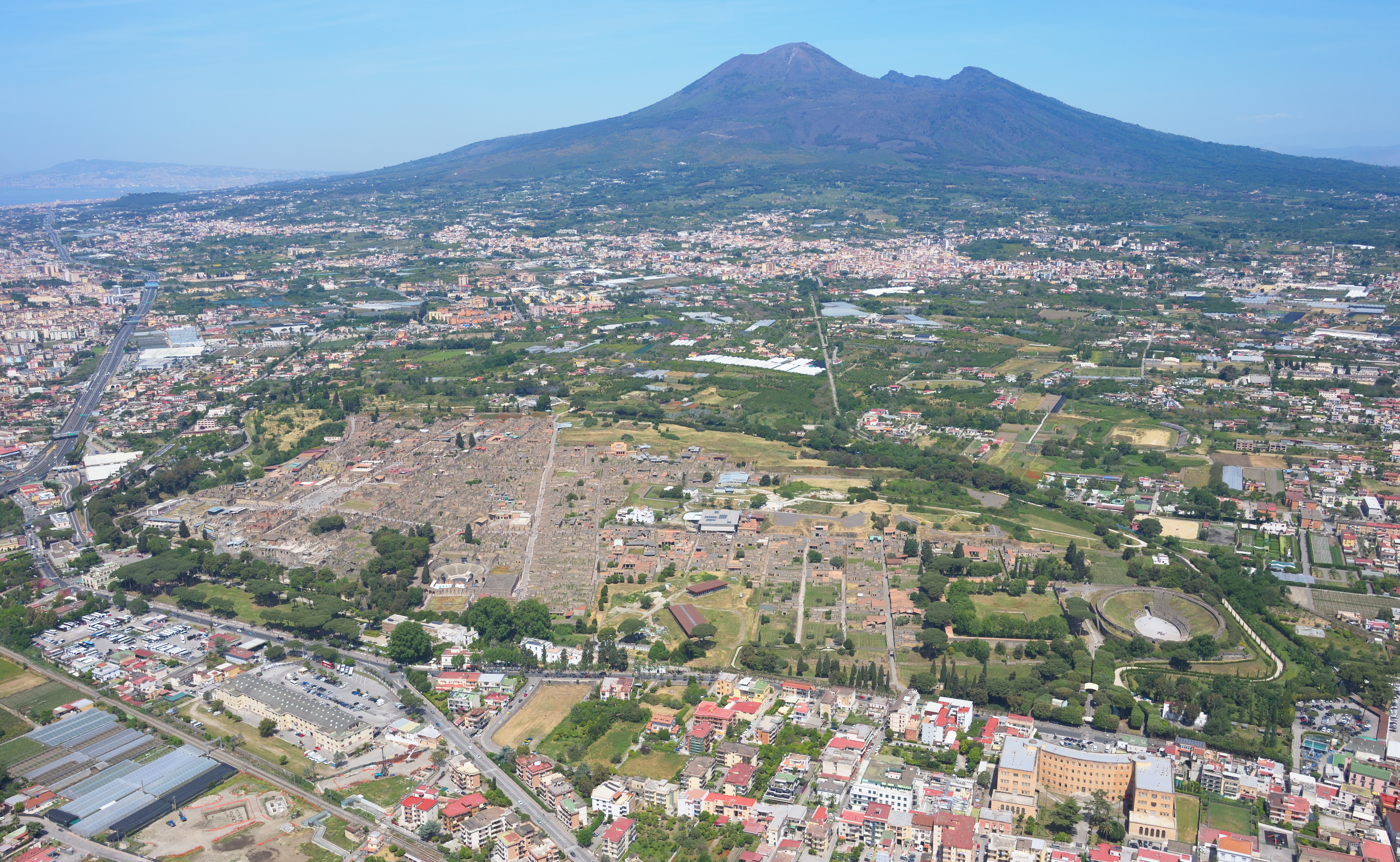
- View of Pompeii and Mount Vesuvius

- Location within Italy
- 40°45′0″N 14°29′10″E
- Type: Settlement
- Location: Pompei, Metropolitan City of Naples, Campania, Italy

History
- Built: 7th–6th century BC
- Abandoned: AD 79

Site notes
- Area: 64 to 67 ha (170 acres)
- Website: www.pompeiisites.org

UNESCO World Heritage Site
- Official name: Archaeological Areas of Pompeii, Herculaneum, and Torre Annunziata
- Type: Cultural
- Criteria: iii, iv, v
- Designated: 1997 (21st session)
- Reference no.: 829
- Region: Europe

Pompeii (/pɒmˈpeɪ(i)/; Latin: [pɔmˈpei̯.iː]) was a city in what is now the municipality of Pompei, near Naples, in the Campania region of Italy. Along with Herculaneum, Stabiae, and many surrounding villas, it was buried under 4 to 6 m (13 to 20 ft) of volcanic ash and pumice in the eruption of Mount Vesuvius in 79 AD.

Largely preserved under the ash, Pompeii offers a snapshot of Roman life, frozen at the moment it was buried, as well as insight into ancient urban planning. It was a wealthy town of 10,000 to 20,000 residents at the time it was destroyed. It hosted many fine public buildings and luxurious private houses with lavish decorations, furnishings and artworks, which were the main attractions for early excavators; subsequent excavations have found hundreds of private homes and businesses reflecting various architectural styles and social classes, as well as numerous public buildings. Organic remains, including wooden objects and human bodies, were interred in the ash; their decay allowed archaeologists to create moulds of figures in their final moments of life. The numerous graffiti carved on outside walls and inside rooms provide a wealth of examples of the largely lost Vulgar Latin spoken colloquially at the time, contrasting with the formal language of classical writers.

Pompeii remained largely undisturbed until its rediscovery in the late 16th century. Major excavations did not begin until the mid-18th century, which marked the emergence of modern archaeology. Initial efforts to unearth the city were haphazard or marred by looting, resulting in many items or sites being damaged or destroyed. By 1960, most of Pompeii had been uncovered but left in decay; further major excavations were banned or limited to targeted, prioritised areas. Since 2018, these efforts have led to new discoveries in some previously unexplored areas of the city.

Pompeii is a UNESCO World Heritage Site, owing to its status as "the only archaeological site in the world that provides a complete picture of an ancient Roman city". It is among the most popular tourist attractions in Italy, with approximately 2.5 million visitors annually.

== Etymology ==
Pompeii in Latin is a second declension masculine nominative plural noun (Pompeiī, -ōrum). According to Theodor Kraus, "The root of the word Pompeii would appear to be the Oscan word for the number five, pompe, which suggests that either the community consisted of five hamlets or perhaps it was settled by a family group (gens Pompeia)."

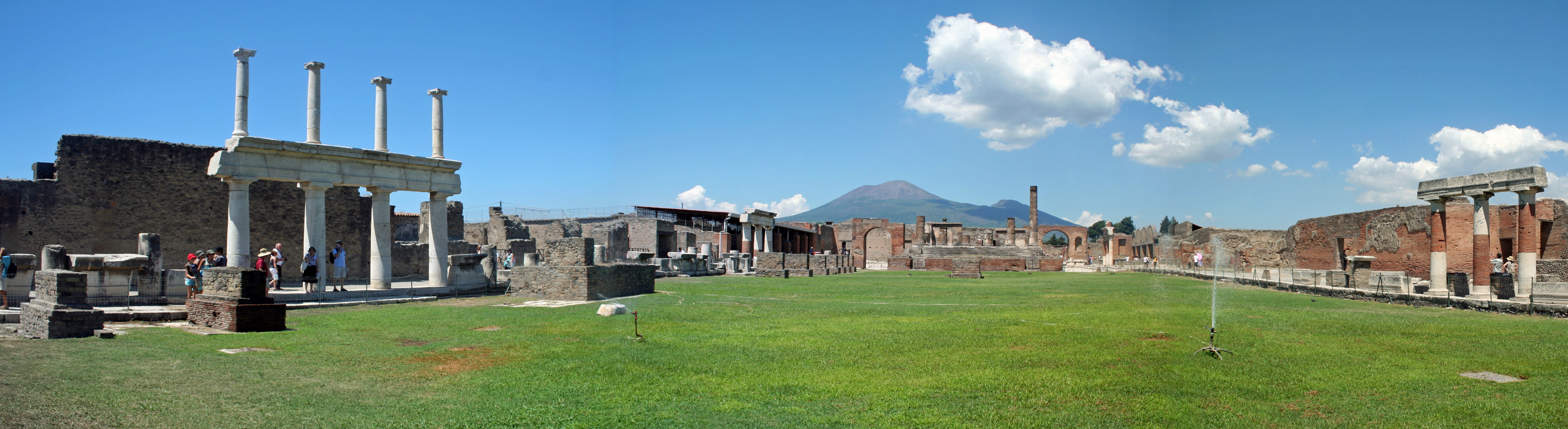
The Forum of Pompeii with the entrances to the Basilica (left) and Macellum (right), the Temple of Jupiter (front) and Mount Vesuvius in the distance

== Geography ==
Pompeii was built approximately 40 m (130 ft) above sea level on a coastal lava plateau created by earlier eruptions of Mount Vesuvius (8 km or 5 mi distant). The plateau fell steeply to the south and partly to the west into the sea. Three layers of sediment from large landslides lie on top of the lava, perhaps triggered by extended rainfall. The city, once by the shoreline, is today circa 700 m (2,300 ft) inland. The mouth of the navigable Sarno River, adjacent to the city, was protected by lagoons and served early Greek and Phoenician sailors as a haven port, later developed by the Romans.

Pompeii covered a total of 64 to 67 hectares (160 to 170 acres) and was home to 11,000 to 11,500 people, based on household counts.

== History ==
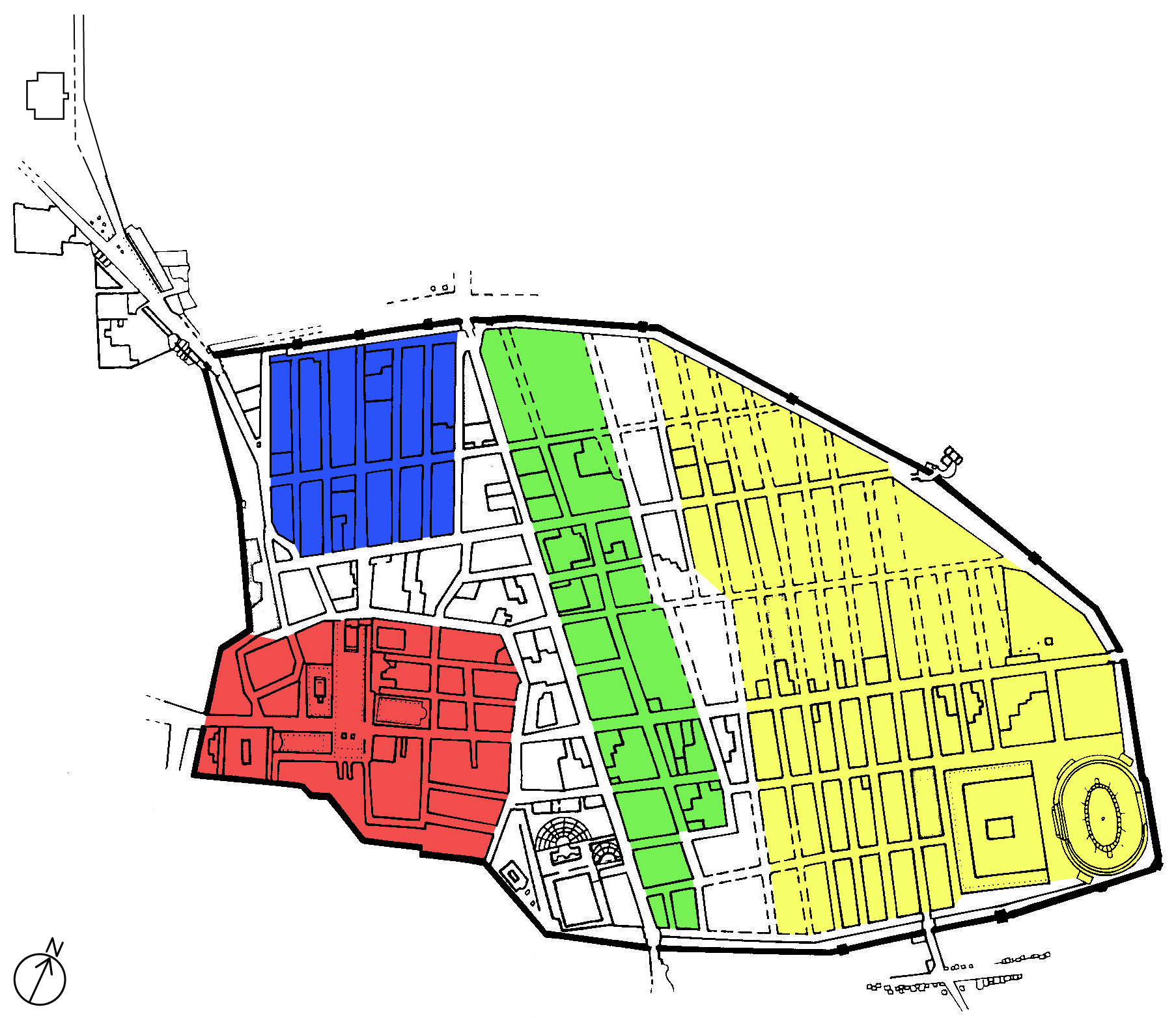
Settlement phases of Pompeii First (Samnite) town First expansion, 4th century BC Second expansion Roman expansion, from 89 BC

Although best known for its Roman remains visible today, dating from AD 79, it was built upon a substantial city dating from much earlier times. Expansion of the city from an early nucleus (the old town) accelerated after 450 BC under the Greeks following the Battle of Cumae.

=== Early history ===
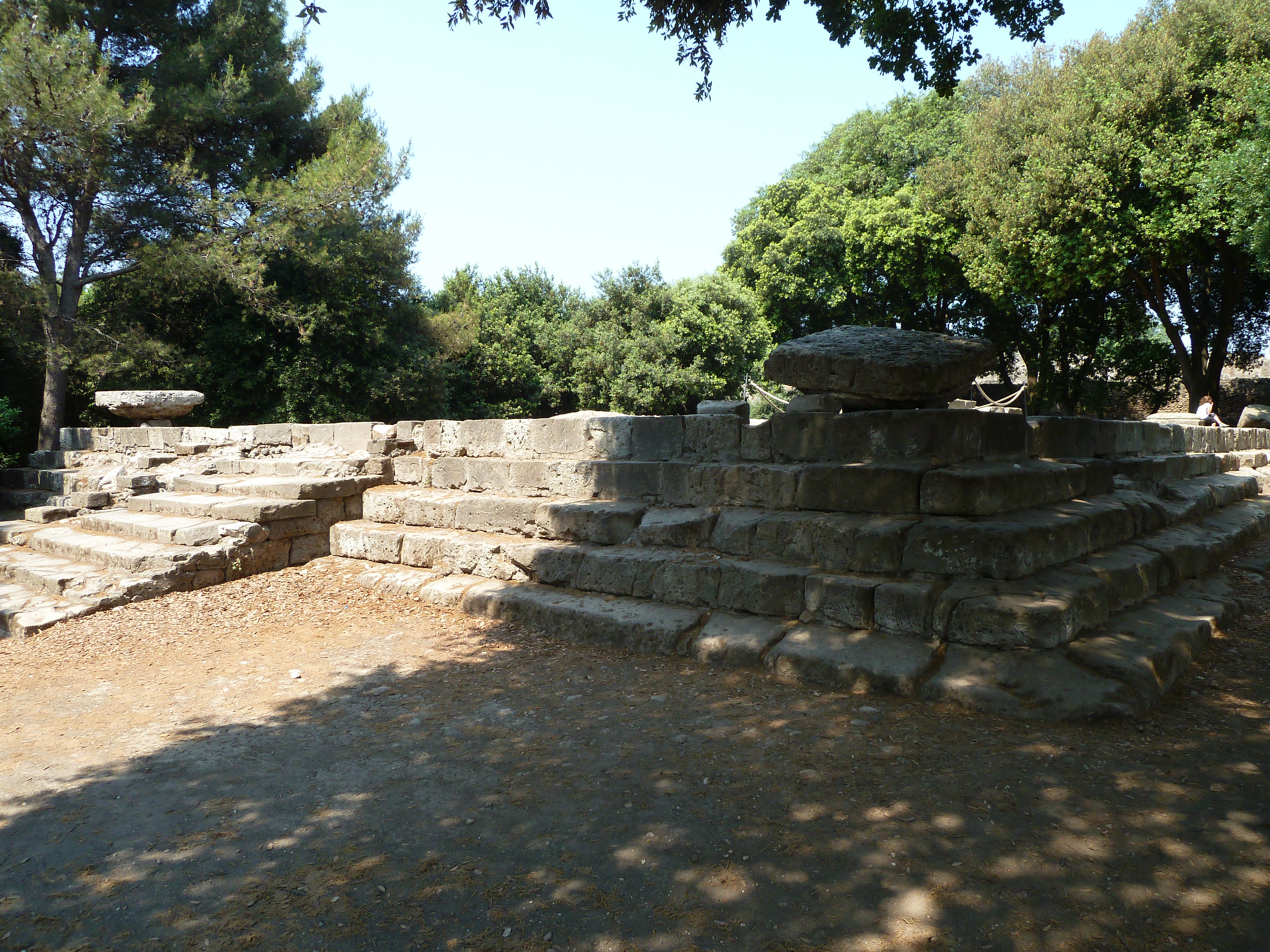
Greek Doric Temple (6th century BC) in Triangular Forum

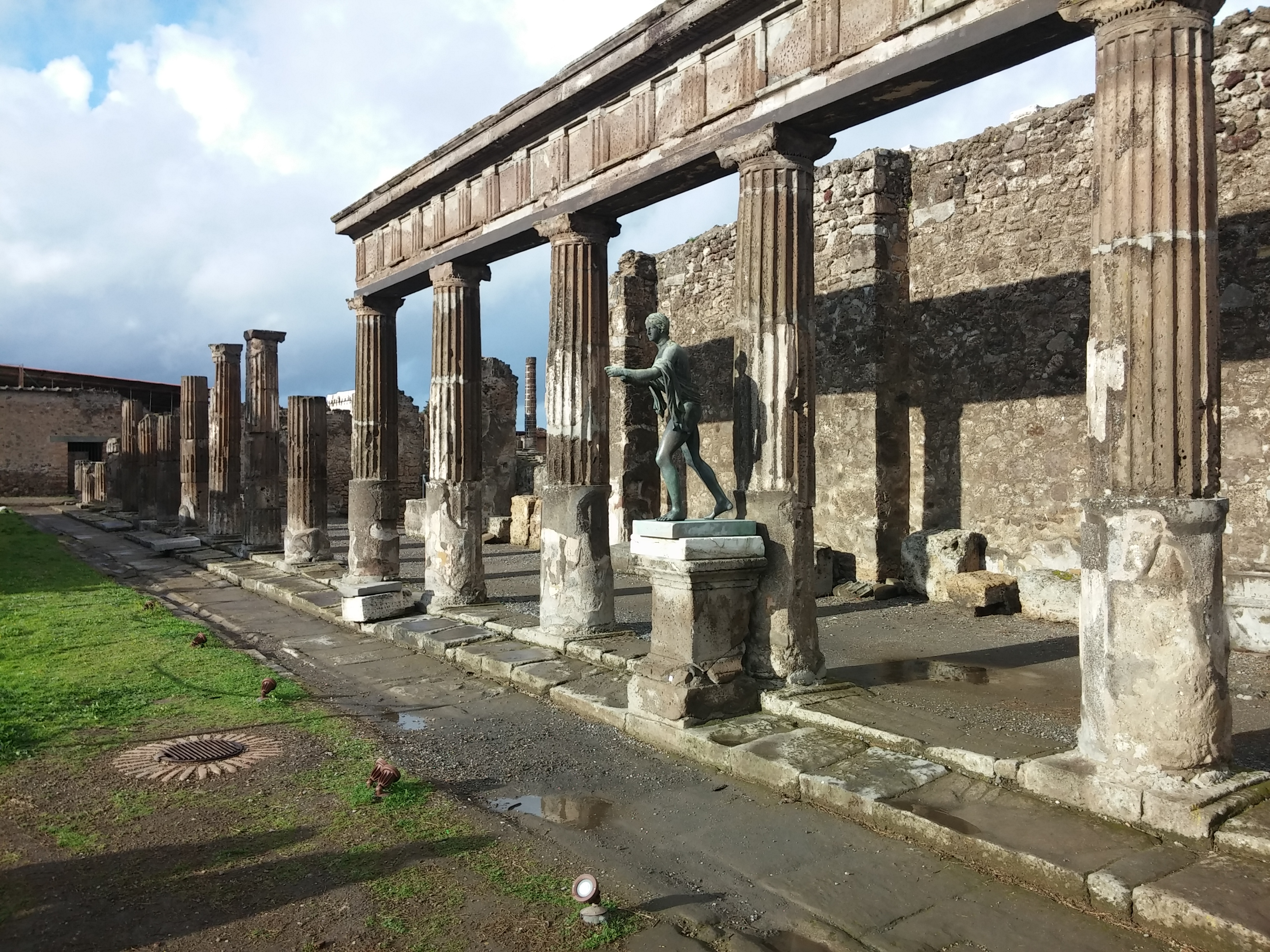
Etruscan Temple of Apollo

The first stable settlements on the site date to the 8th century BC when the Oscans, a population of central Italy, founded five villages in the area.

With the arrival of the Greeks in Campania from around 740 BC, Pompeii entered the orbit of the Hellenic people. The most important building of this period is the Doric Temple, built away from the centre in what would later become the Triangular Forum. At the same time the cult of Apollo was introduced. Greek and Phoenician sailors used the location as a safe port.

In the early 6th century BC, the settlement merged into a single community centred on the important crossroad between Cumae, Nola, and Stabiae and was surrounded by a tufa city wall (the pappamonte wall). The first wall (which was also used as a base for the later wall) unusually enclosed a much greater area than the early town together with much agricultural land. That such an impressive wall was built at this time indicates that the settlement was already important and wealthy. The city began to flourish and maritime trade started with the construction of a small port near the mouth of the river. The earliest settlement was focused in regions VII and VIII of the town (the old town) as identified from stratigraphy below the Samnite and Roman buildings, as well as from the different and irregular street plan.

By 524 BC the Etruscans had settled in the area, including Pompeii, finding in the river Sarno a communication route between the sea and the interior. Like the Greeks, the Etruscans did not conquer the city militarily, but simply controlled it, and Pompeii enjoyed a sort of autonomy. Nevertheless, Pompeii became a member of the Etruscan League of cities. Excavations in 1980–1981 have shown the presence of Etruscan inscriptions and a 6th-century BC necropolis. Under the Etruscans, a primitive forum or simple market square was built, as well as the Temple of Apollo, in both of which objects including fragments of bucchero were found by Maiuri. Several houses were built with the so-called Tuscan atrium, typical of this people.

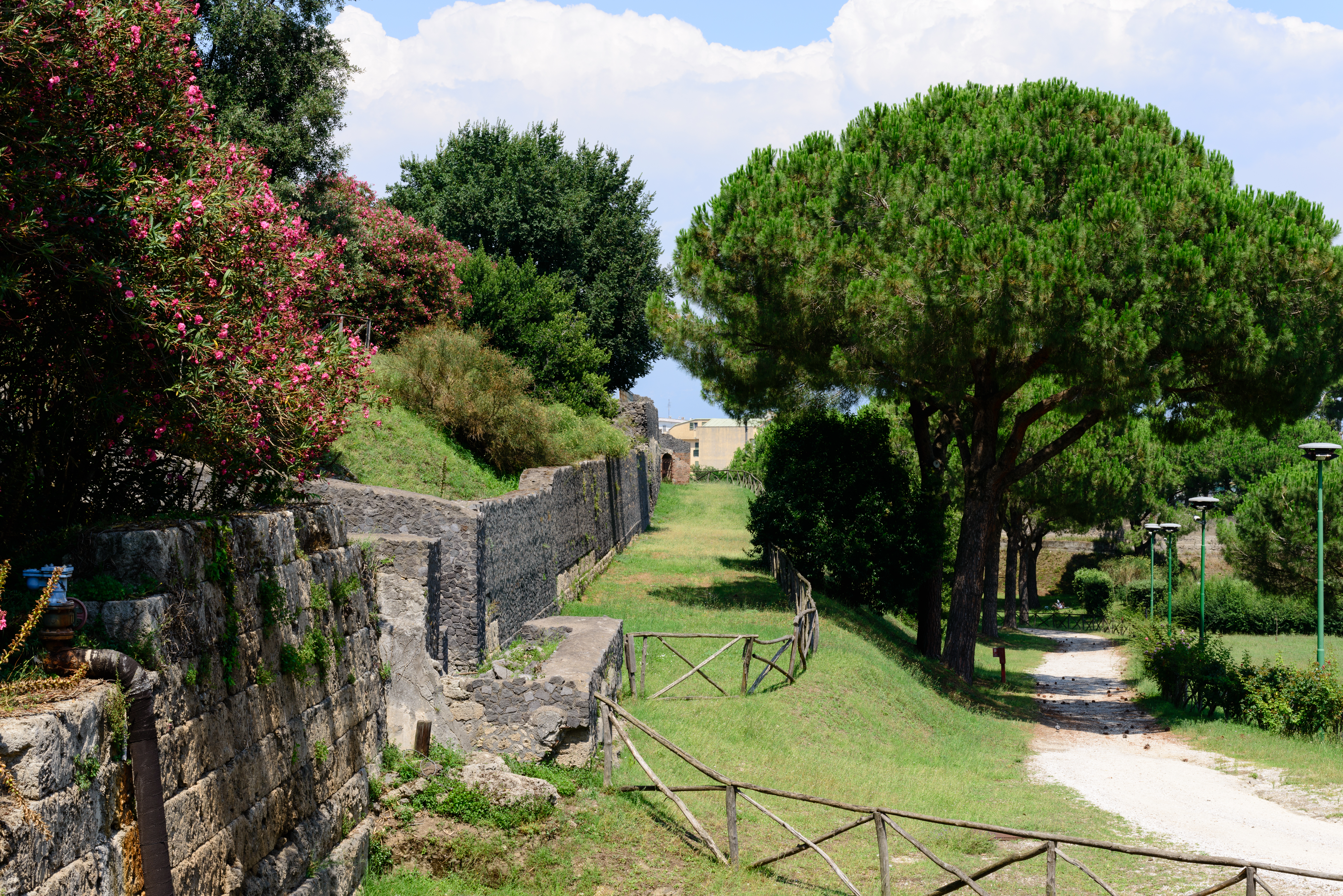
City walls

The city wall was strengthened in the early 5th century BC with two façades of relatively thin, vertically set slabs of Sarno limestone some four metres (13 ft) apart filled with earth (the orthostate wall).

In 474 BC, the Greek city of Cumae, allied with Syracuse, defeated the Etruscans at the Battle of Cumae and gained control of the area.

=== The Samnite period ===
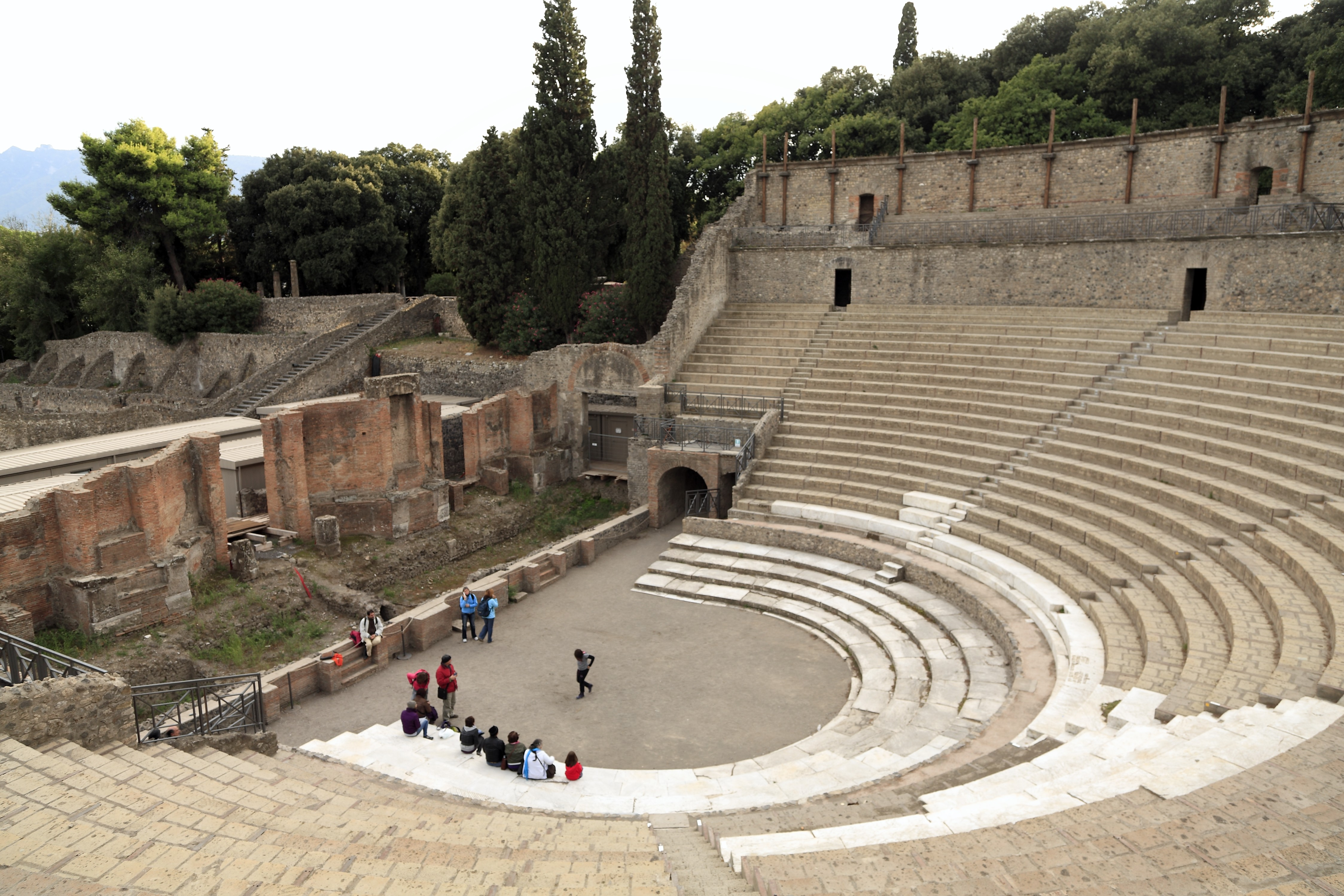
Large Theatre

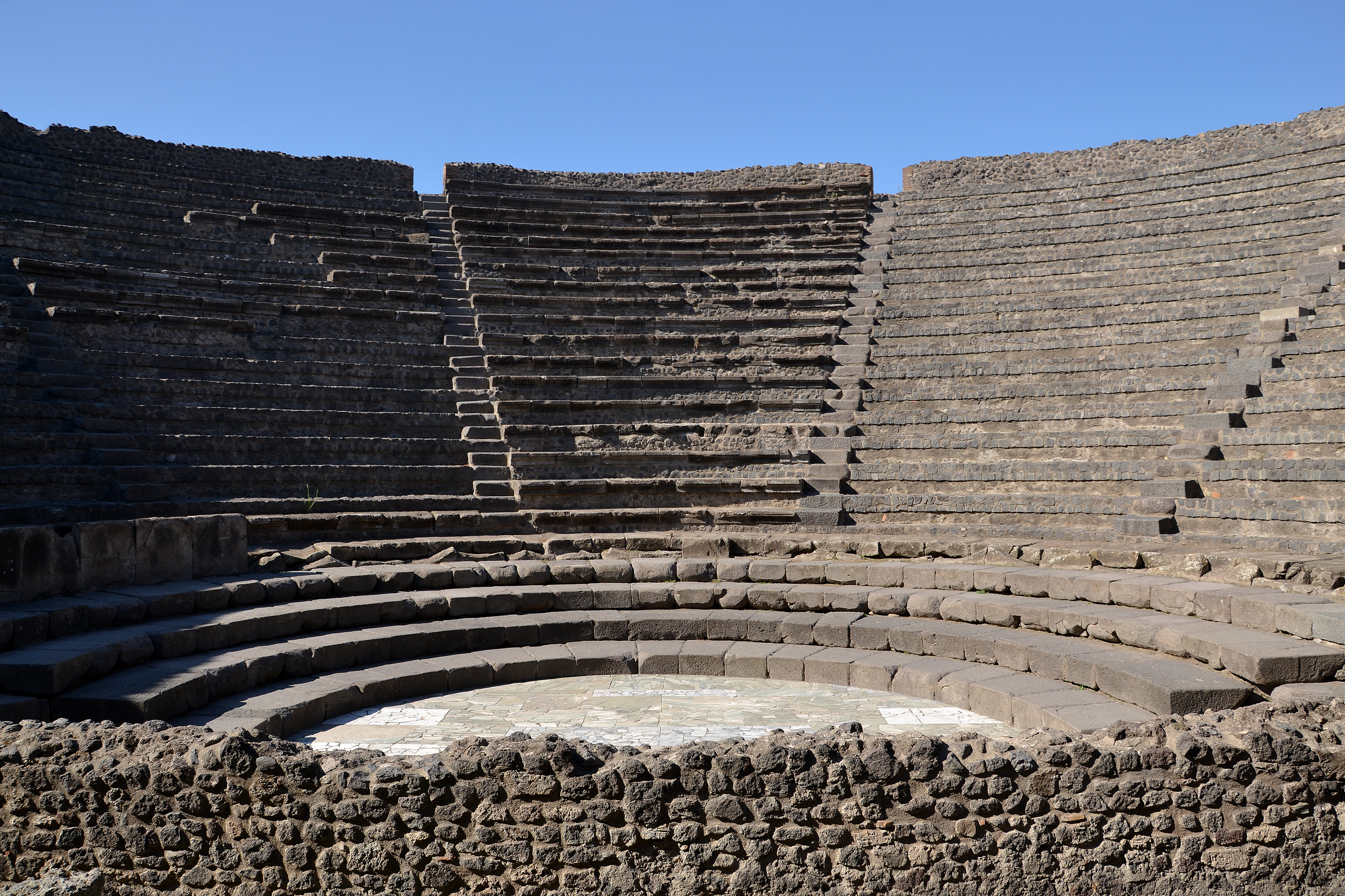
Odeon

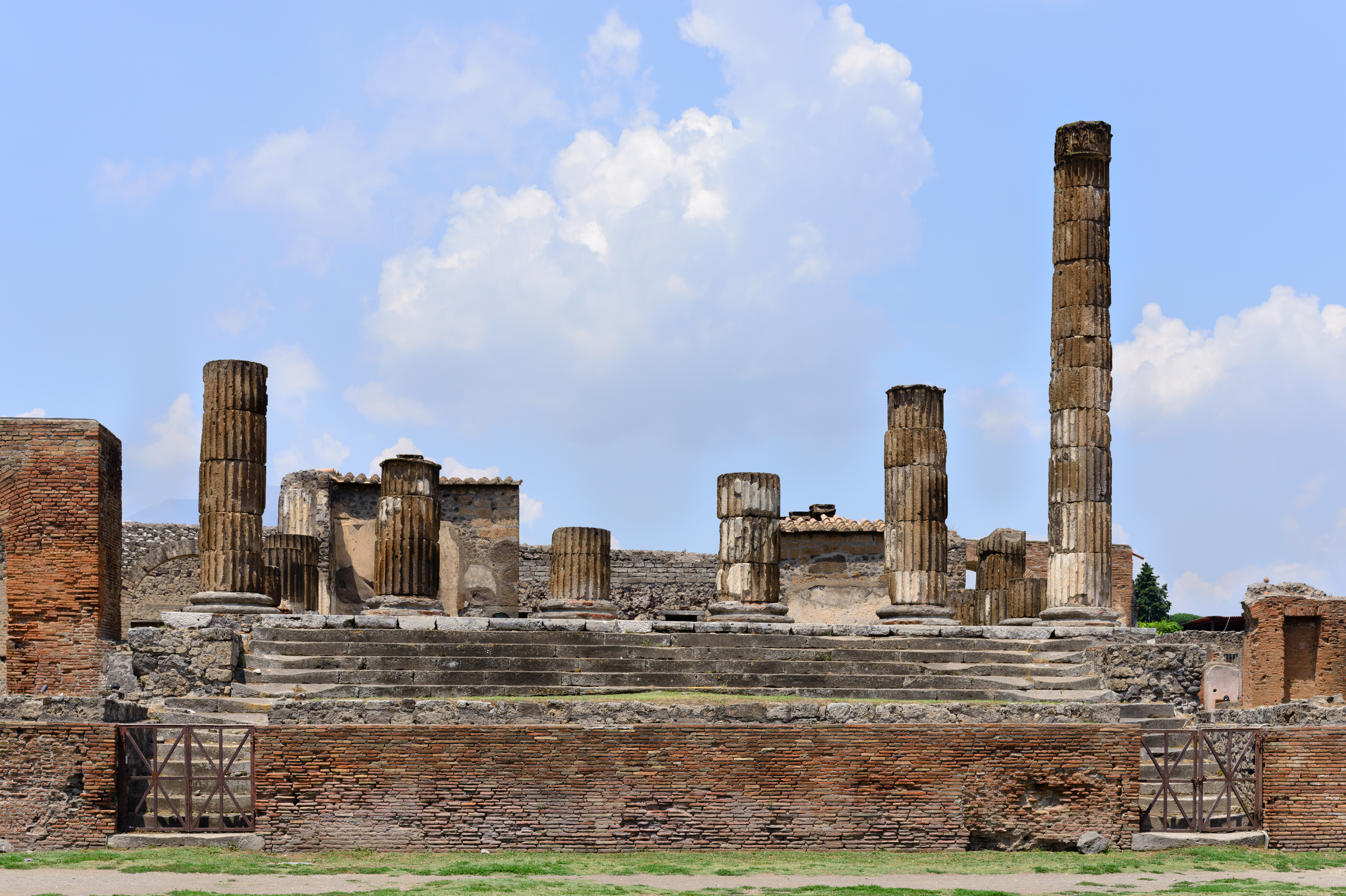
The Temple of Jupiter (2nd century BC)

The period between about 450–375 BC witnessed large areas of the city being abandoned while important sanctuaries such as the Temple of Apollo show a sudden lack of votive material remains.

The Samnites, people from the areas of Abruzzo and Molise, and allies of the Romans, conquered Greek Cumae between 423 and 420 BC. It is likely that all of the surrounding territory, including Pompeii, was already conquered around 424 BC. The new rulers gradually imposed their architecture and enlarged the town.

From 343 to 341 BC in the Samnite Wars, the first Roman army entered the Campanian plain bringing with it the customs and traditions of Rome, and in the Roman Latin War from 340 BC, the Samnites were faithful to Rome. Although governed by the Samnites, Pompeii entered the Roman orbit, to which it remained faithful even during the third Samnite war and in the war against Pyrrhus. In the late 4th century BC, the city began expanding from its nucleus into the open-walled area. The street plan of the new areas was more regular and more conformal to Hippodamus's street plan. The city walls were reinforced in Sarno stone in the early 3rd century BC (the limestone enceinte, or the "first Samnite wall"). It formed the basis for the currently visible walls with an outer wall of rectangular limestone blocks as a terrace wall supporting a large agger, or earth embankment, behind it.

After the Samnite Wars from 290 BC, Pompeii was forced to accept the status of socii of Rome, maintaining, however, linguistic and administrative autonomy.

From the outbreak of the Second Punic War (218–201 BC) in which Hannibal's invasion threatened many cities, Pompeii remained faithful to Rome unlike many of the southern cities. As a result, an additional internal wall was built of tufa and the internal agger and outer façade raised, resulting in a double parapet with a wider wall-walk. Despite the political uncertainty of these events and the progressive migration of wealthy men to quieter cities in the eastern Mediterranean, Pompeii continued to flourish due to the production and trade of wine and oil with places like Provence and Spain, as well as to intensive agriculture on farms around the city.

In the 2nd century BC, Pompeii enriched itself by taking part in Rome's conquest of the east, as shown by a statue of Apollo in the Forum erected by Lucius Mummius in gratitude for their support in the sack of Corinth and the eastern campaigns. These riches enabled Pompeii to bloom and expand to its ultimate limits. The Forum and many public and private buildings of high architectural quality were built, including The Large Theatre, the Temple of Jupiter, the Basilica, the Comitium, the Stabian Baths, and a new two-story portico.

=== The Roman period ===
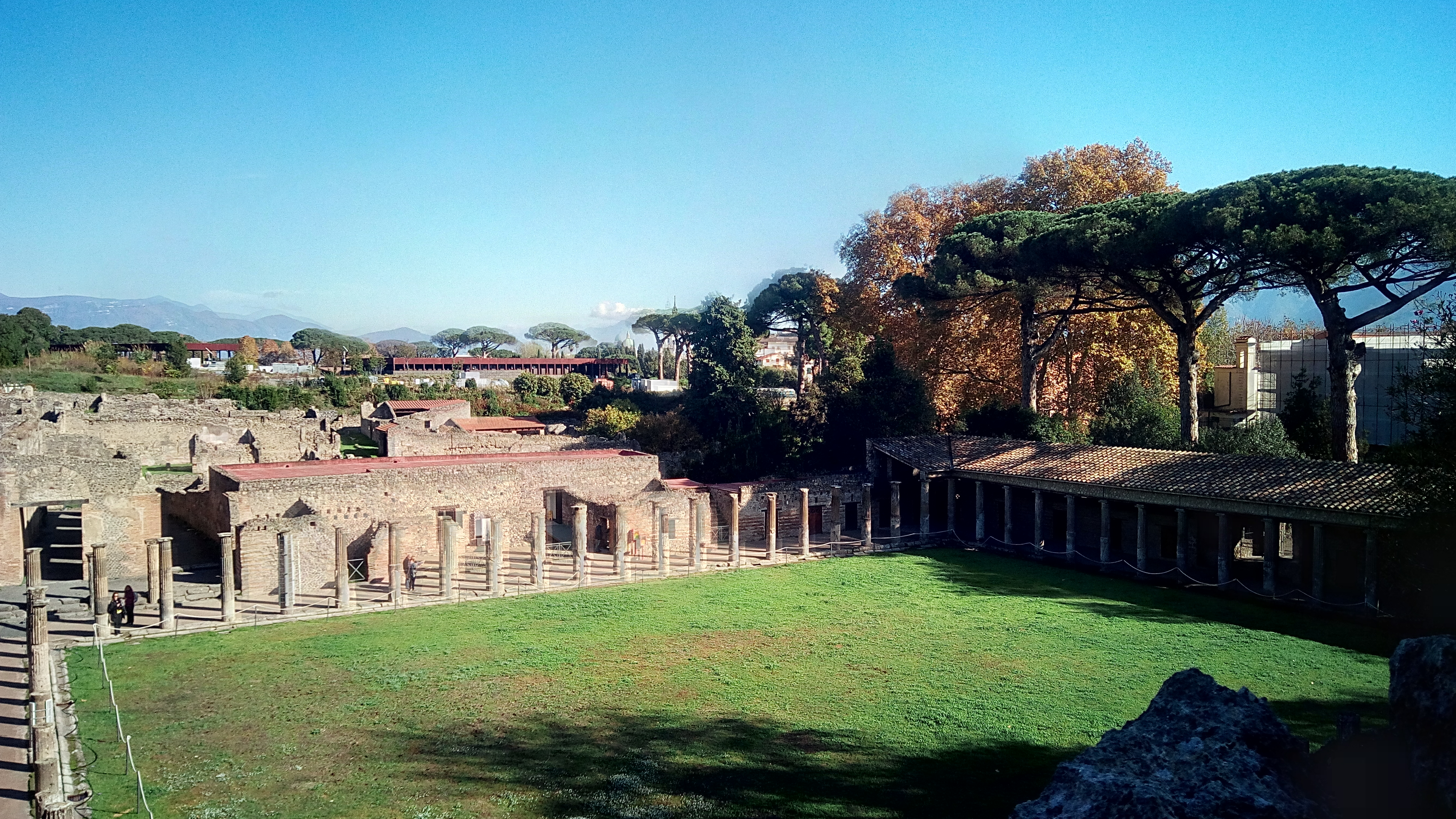
Gladiator barracks

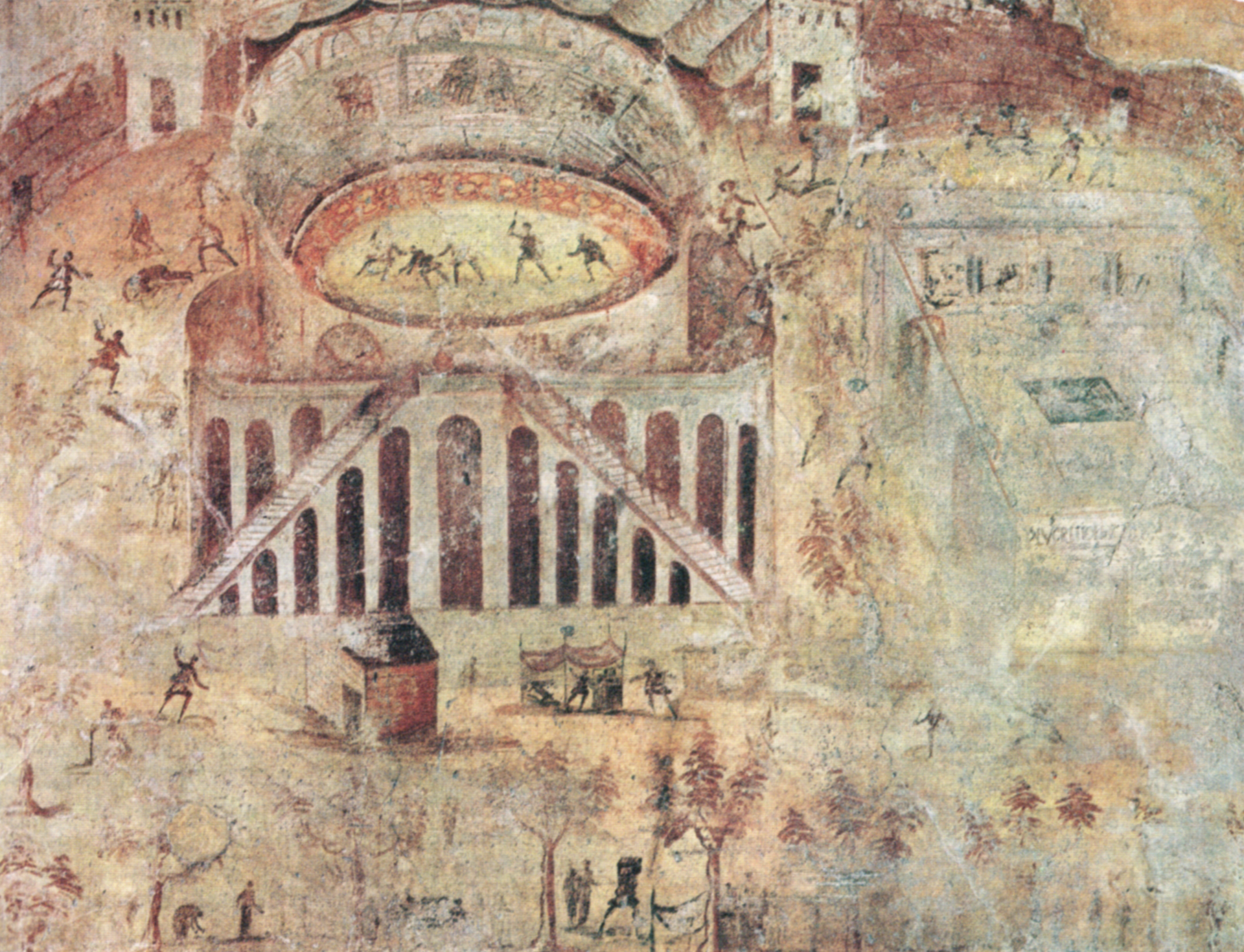
Fresco depicting the fight in the amphitheatre between Pompeians and Nucerians

Pompeii was one of the towns of Campania that rebelled against Rome in the Social Wars and in 89 BC it was besieged by Sulla, who targeted the strategically vulnerable Porta Ercolano with his artillery as can still be seen by the impact craters of thousands of ballista shots in the walls. Many nearby buildings inside the walls were also destroyed. Although the battle-hardened troops of the Social League, headed by Lucius Cluentius, helped in resisting the Romans, Pompeii was forced to surrender after the conquest of Nola. The result was that Pompeii became a Roman colony named Colonia Cornelia Veneria Pompeianorum. Many of Sulla's veterans were given land and property in and around the city, while many who opposed Rome were dispossessed of their property. Despite this, the Pompeians were granted Roman citizenship and quickly assimilated into the Roman world. The main language in the city became Latin, and many of Pompeii's old aristocratic families Latinized their names as a sign of assimilation.

The area around Pompeii became very prosperous due to the desirability of living on the Bay of Naples for wealthy Romans and due to the rich agricultural land. Many farms and villas were built nearby, outside the city and many have been excavated. These include the Villa of the Mysteries, Villa of Diomedes, several at Boscoreale, Boscotrecase, Oplontis, Terzigno, and Civita Guiliana.

The city became an important passage for goods that arrived by sea and had to be sent toward Rome or Southern Italy along the nearby Appian Way. Many public buildings were constructed or refurbished and improved under the new order; new buildings included the Amphitheatre of Pompeii in 70 BC, the Forum Baths, and the Odeon. In comparison, the Forum was embellished with the colonnade of Popidius before 80 BC. These buildings raised the status of Pompeii as a cultural centre in the region as it outshone its neighbours in the number of places for entertainment which significantly enhanced the social and economic development of the city.

Under Augustus, from about 30 BC, a major expansion in new public buildings, as in the rest of the empire, included the Eumachia Building, the Sanctuary of Augustus and the Macellum. From about 20 BC, Pompeii was fed with running water by a spur from the Serino Aqueduct, built by Marcus Vipsanius Agrippa.

In AD 59, there was a serious riot and bloodshed in the amphitheatre between Pompeians and Nucerians (which is recorded in a fresco) and which led the Roman Senate to send the Praetorian Guard to restore order and to ban further events for ten years.

==== AD 62–79 ====
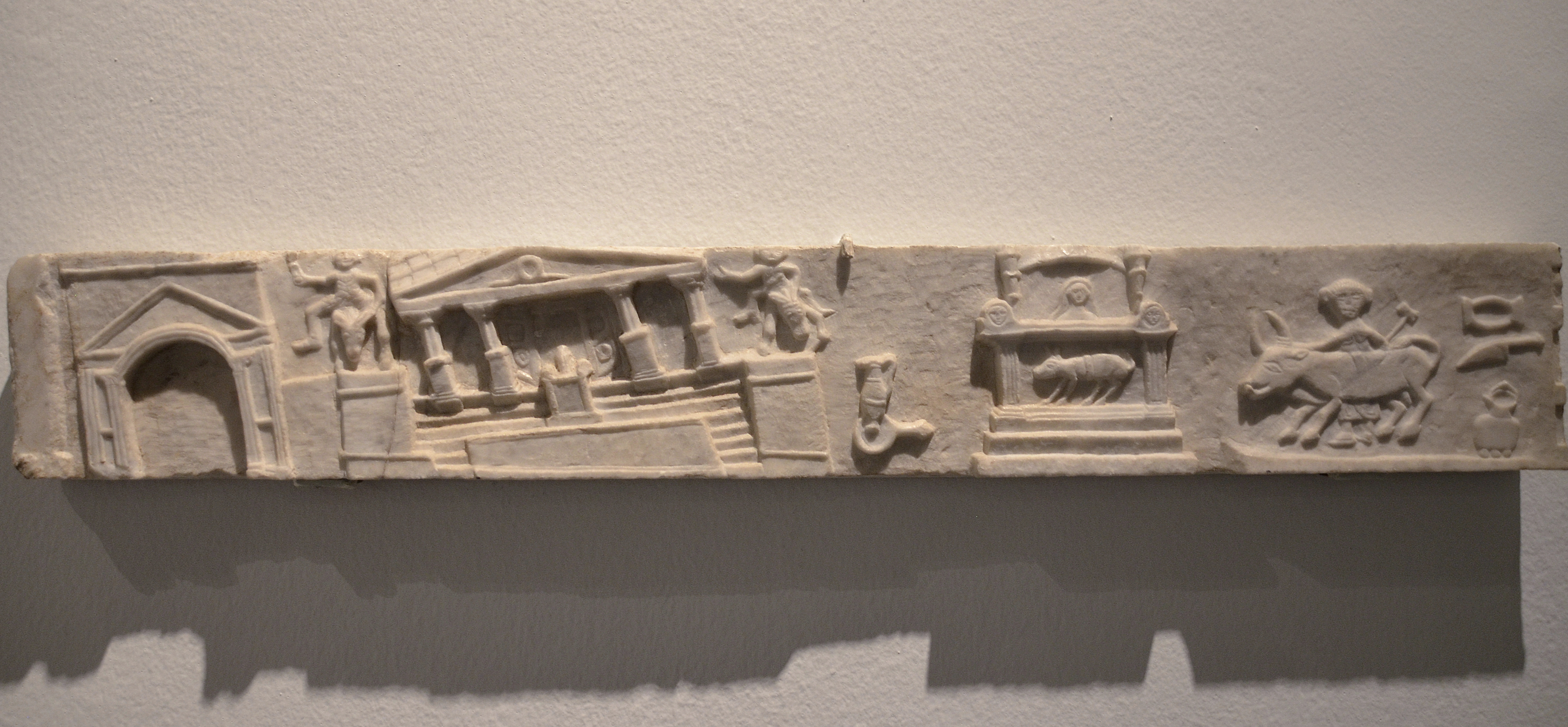
Tilting buildings in the Forum of Pompeii during the AD 62 earthquake showing damage to Pompeii's Temple of Jupiter (relief from the House of Lucius Caecilius Iucundus)

The inhabitants of Pompeii had long been used to minor earthquakes (indeed, the writer Pliny the Younger wrote that earth tremors "were not particularly alarming because they are frequent in Campania"), but on 5 February 62 a severe earthquake did considerable damage around the bay, and particularly to Pompeii. It is believed that the earthquake would have registered between 5 and 6 on the Richter magnitude scale.

On that day in Pompeii, there were to be two sacrifices, as it was the anniversary of Augustus being named Pater Patriae ("Father of the Country") and also a feast day to honour the guardian spirits of the city. Chaos followed the earthquake; fires caused by oil lamps that had fallen during the quake added to the panic. The nearby cities of Herculaneum and Nuceria were also affected.

Between 62 AD and the eruption in 79 AD, most rebuilding was done in the private sector and older, damaged frescoes were often covered with newer ones. In the public sector, the opportunity was taken to improve buildings and the city plan, e.g. in the Forum.

An important field of current research concerns structures that were restored between the earthquake of 62 and the eruption. It was thought until recently that some of the damage had still not been repaired at the time of the eruption, but this is doubtful as the evidence of missing forum statues and marble wall veneers are most likely due to robbers after the city's burial. The public buildings on the east side of the Forum were largely restored and were enhanced by beautiful marble veneers and other modifications to the architecture.

Some buildings like the Central Baths were only started after the earthquake and were built to enhance the city with modern developments in their architecture, as had been done in Rome, in terms of wall-heating and window glass, and with well-lit spacious rooms. The new baths took over a whole insula by demolishing houses, which may have been made easier by the earthquake that had damaged these houses. This shows that the city was still flourishing rather than struggling to recover from the earthquake.

In about 64, Nero and his wife Poppaea visited Pompeii and made gifts to the temple of Venus (the city's patron deity), probably when he performed in the theatre of Naples.

By 79, Pompeii had a population of 20,000, which had prospered from the region's renowned agricultural fertility and favourable location, although more recent estimates are up to 11,500 based on household counts.

=== Eruption of Vesuvius ===
Pompeii and other cities affected by the eruption of Mount Vesuvius. The black cloud represents the general distribution of ash and cinder. Modern coast lines are shown.

In 79 AD, Mount Vesuvius erupted, causing one of the deadliest eruptions in history. The eruption lasted for two days. The first phase was of pumice rain (lapilli) lasting about 18 hours, allowing most inhabitants to escape. Only approximately 1,150 bodies have been found on site, which seems to confirm this theory, and most escapees probably managed to salvage some of their most valuable belongings; many skeletons were found with jewellery, coins, and silverware.

At some time in the night or early the next day, pyroclastic flows began near the volcano, consisting of high speed, dense, and scorching ash clouds, knocking down wholly or partly all structures in their path, incinerating or suffocating the remaining population and altering the landscape, including the coastline. By the evening of the second day, the eruption was over, leaving only haze in the atmosphere through which the sun shone weakly.

A multidisciplinary volcanological and bio-anthropological study of the eruption products and victims, merged with numerical simulations and experiments, indicates that at Pompeii and surrounding towns heat was the main cause of death of people, previously believed to have died by ash suffocation. The results of the study, published in 2010, show that exposure to at least 250 °C (480 °F) hot pyroclastic flows at a distance of 10 kilometres (6 miles) from the vent was sufficient to cause instant death, even if people were sheltered within buildings. The people and buildings of Pompeii were covered in up to twelve different layers of tephra, in total, up to 6 metres (19.7 ft) deep. Archaeology in 2023 showed that some buildings collapsed due to one or more earthquakes during the eruption, killing the occupants.

Pliny the Younger provided a first-hand account of the eruption of Mount Vesuvius from his position across the Bay of Naples at Misenum, but it was written approximately 27 or 28 years after the event. His uncle, Pliny the Elder, with whom he had a close relationship, died while attempting to rescue stranded victims. As admiral of the fleet, Pliny the Elder had ordered the ships of the Imperial Navy stationed at Misenum to cross the bay to assist evacuation attempts. Volcanologists have recognised the importance of Pliny the Younger's account of the eruption by calling similar events "Plinian". It had long been thought that the eruption was an August event based on one version of the letter, but another version gives a date of the eruption as late as 23 November. A later date is consistent with a charcoal inscription at the site, discovered in 2018, which includes the date of 17 October and which must have been recently written. A collaborative study in 2022 determined a date of 24–25 October.

An October or November eruption is supported by many pieces of evidence: the fact that people buried in the ash appear to have been wearing heavier clothing than the light summer clothes typical of August; the fresh fruit and vegetables in the shops are typical of October – and conversely the summer fruit typical of August was already being sold in dried, or conserved form; nuts from chestnut trees were found at Oplontis, which would not have been mature before mid-September; wine fermenting jars had been sealed, which would have happened around the end of October; coins found in the purse of a woman buried in the ash include one with a 15th imperatorial acclamation among the emperor's titles, which could not have been minted before the second week of September.

=== Rediscovery and excavations ===
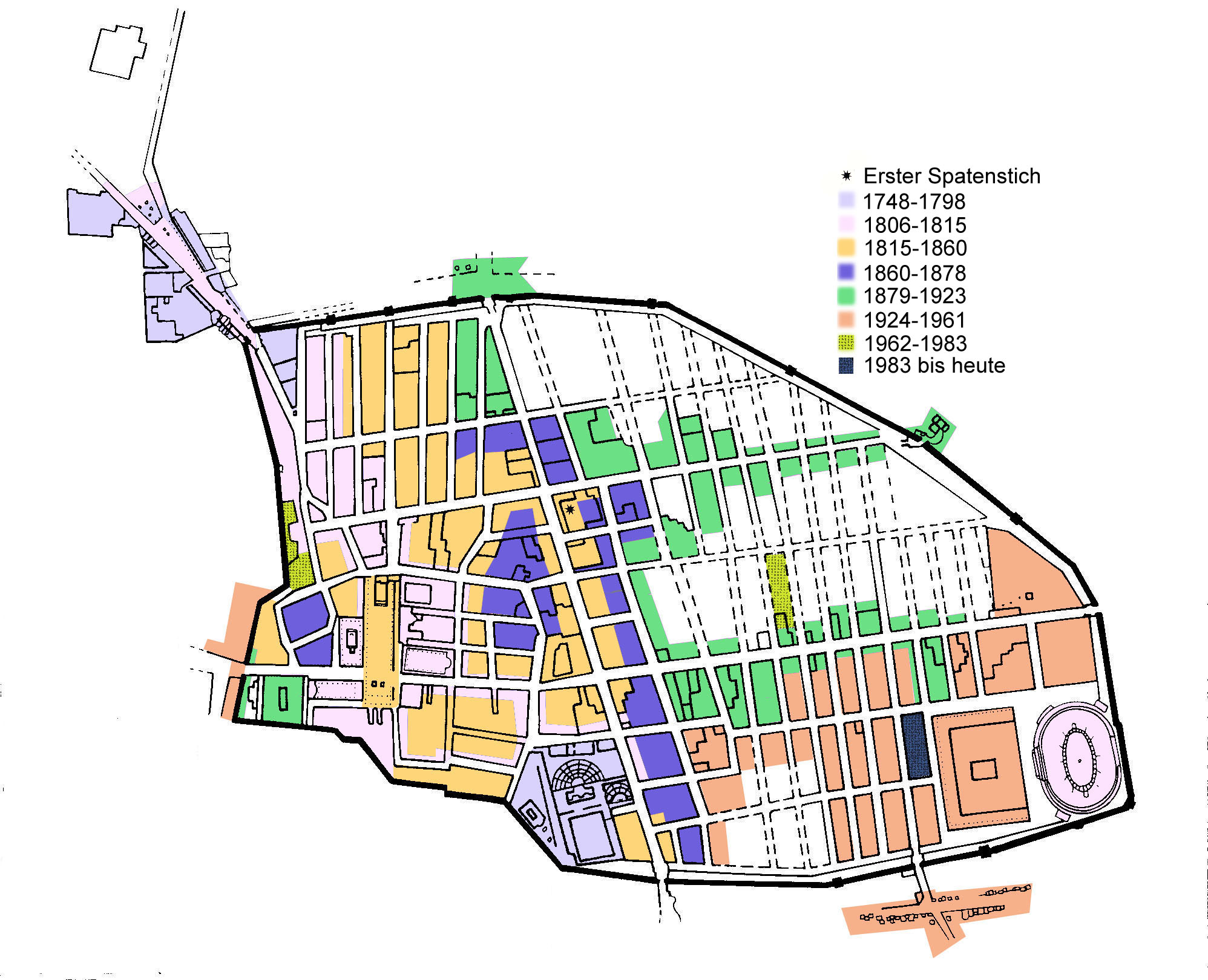
Periods/areas of excavations

Titus appointed two ex-consuls to organise a relief effort while donating large amounts of money from the imperial treasury to aid the victims of the volcano. He visited Pompeii once after the eruption and again the following year but no work was done on recovery.

Soon after the city's burial, survivors and possibly thieves came to salvage valuables, including the marble statues from the Forum and other precious materials from buildings. There is wide evidence of post-eruption disturbance, including holes made through walls. The city was not completely buried, and the tops of larger buildings would have been visible above the ash, making it obvious where to dig or salvage building material. The robbers left traces of their passage, as in a house where modern archaeologists found a wall graffito saying "house dug".

Archaeological evidence suggests that following the eruption, the site was reoccupied by survivors as a small informal settlement that lasted until the fifth century. Over the following centuries, its name and location were forgotten, though it appeared on the Tabula Peutingeriana of the 4th century. Further eruptions, particularly in 471–473 and 512, covered the remains more deeply. The area became known as La Civita (the city) due to the features in the ground.

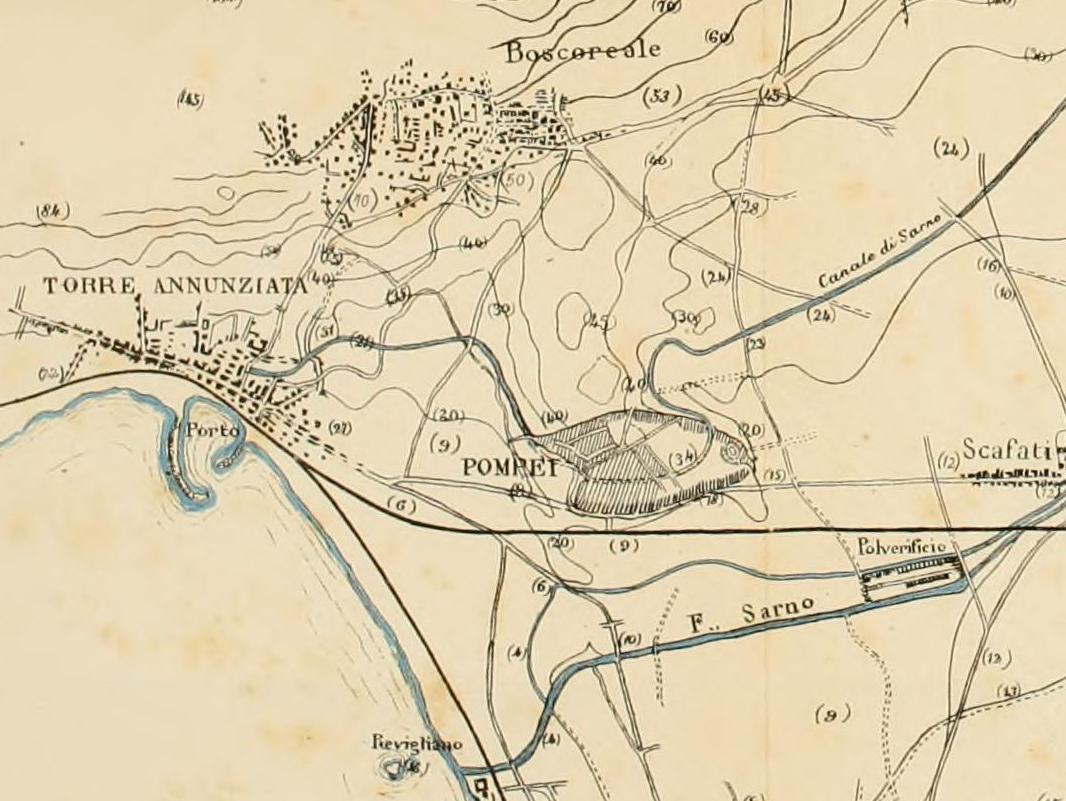
Plan of Fontana's aqueduct through Pompeii

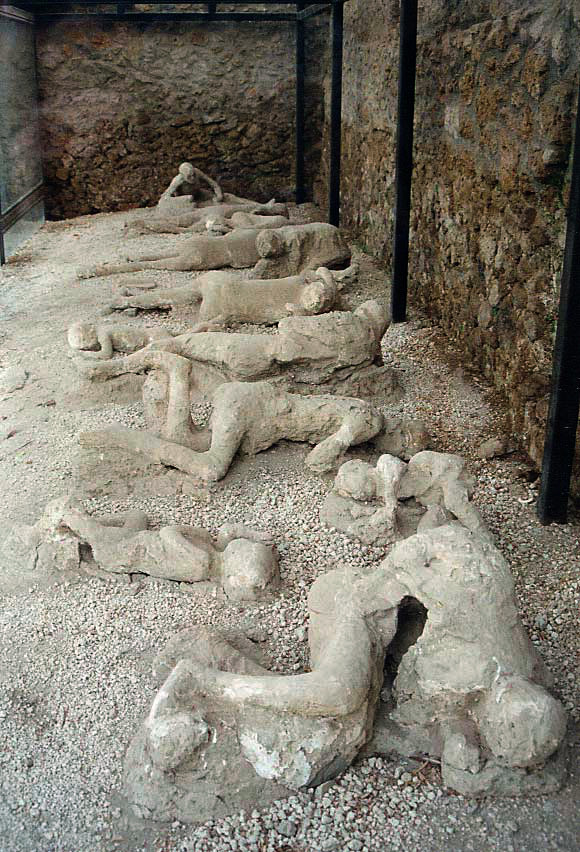
The Garden of the Fugitives: plaster casts of victims still in situ; many casts are in the Archaeological Museum of Naples.

The next known date that any part was unearthed was in 1592, when architect Domenico Fontana, while digging an underground aqueduct to the mills of Torre Annunziata, ran into ancient walls covered with paintings and inscriptions. His aqueduct passed through and underneath a large part of the city and would have had to pass through many buildings and foundations, as they still can be seen in many places today. However, he kept the finding secret.

In 1689, Francesco Picchetti saw a wall inscription mentioning decurio Pompeiis ("town councillor of Pompeii"), but he associated it with a villa of Pompey. Francesco Bianchini pointed out the true meaning, and he was supported by Giuseppe Macrini, who in 1693 excavated some walls and wrote that Pompeii lay beneath La Civita.

Herculaneum was rediscovered in 1738 by workers digging for the foundations of a summer palace for the King of Naples, Charles of Bourbon. Due to the spectacular quality of the finds, the Spanish military engineer Roque Joaquín de Alcubierre made excavations to find further remains at the site of Pompeii in 1748, even if the city was not identified. Charles of Bourbon took great interest in the finds, even after leaving to become king of Spain because the display of antiquities reinforced Naples' political and cultural prestige. On 20 August 1763, an inscription [...] Rei Publicae Pompeianorum [...] was found and the city was identified as Pompeii.

Karl Weber directed the first scientific excavations. He was followed in 1764 by military engineer Franscisco la Vega, who was succeeded by his brother, Pietro, in 1804.

There was much progress in exploration when the French occupied Naples in 1799 and ruled over Italy from 1806 to 1815. The land on which Pompeii lies was confiscated, and up to 700 workers were employed in the excavations. The excavated areas in the north and south were connected. Parts of the Via dell'Abbondanza were also exposed in the west–east direction, and for the first time, an impression of the size and appearance of the ancient town could be appreciated. In the following years, the excavators struggled with a lack of money. Excavations progressed slowly, but with significant finds such as the houses of the Faun, of Menandro, of the Tragic Poet and the Surgeon.

Fiorelli's plan of regiones

Giuseppe Fiorelli took charge of the excavations in 1863 and made greater progress. During early excavations of the site, occasional voids in the ash layer had been found that contained human remains. Fiorelli realised these were spaces left by the decomposed bodies, and so devised the technique of injecting plaster into them to recreate the forms of Vesuvius's victims. This technique is still in use today, with a clear resin now used instead of plaster because it is more durable and does not destroy the bones, allowing further analysis.

Fiorelli also introduced scientific documentation. He divided the city into today's nine areas (regiones) and blocks (insulae) and numbered the entrances of the individual houses (domus). Fiorelli also published the first periodical with excavation reports. Under his successors, the entire west section of the city was exposed.

=== Modern archaeology ===
Map of Pompeii

After those of Fiorelli, excavations continued in an increasingly more systematic and considered manner under several directors of archaeology though still with the main interest in making spectacular discoveries and uncovering more houses rather than answering the main questions about the city and its long term preservation.

In the 1920s, Amedeo Maiuri excavated older layers beneath those of 79 AD for the first time to learn about the settlement history. Maiuri made the last excavations on a grand scale in the 1950s, and the area south of the Via dell'Abbondanza and the city wall was almost completely uncovered, but they were poorly documented scientifically. Preservation was haphazard, and his reconstructions were difficult to distinguish from the original ruins, which is a great handicap for studying genuine antique remains. Questionable reconstruction was also done after the severe earthquake of 1980, which caused great destruction. Since then, work has been confined to the excavated areas except for targeted soundings and excavations. Further excavations on a large scale are not planned, and today archaeologists are more engaged in reconstructing, documenting and slowing the decay of the ruins.

In December 2018, archaeologists discovered the remains of harnessed horses in the Villa of the Mysteries.

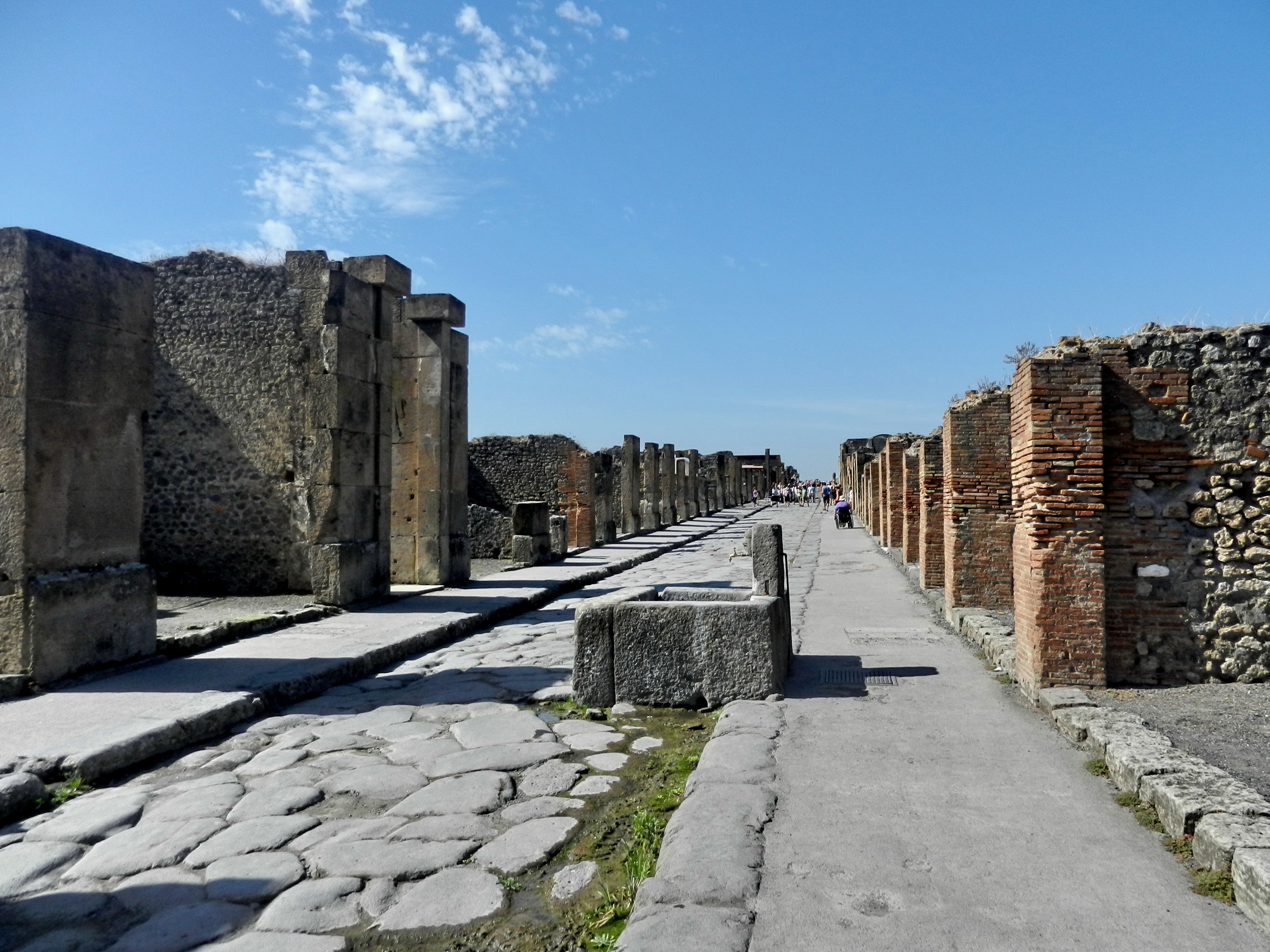
Via dell'Abbondanza, the main street in Pompeii

Under the 'Great Pompeii Project' over 2.5 km (1.6 mi) of ancient walls within the city were relieved of danger of collapse by treating the unexcavated areas behind the street fronts in order to increase drainage and reduce the pressure of groundwater and earth on the walls, a problem especially in the rainy season. These excavations resumed on unexcavated areas of Regio V. In November 2020 the remains of two men, thought to be a rich man and his slave, were found in a 2 m-thick (6.6 ft) layer of ash. They appeared to have escaped the first eruption but were killed by a second blast the next day. A study of the bones showed that the younger one appeared to have done manual labour and hence was likely a slave.

In December 2020, a thermopolium, an inn or snack-bar, was excavated in Regio V. In addition to brightly coloured frescoes depicting some of the food on offer, archaeologists found eight dolia (terracotta pots) still containing remnants of meals, including duck, goat, pig, fish, and snails. They also found a decorated bronze drinking bowl known as a patera, wine flasks, amphorae, and ceramic jars used for cooking stews and soups. One fresco depicts a dog with a collar on a leash, possibly reminding customers to leash their pets. The complete skeleton of a tiny adult dog was also discovered, measuring only about 20–25 cm (7.9–9.8 in) at the shoulder, which provides evidence of the highly selective breeding of dogs in Roman times.

In January 2021 a well-preserved "large, four-wheel ceremonial chariot" was uncovered in the portico of the luxurious villa in Civita Giuliana, north of Pompeii, where a stable had previously been discovered in 2018. The carriage is made of bronze and black and red wooden panels, with engraved silver and bronze medallions at the back. It is now thought to be an elaborate and unique bridal carriage called a pilentum and in 2023 has been restored for display at the Baths of Diocletian. Nearby the bodies of two fugitives had been found using plaster casts, and in a stable the remains of horses, one still in harness.

In 2021, an exceptional 1st century AD painted tomb of a freed slave, Marcus Venerius Secundio, containing mummified human remains, was discovered outside the Porta Sarno gate. Its inscription records he achieved custodianship of the Temple of Venus and membership of the Sodales Augustales, priests of the Imperial Cult. Also, he organised Greek and Latin performances lasting four days, the first evidence of Greek cultural events in Pompeii.

In April 2024, a dining hall lined with rare frescoes was excavated as part of a broader project aimed at shoring up the front of the perimeter between the excavated and unexcavated area of the site. One fresco presents Helen of Troy and Paris, and another depicts Apollo and Princess Cassandra, with Apollo trying to attract the princess's attention. The hall, measuring 15 by 6 metres (49 ft × 20 ft), was located in a house on Via di Nola—one of the main city streets in the Regio IX area. The room walls were painted black, perhaps to hide the traces of soot from the lighting fixtures.

In June 2024, a shrine with rare blue-painted walls covered with paintings of females thought to represent the four seasons (Horae) was discovered. 15 amphorae, two bronze jugs and two bronze lamps were among the findings. The 8 m^{2} (86 sq ft) room is thought to be a sacrarium (the sanctuary of a church).

=== Conservation ===
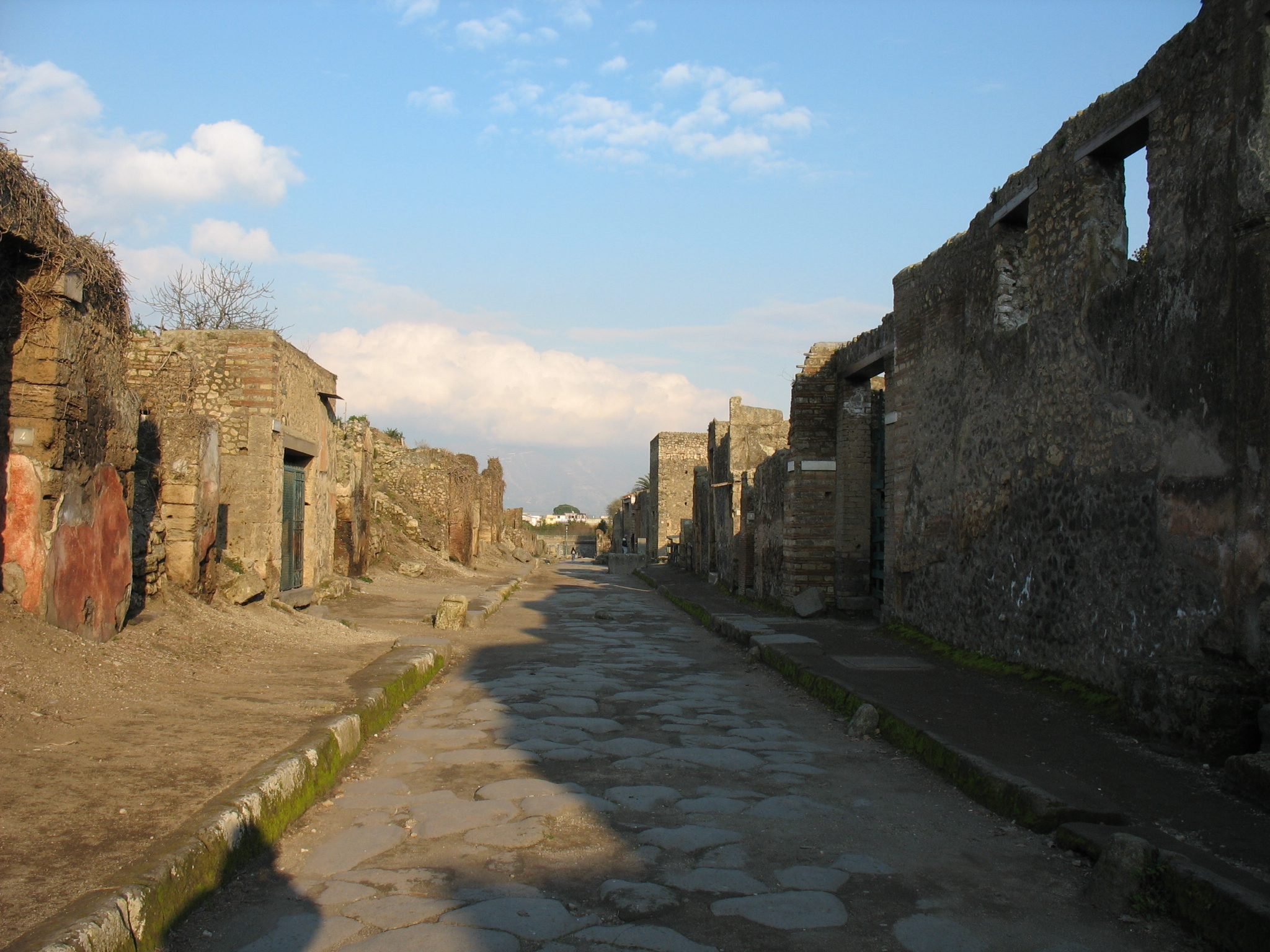
The buildings on the left show signs of decay due to the infestation of various plants, while the debris accumulating on the footpath indicates erosion of the infrastructure. The footpaths and road have also been worn down by pedestrian activity since excavation.

Objects buried beneath Pompeii were well-preserved for almost 2,000 years as the lack of air and moisture allowed little to no deterioration. However, Pompeii has been exposed to natural and anthropic deterioration following excavation.

Weathering, erosion, light exposure, water damage, poor methods of excavation and reconstruction, introduced plants and animals, tourism, vandalism and theft have all damaged the site in some way. The lack of adequate weather protection for all but the most interesting and important buildings has allowed original interior decoration to fade or be lost. Two-thirds of the city has been excavated, but the remnants of the city are rapidly deteriorating.

Furthermore, during World War II many buildings were badly damaged or destroyed by bombs dropped in several raids by the Allied forces.

The conservation concern has constantly worried archaeologists. The ancient city was included in the 1996 World Monuments Watch by the World Monuments Fund, and again in 1998 and in 2000. In 1996 the organisation claimed that Pompeii "desperately need[ed] repair" and called for the drafting of a general plan of restoration and interpretation. The organisation supported conservation at Pompeii with funding from American Express and the Samuel H. Kress Foundation.

The Schola Armatorum ('House of the Gladiators') collapsed in 2010 caused by heavy rainfall and lack of proper drainage. The structure was not open to visitors, but the outside was visible to tourists. There was fierce controversy after the collapse, with accusations of neglect.

Today, funding is mostly directed into conservation of the site; however, due to the expanse of Pompeii and the scale of the problems, this is inadequate in halting the slow decay of the materials. A 2012 study recommended an improved strategy for interpretation and presentation of the site as a cost-effective method of improving its conservation and preservation in the short term.

In June 2013, UNESCO warned that if restoration and preservation works "fail to deliver substantial progress in the next two years," Pompeii could be placed on the List of World Heritage in Danger. A "Grande Progetto Pompei" project of about five years had begun in 2012 with the European Union and included stabilization and conservation of buildings in the highest risk areas. In 2014, UNESCO headquarters received a new management plan to help integrate the property's management, conservation, and maintenance programs.

In 2020 many domus gardens, orchards and vineyards were carefully recreated using depictions in frescoes and archaeological finds to give better insights into what they were like before the catastrophe. These include the House of Julia Felix, the House of the Golden Cupids, the House of Loreius Tiburtinus, the House of Cornelius Rufus and the Garden of the Fugitives.

In 2021 several long-closed domus were re-opened after restoration including the House of the Ship Europa, House of the Orchard and House of the Lovers. Also the newly excavated House of Leda and the Swan has opened.

== Roman city development ==
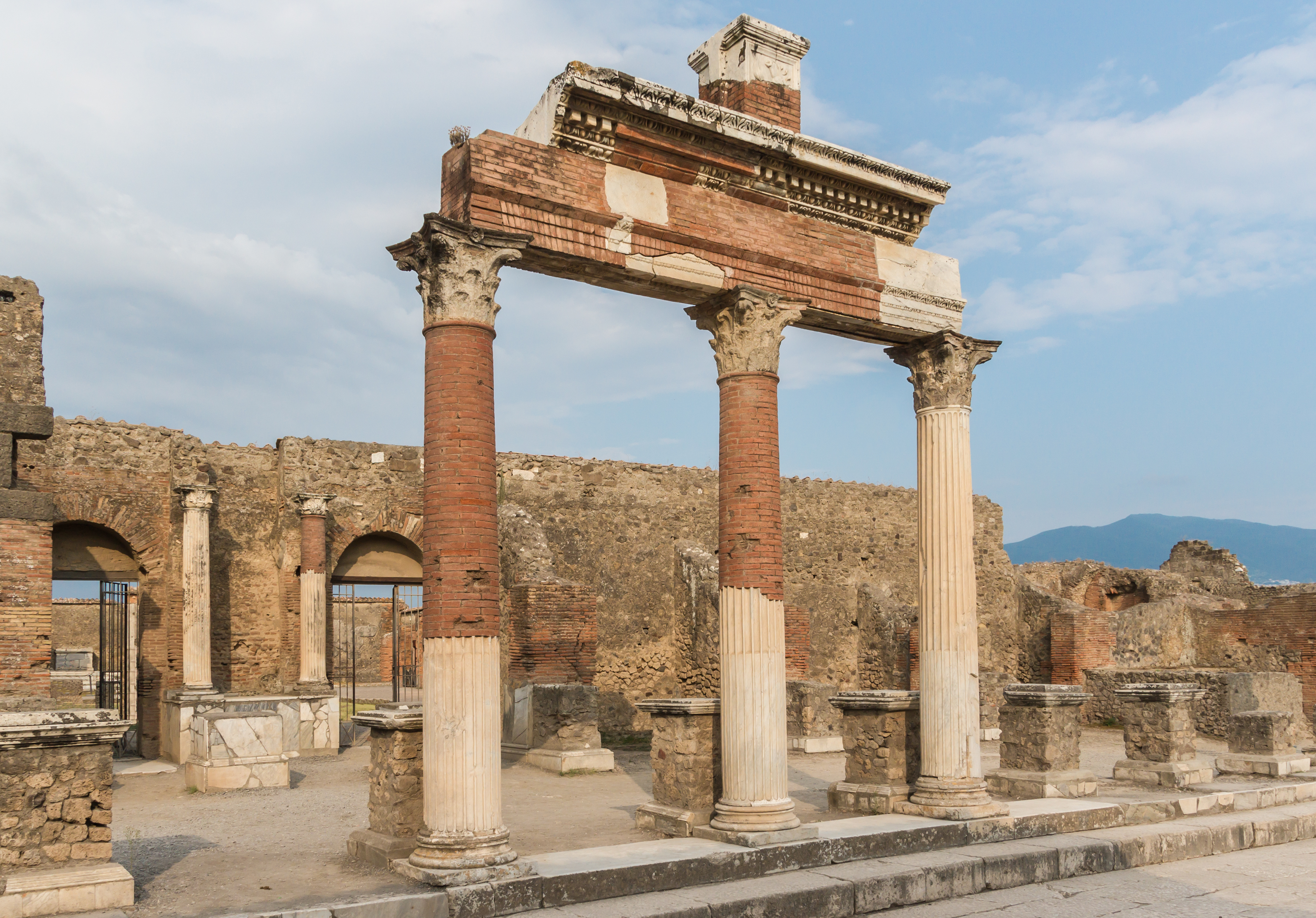
Portico in front of the entrance of the Macellum

Owing to its wealth and its Greek, Etruscan and Roman history, Pompeii is of great interest for the study of Ancient Roman architecture in terms of building methods and urban planning. However, it was a relatively small provincial city and, except for the Amphitheatre, it did not have large monuments on the scale of other Roman cities. It also missed the large building schemes of the early Empire and kept much of its urban architecture dating from as early as the 4th century BC.

The evolution of Pompeii's private and public buildings is often unclear because of the lack of excavations beneath the levels of 79. It is, however, clear that by the time of the conquest by Sulla in 89 BC, the development of the street layout was largely complete, and most of the insulae were built.

=== Public buildings ===
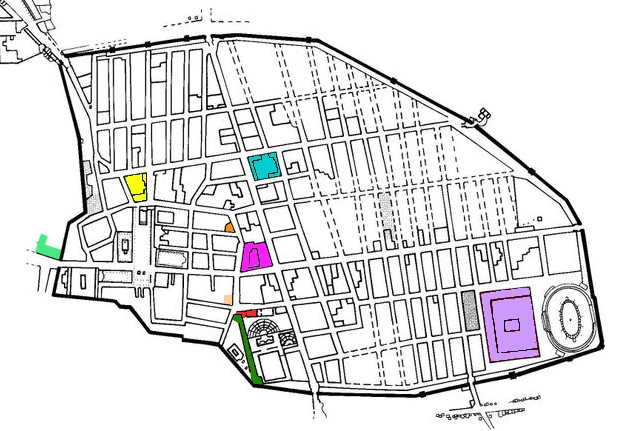
Location of public baths and sports buildings

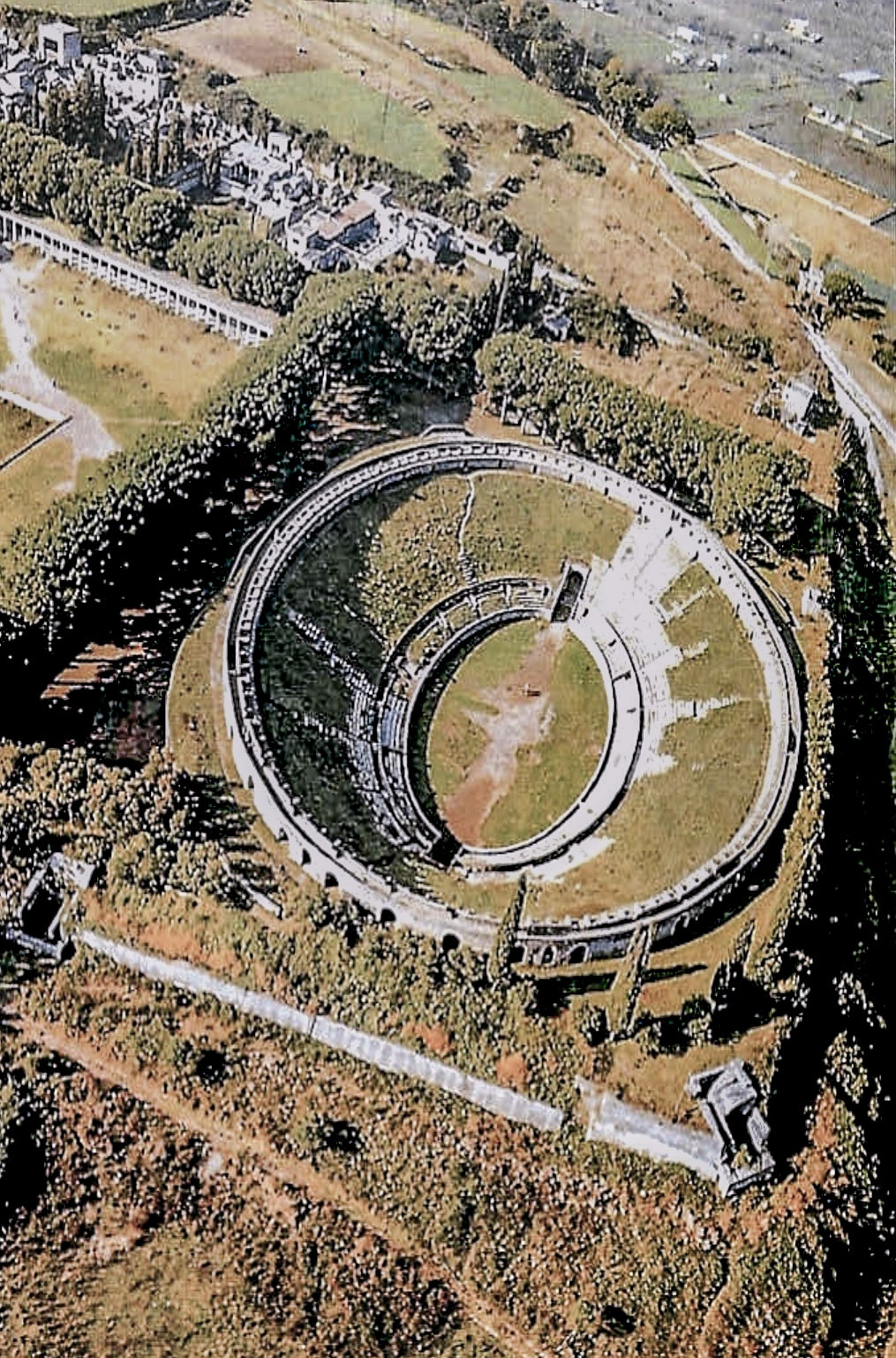
The Amphitheatre of Pompeii

Under the Romans, Pompeii underwent a process of urban development which accelerated in the Augustan period from about 30 BC. New public buildings included the Amphitheatre with palaestra or gymnasium with a central natatorium (cella natatoria) or swimming pool, two theatres, the Eumachia Building and at least four public baths. The amphitheatre has been cited by scholars as a model of sophisticated design, particularly in the area of crowd control.

Other service buildings were the Macellum ("meat market"); the Pistrinum (baker); the thermopolia (inns or snack-bars that served hot and cold dishes and drinks), and cauponae ("pubs" or "dives" with a seedy reputation as hangouts for thieves and prostitutes). At least one building, the Lupanar, was dedicated to prostitution. A large hotel or hospitium (of 1,000 m^{2}) was found nearby at Murecine/Moregine, when the Naples-Salerno motorway was being built, and the Murecine Silver Treasure and the Tablets (providing a unique record of business transactions), as well as the Moregine bracelet, were discovered there.

An aqueduct provided water to the public baths, to more than 25 street fountains, and to many private houses and businesses. The aqueduct was a branch of the great Serino Aqueduct built to serve the other large towns in the Bay of Naples region and the important naval base at Misenum. The castellum aquae is well preserved and includes many details of the distribution network and its controls.

=== Shops and workshops ===
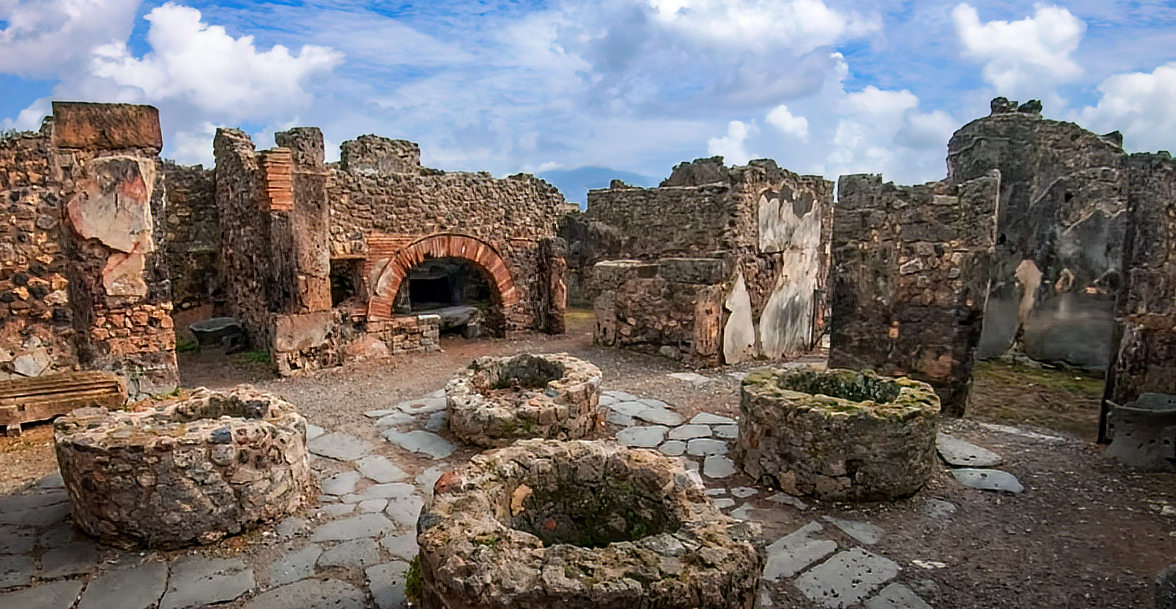
Bakery in Region VIII

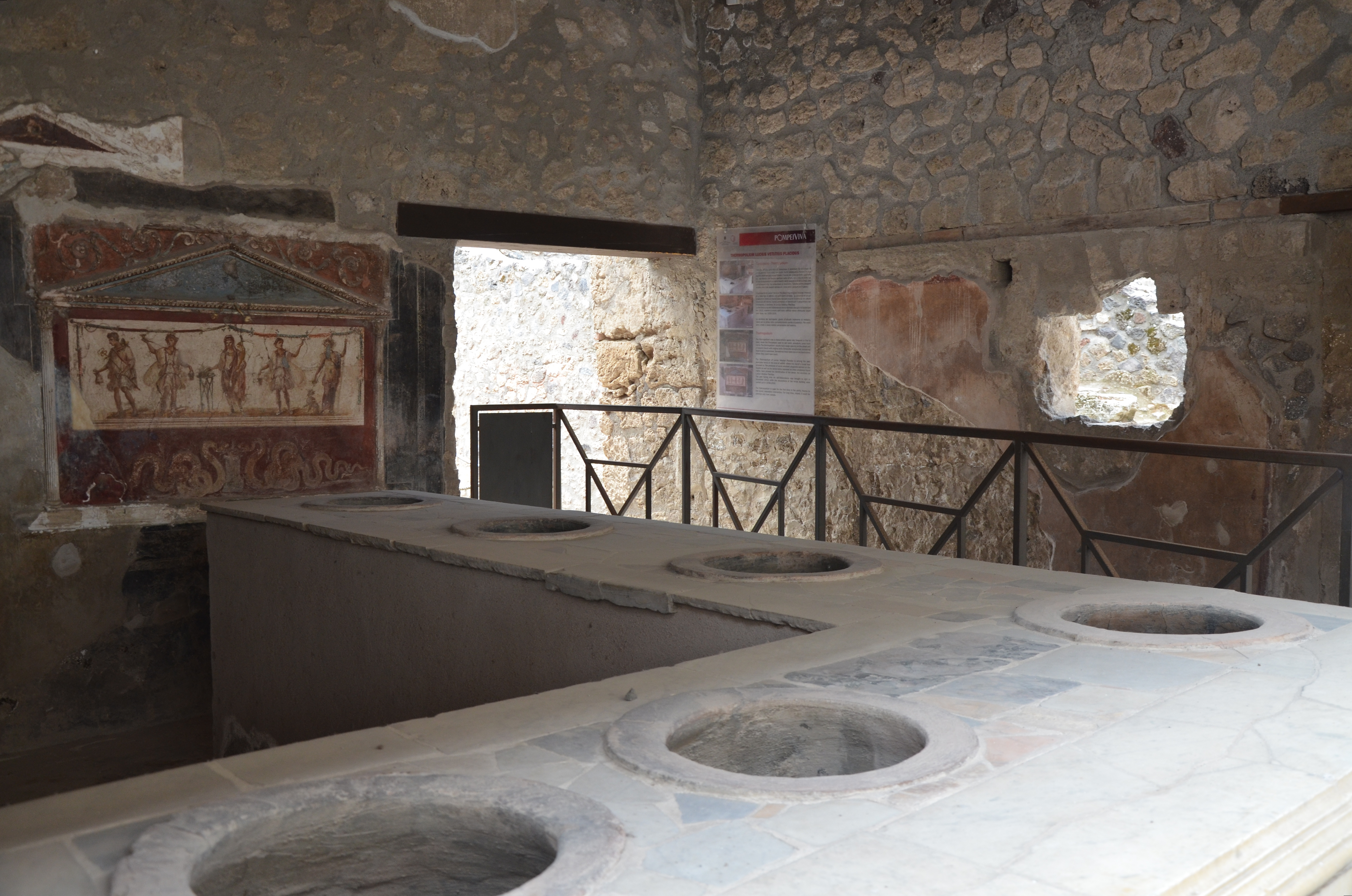
Thermopolium of Vetutius Placidus opening directly onto the Via dell'Abbondanza

There were at least 31 bakeries in the town, each with wood-burning ovens, millstones and a sales counter. The Modestus bakery, or House of the Oven, was the largest in the city and Sotericus's bakery, also among the largest, preserves the room for kneading bread.

Thermopolia were inns or snack-bars in which hot food and drinks were sold and in Pompeii there were nearly 100. The thermopolium of Vetutius Placidus overlooked the street directly, had a counter and several dolia, as well as a room behind the shop where customers could eat their meals: the lararium with frescoes of the Lares and Mercury and Dionysus and a triclinium decorated in the Third style. In the thermopolium of Asellina, with three sales counters and a lararium with depictions of Mercury and Bacchus, numerous furnishings have been found, both in bronze and terracotta, as well as 683 sesterces; the external façade bears a representation of jugs and funnels and an electoral inscription referring to Asellina, probably the owner of the inn.

Wool processing was well developed with 13 workshops that worked the raw material, seven that did the spinning, nine the dyeing, and 18 the washing: the Building of Eumachia, from the name of the priestess who built it, was the wool market, or the seat of the fullers guild; construction took place after 62 and was entirely in brickwork. Inside it has numerous niches in which statues were housed, mostly concerning the imperial family, a colonnade, and near the entrance, there was a jar in which urine was collected for use as a detergent for clothes. The fullonica of Stephanus, named after the owner or manager, was originally a house that was transformed into a workshop for the processing of fabrics: on the lower floor the working and washing activities took place, carried out in large tanks with water, soda and urine while on the upper floor the clothes were dried.

The garum workshop made the sauce obtained from the fermentation of the entrails of fish; in the building some containers were found, closed by lids, with the sauce inside while in the nearby garden was a large deposit of amphorae.

=== Lists of buildings ===
Public buildings
- Amphitheatre of Pompeii
- Eumachia building
- Macellum of Pompeii
- Suburban Baths
- Stabian Baths
- Temple of Apollo
- Temple of Isis
- Temple of Jupiter
- Theatre Area of Pompeii

Town houses (Domus)

- House of the Centenary
- House of the Faun
- House of Julia Felix
- House of the Greek Epigrams
- House of Lucius Caecilius Iucundus
- House of Loreius Tiburtinus
- House of Menander
- House of the Prince of Naples
- House of Sallust
- House of the Silver Wedding
- House of the Small Fountain (Pompeii)
- House of the Surgeon
- House of the Tragic Poet
- House of the Vettii

Exterior villas

- Villa of Diomedes
- Villa of the Mysteries

Other

- The Garden of the Fugitives
- Lupanar

=== Agriculture and horticulture ===
Modern archaeologists have excavated garden sites and urban domains to reveal the agricultural staples of Pompeii's economy. Pompeii had fertile soil for crop cultivation. The soils surrounding Mount Vesuvius preceding its eruption had good water-retention capabilities, implying productive agriculture. The Tyrrhenian Sea's airflow provided hydration to the soil despite the hot, dry climate. Barley, wheat, and millet were produced along with wine and olive oil, for export to other regions.

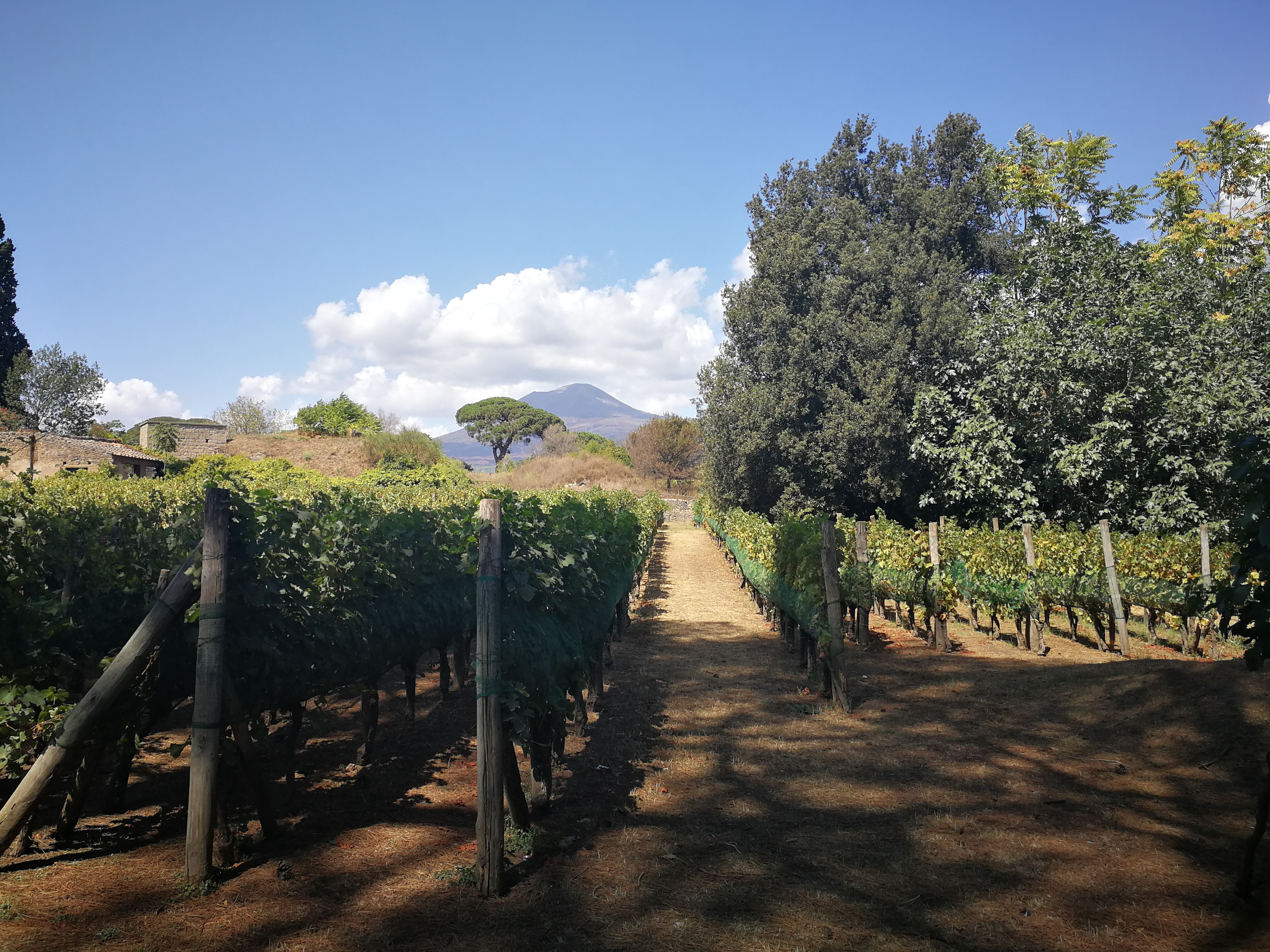
The 'Foro Boario' vineyard at Pompeii, replanted as it was at the time of the eruption

Evidence of wine imported nationally from Pompeii in its most prosperous years can be found from recovered artefacts such as wine bottles in Rome. For this reason, vineyards were of utmost importance to Pompeii's economy. Agricultural policymaker Columella suggested that each vineyard in Rome produce a quota of three cullei of wine per jugerum; otherwise, the vineyard would be uprooted. The nutrient-rich lands near Pompeii were extremely efficient and often capable of largely exceeding these requirements, providing the incentive for local wineries to establish themselves. While wine was exported for Pompeii's economy, most other agricultural goods were likely produced in quantities sufficient for the city's consumption.

Remains of large formations of constructed wineries were found in the Forum Boarium, covered by cemented casts from the eruption of Vesuvius. It is speculated that these historical vineyards are strikingly similar in structure to the modern day vineyards across Italy.

Carbonised food plant remains, roots, seeds and pollens have been found in gardens in Pompeii, Herculaneum, and a Roman villa at Torre Annunziata. They revealed that emmer wheat, Italian millet, common millet, walnuts, pine nuts, chestnuts, hazel nuts, chickpeas, bitter vetch, broad beans, olives, figs, pears, onions, garlic, peaches, carob, grapes, and dates were consumed. All but the dates could have been produced locally.

=== Erotic art ===
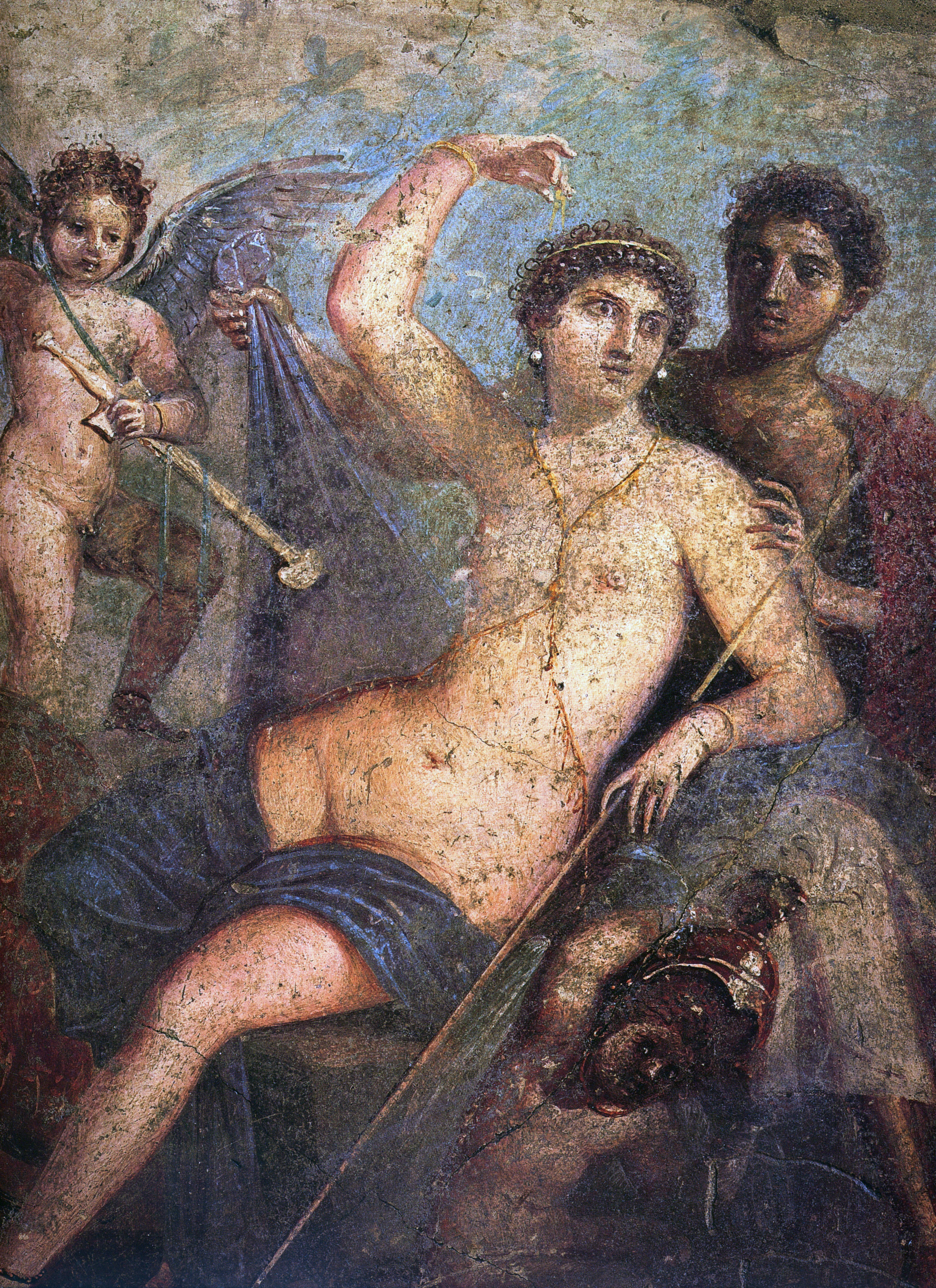
From the house of Mars and Venus

The discovery of erotic art in Pompeii and Herculaneum left the archaeologists with a dilemma stemming from the clash of cultures between the mores of sexuality in ancient Rome and in Counter-Reformation Europe. An unknown number of discoveries were hidden away again. A wall fresco depicting Priapus, the ancient god of sex and fertility, with his grotesquely enlarged penis, was covered with plaster. An older reproduction was locked away "out of prudishness" and opened only on request – and only rediscovered in 1998 due to rainfall. In 2018, an ancient fresco depicting an erotic scene of "Leda and the Swan" was discovered at Pompeii.

Many artefacts from the buried cities are preserved in the Naples National Archaeological Museum. In 1819, when King Francis visited the Pompeii exhibition there with his wife and daughter, he was so embarrassed by the erotic artwork that he had it locked away in a "secret cabinet" (gabinetto segreto), a gallery within the museum accessible only to "people of mature age and respected morals". Re-opened, closed, re-opened again and then closed again for nearly 100 years, the Naples "Secret Museum" was briefly made accessible again at the end of the 1960s (the time of the sexual revolution) and was finally re-opened for viewing in 2000. Minors are still allowed entry only in the presence of a guardian or with written permission.

== Tourism ==
Pompeii has been a popular tourist destination for over 250 years; it was on the Grand Tour. By 2008, it was attracting almost 2.6 million visitors per year, making it one of Italy's most popular tourist sites. It is part of a larger Vesuvius National Park and was declared a World Heritage Site by UNESCO in 1997. To combat problems associated with tourism, the governing body for Pompeii, the 'Soprintendenza Archeologica di Pompei', has begun issuing new tickets that allow tourists to visit cities such as Herculaneum and Stabiae as well as the Villa Poppaea, to encourage visitors to see these sites and reduce pressure on Pompeii. In 2024, the site's management announced that it would limit daily sales to a maximum of 20,000 personalised tickets per day and introduce timed entry schemes in the peak summer season.

Pompeii is a driving force behind the economy of the nearby town of Pompei. Many residents are employed in the tourism and hospitality industry, serving as taxi or bus drivers, waiters, or hotel staff.

New excavations at the site were generally ceased due to a moratorium imposed in 1999 by the superintendent of the site, Professor Pietro Giovanni Guzzo. The moratorium was lifted in 2017. The site is generally less accessible to tourists than in the past, with less than a third of all buildings open in the 1960s available for public viewing today.

=== Antiquarium of Pompeii ===
Originally built by Giuseppe Fiorelli between 1873 and 1874, the Antiquarium of Pompeii began as an exhibition venue displaying archaeological finds that represented the daily life of the ancient city. The building suffered extensive damage in 1943 during the World War II bombings and again in 1980 due to an earthquake. The museum was closed to the public for 36 years before reopening in 2016 as a space for temporary exhibitions. The museum was re-opened on 25 January 2021 as a permanent exhibition venue. Visitors can see archaeological discoveries from the excavations, casts of the victims of the Mount Vesuvius eruption as well as displays documenting Pompeii's settlement history before becoming a thriving Roman city.

== In popular culture ==
Karl Brullov, The Last Day of Pompeii (1830–1833)

The 1954 film Journey to Italy, starring George Sanders and Ingrid Bergman, includes a scene at Pompeii in which they witness the excavation of a cast of a couple who perished in the eruption.

Pompeii was the setting for the British comedy television series Up Pompeii! and the movie of the series. Pompeii also featured in the second episode of the fourth season of revived BBC science fiction series Doctor Who, named "The Fires of Pompeii", which featured Caecilius as a character.

The rock band Pink Floyd filmed a 1971 live concert, Pink Floyd: Live at Pompeii, in which they performed six songs in the city's ancient Roman amphitheatre. The audience consisted only of the film's production crew and some local children.

In their self-titled debut album, The B-52s made specific reference to both Pompeii and Herculaneum in their song Lava.

Siouxsie and the Banshees wrote and recorded the punk-inflected dance song "Cities in Dust", which describes the disaster that befell Pompeii and Herculaneum in AD 79. The song appears on their album 1985 Tinderbox. The jacket of the single remix of the song features the plaster cast of a chained dog killed in Pompeii.

Pompeii is a 2003 Robert Harris novel featuring an account of the aquarius's race to fix the broken aqueduct in the days before the eruption of Vesuvius. Actual events and people inspired the novel.

"Pompeii" is a 2013 song by the British band Bastille. The lyrics refer to the city and the eruption of Mount Vesuvius.

Pompeii is a 2014 German-Canadian historical disaster film produced and directed by Paul W. S. Anderson.

45 years after the Pink Floyd recordings, guitarist David Gilmour returned to the Pompeii amphitheatre in 2016 to perform a live concert for his Rattle That Lock Tour. This event was considered the first in the amphitheatre to feature an audience since the AD 79 eruption of Vesuvius.

== Documentaries ==
- In Search of...'s episode No. 82 focuses entirely on Pompeii; it premiered on 29 November 1979.
- The National Geographic special In the Shadow of Vesuvius (1987) explores the sites of Pompeii and Herculaneum, interviews (then) leading archaeologists, and examines the events leading up to the eruption of Vesuvius.
- Ancient Mysteries: Pompeii: Buried Alive (1996), an A&E television documentary narrated by Leonard Nimoy.
- Pompeii: The Last Day (2003), an hour-long drama produced for the BBC that portrays several characters (with historically attested names, but fictional life-stories) living in Pompeii, Herculaneum and around the Bay of Naples, and their last hours, including a fuller and his wife, two gladiators, and Pliny the Elder. It also portrays the facts of the eruption.
- Pompeii and the AD 79 eruption (2004), a two-hour Tokyo Broadcasting System documentary.
- Pompeii Live (28 June 2006), a Channel 5 production featuring a live archaeological dig at Pompeii and Herculaneum.
- Pompeii: The Mystery of the People Frozen in Time (2013), a BBC One drama documentary presented by Margaret Mountford.
- The Riddle of Pompeii (23 May 2014), Discovery Channel.
- Pompeii: The Dead Speak (8 August 2016), Smithsonian Channel.
- Pompeii's People (3 September 2017), a CBC Gem documentary presented by David Suzuki.

== Gallery ==
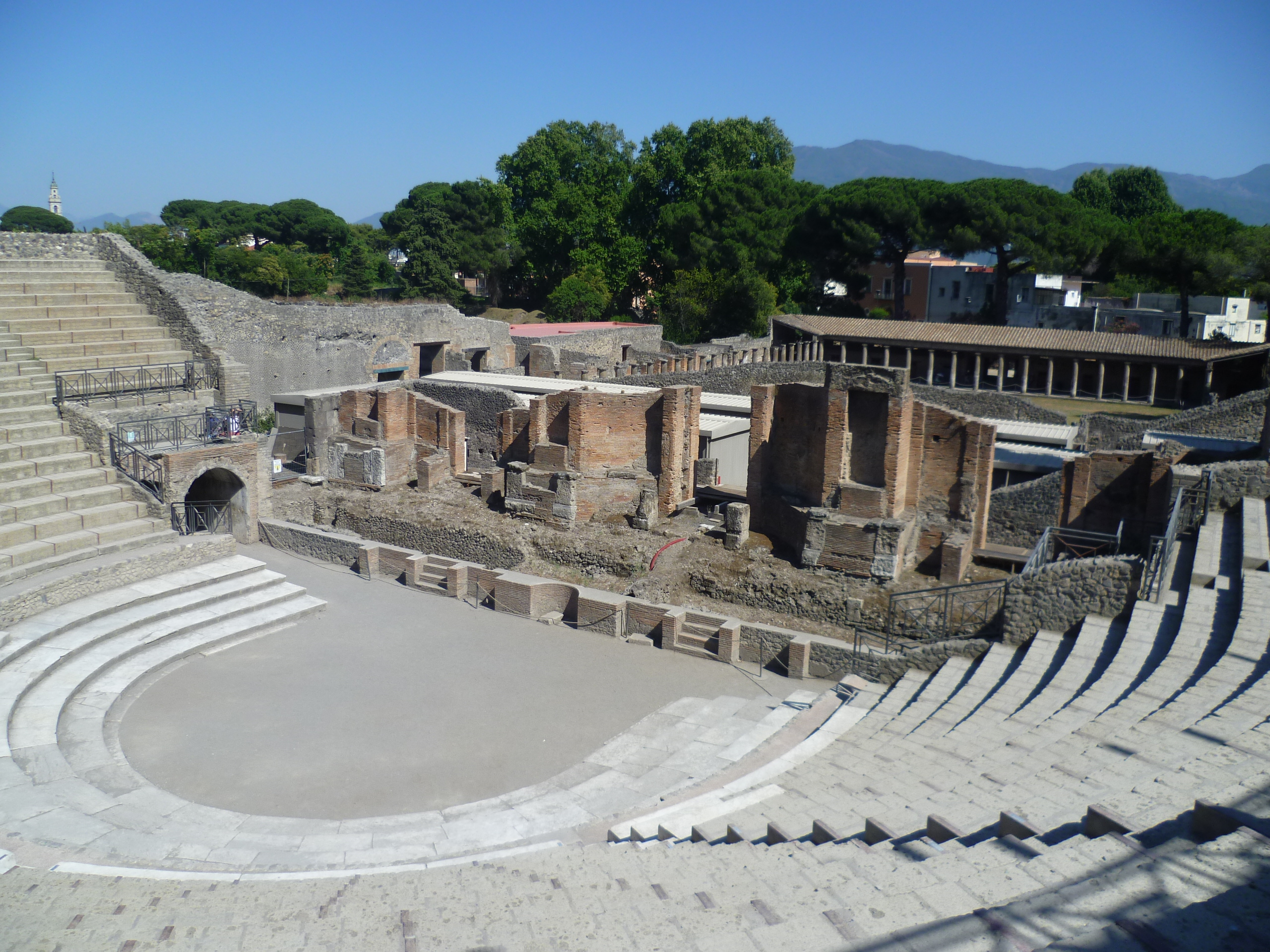
The Theatre

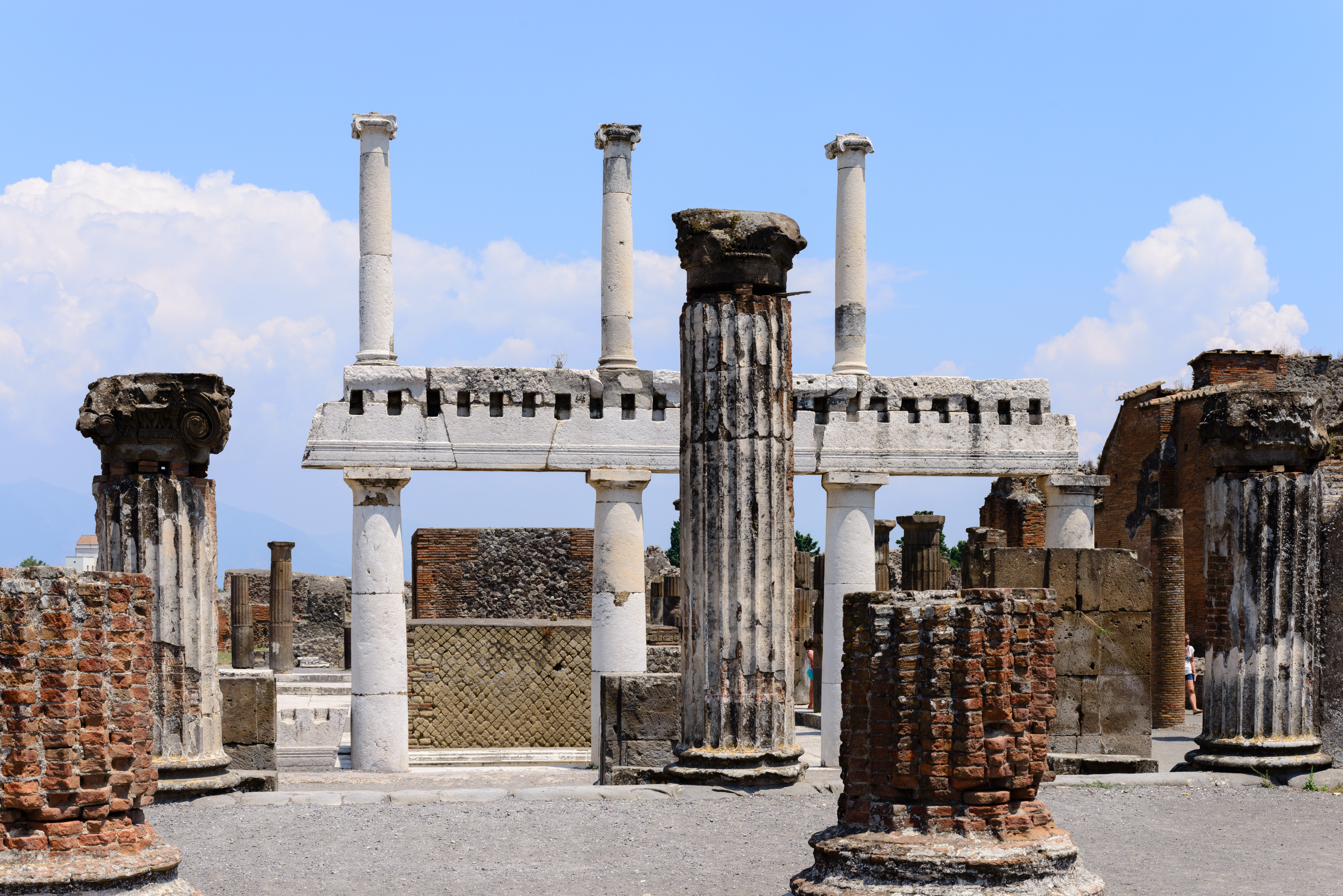
Entrance to the Basilica in the Forum

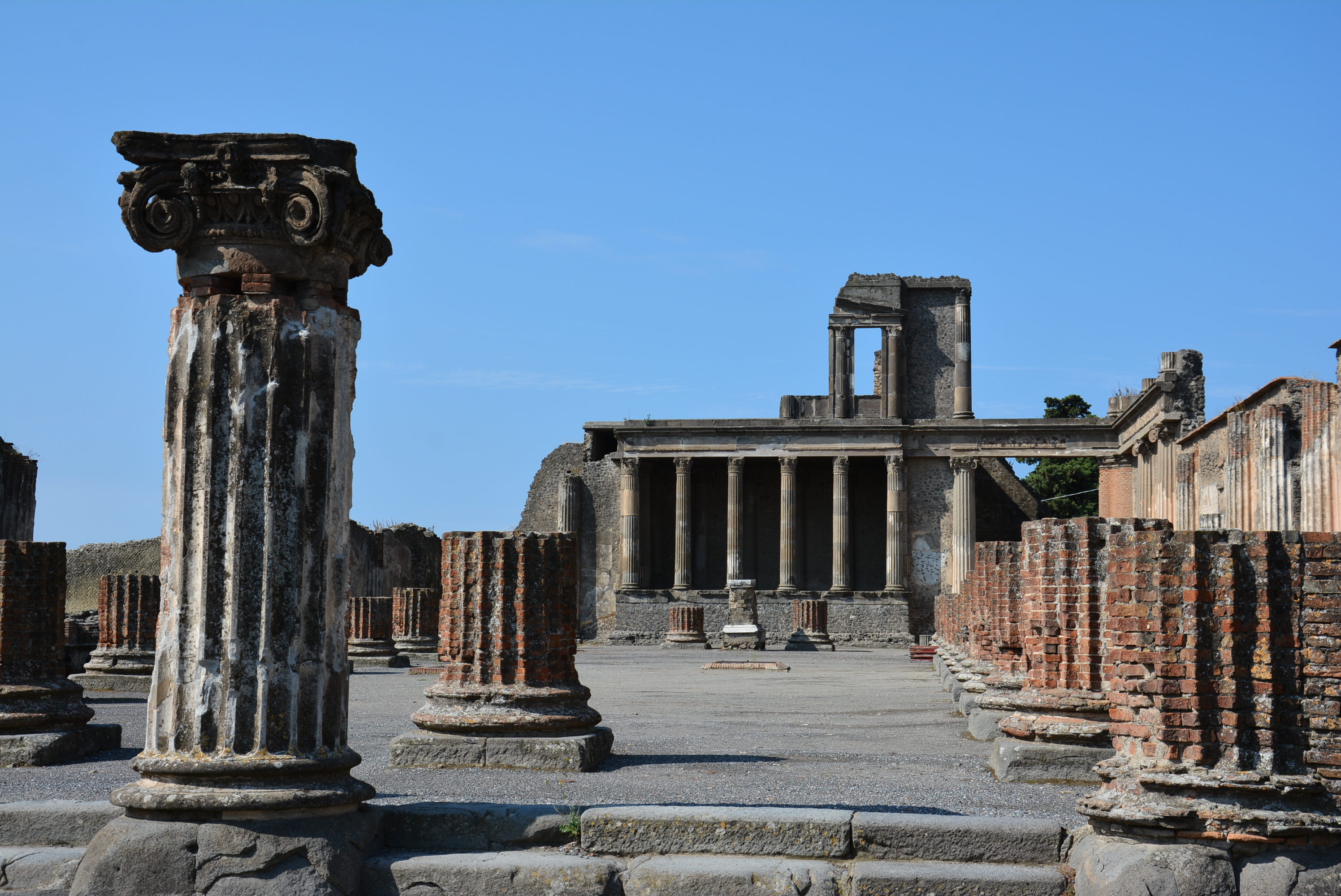
The Basilica

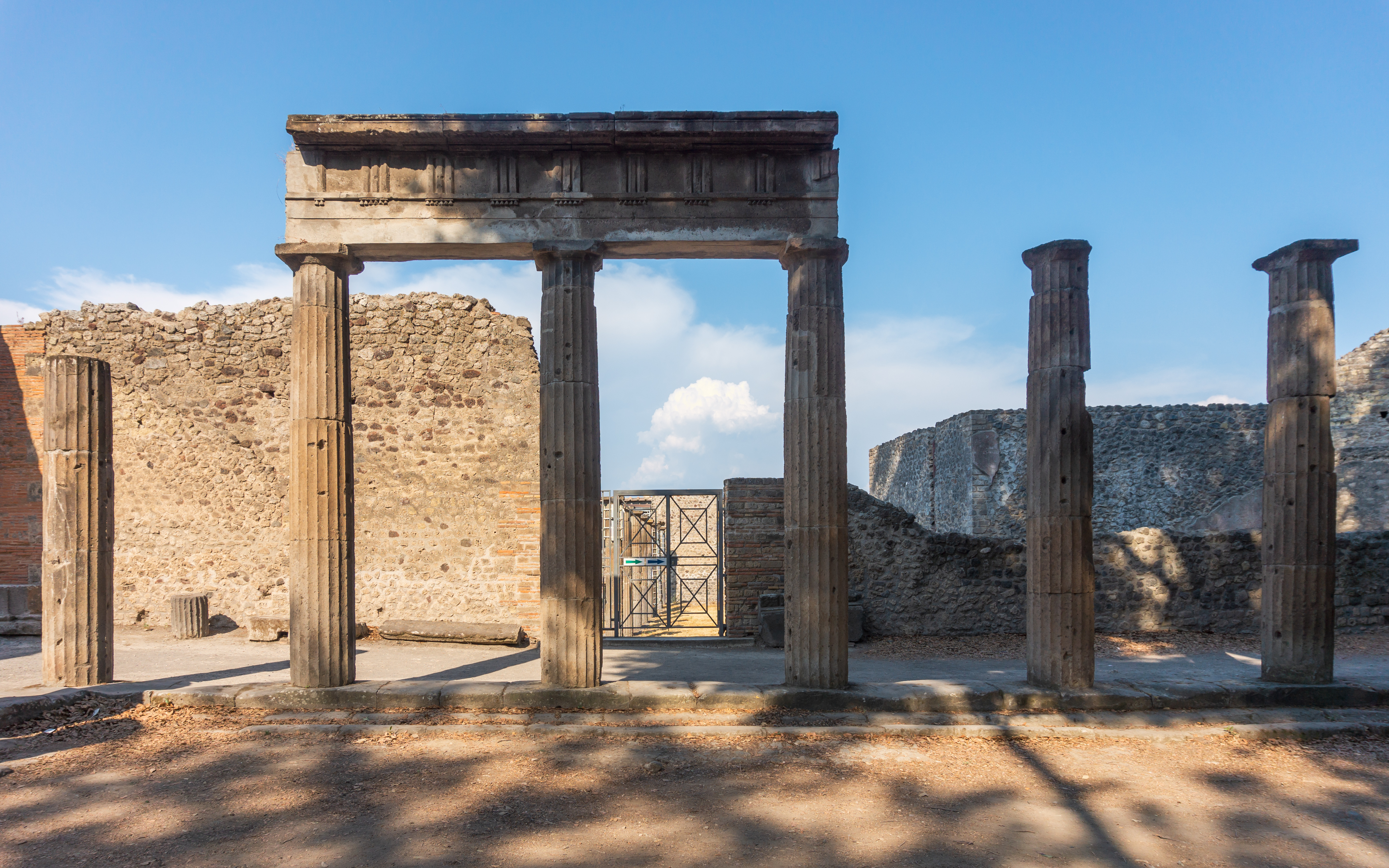
The Triangular Forum

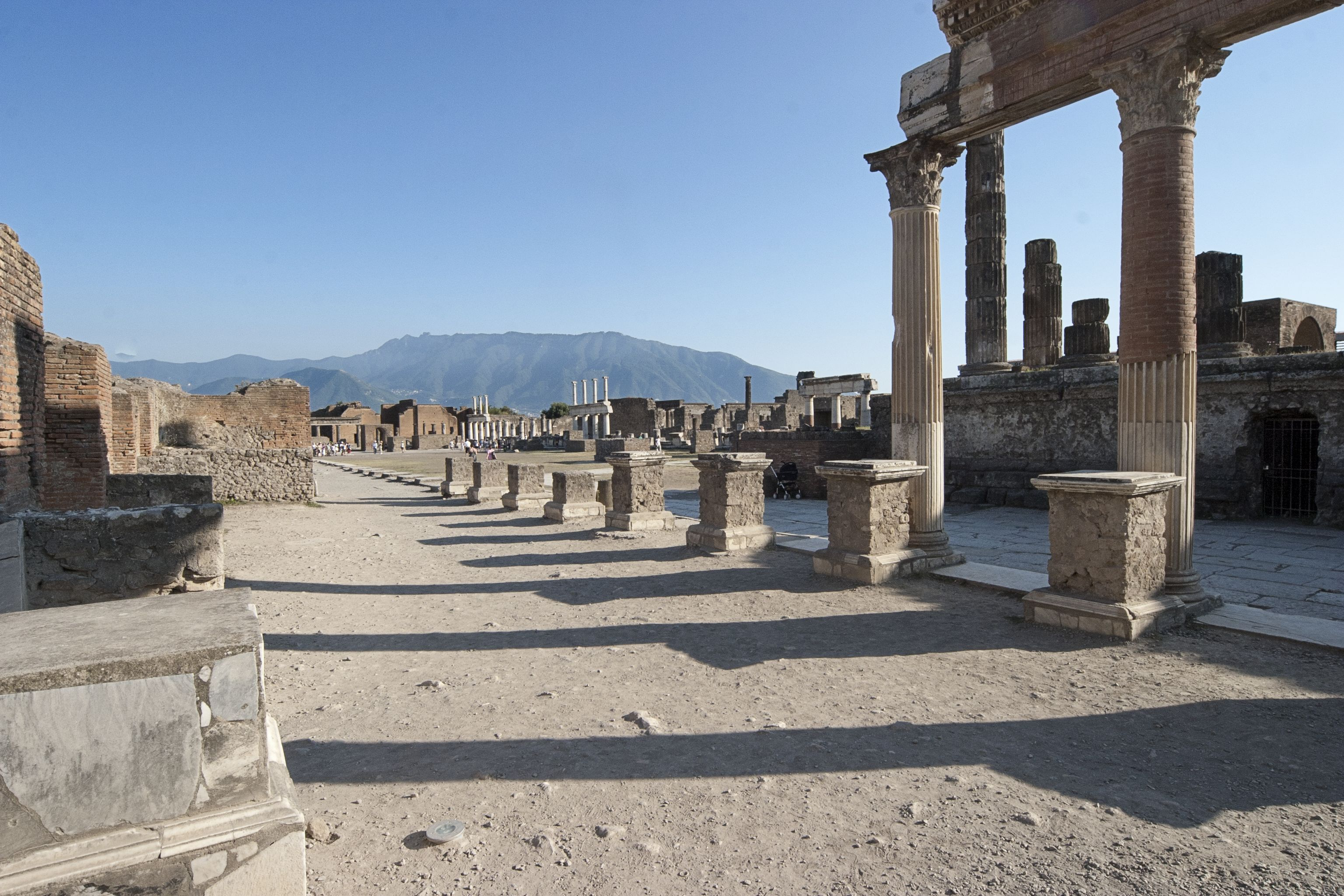
The Forum

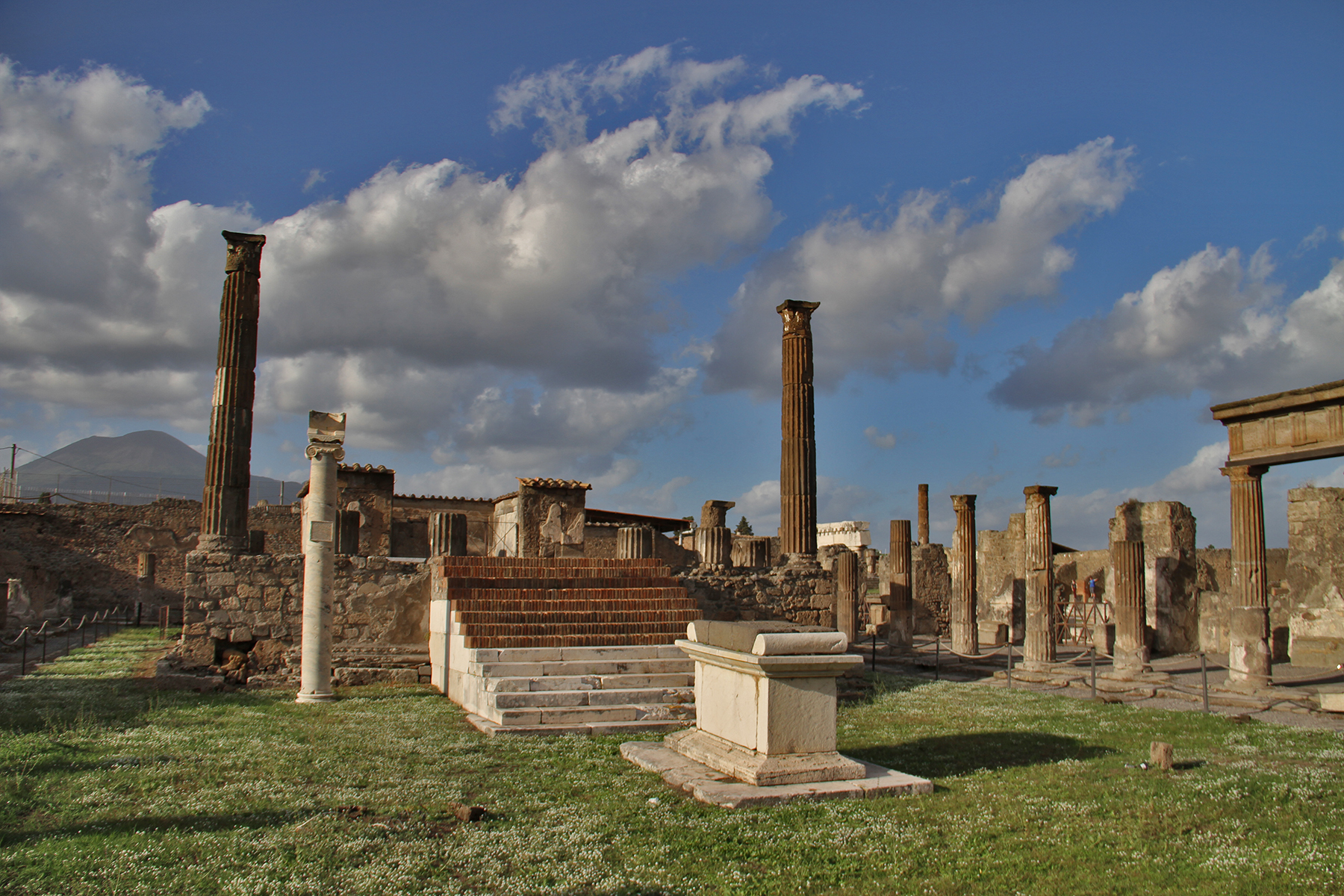
The Temple of Apollo

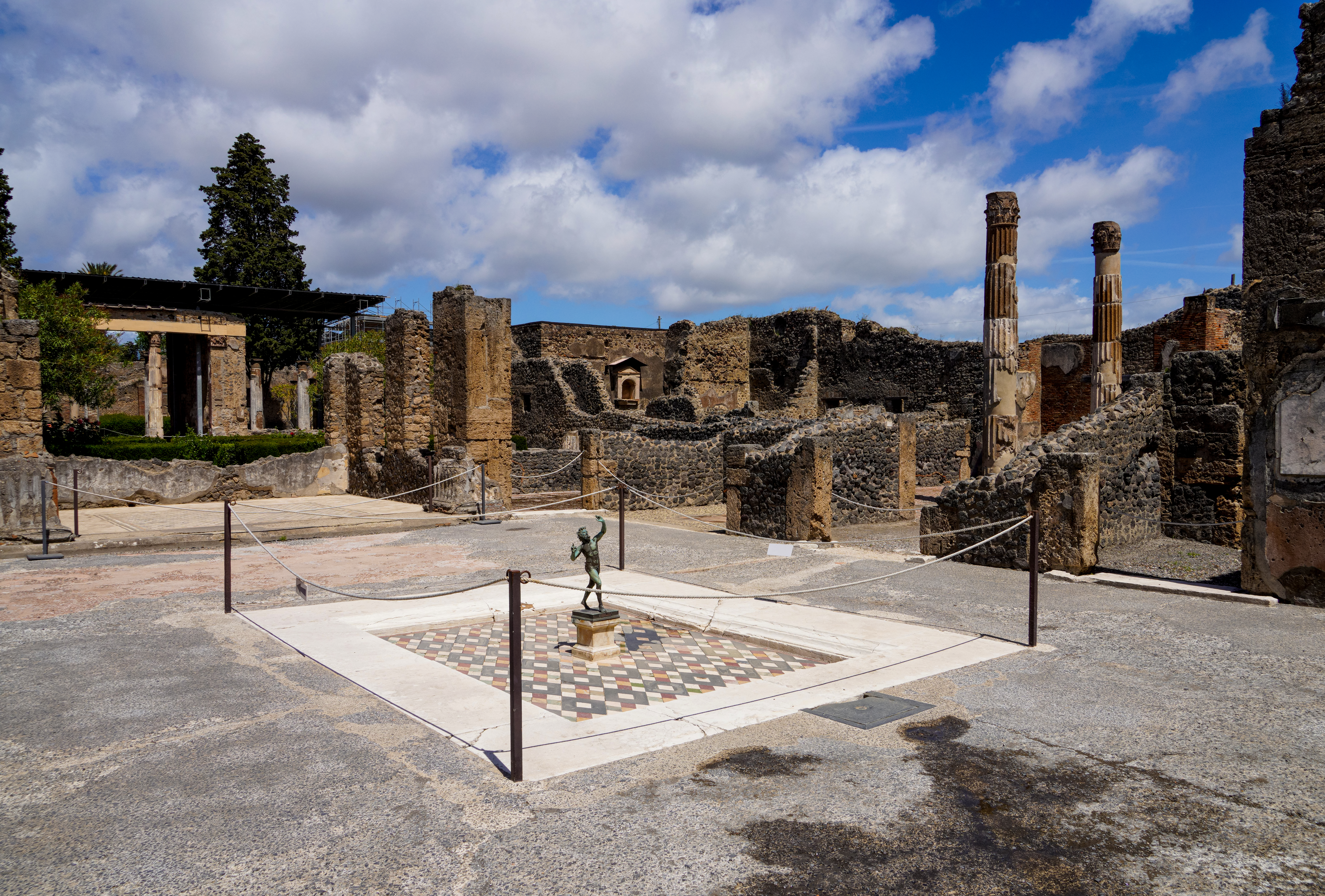
The House of the Faun

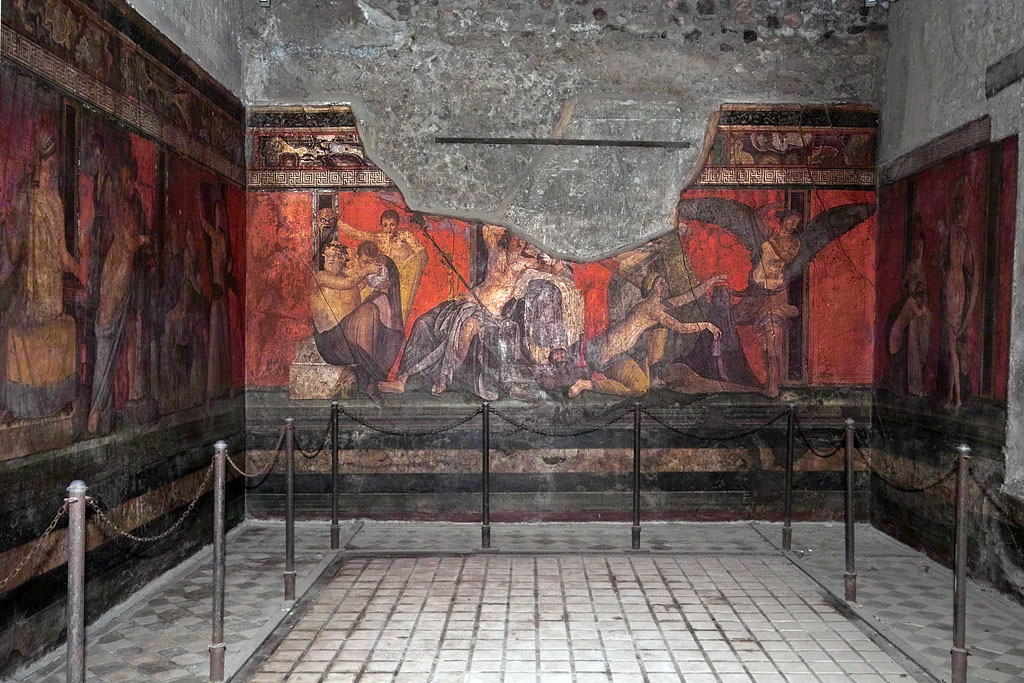
Fresco from the Villa dei Misteri

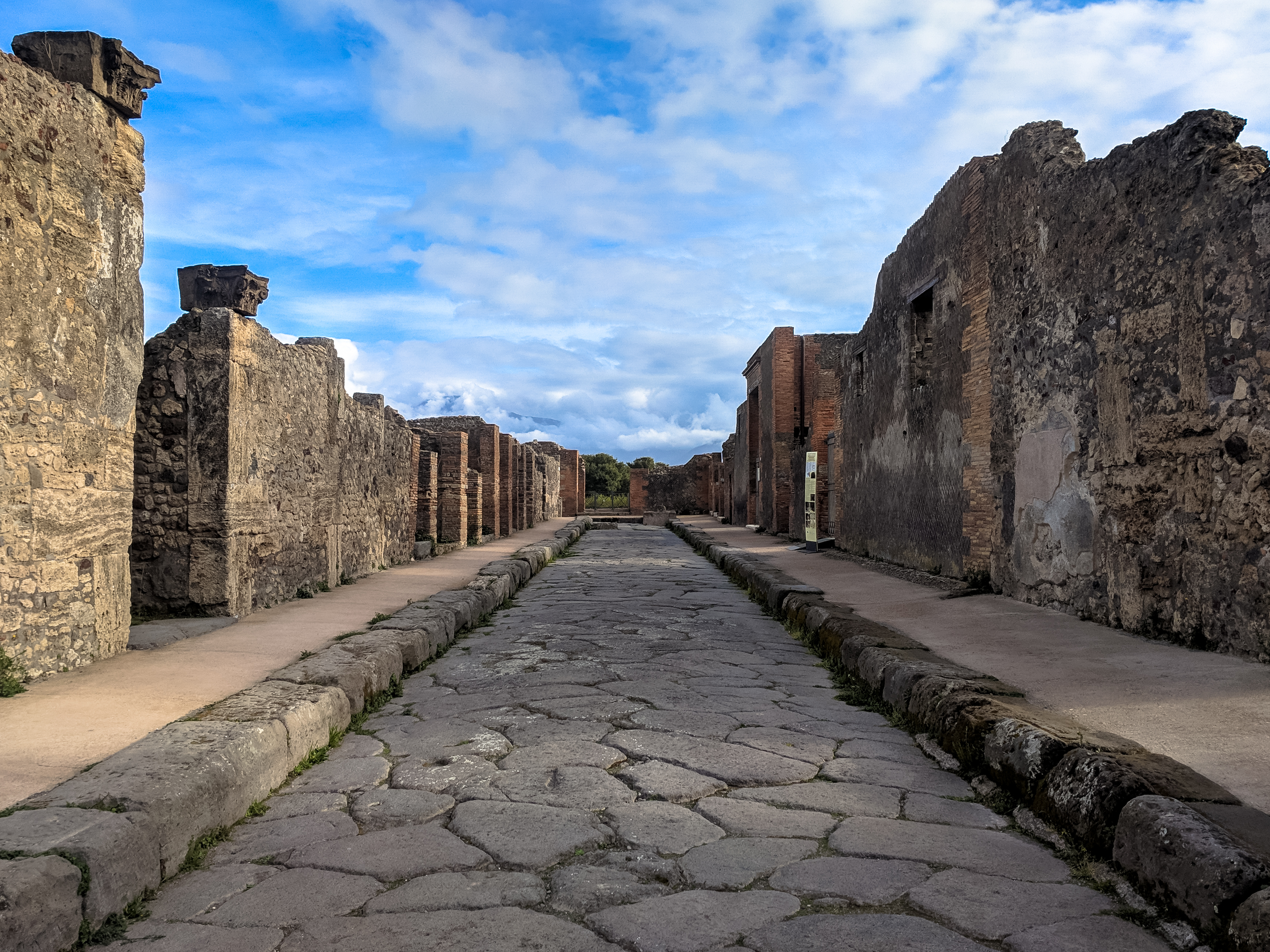
Street in Pompeii

== See also ==
- Foreign influences on Pompeii
- List of World Heritage Sites in Italy
- Mastroberardino, a project with the Italian winery Mastroberardino to replant the vineyards of Pompeii
- Robert Rive, 1850s photographer of Pompeii
- Luigi Bazzani: Watercolours of Pompeii when first excavated

Volcanic destruction

- Armero tragedy, a city in Colombia that suffered a similar fate in 1985
- Akrotiri, in Santorini, Greece, excavated ruins of a city that suffered a similar fate to Pompeii more than 3000 years ago
- Joya de Cerén, a pre-Columbian farming village in El Salvador known as the "Pompeii of the Americas"
- Plymouth, Montserrat, former capital city buried by volcanic ash from the Soufrière Hills volcano in the 1990s
- Saint-Pierre, Martinique, town similarly destroyed by the volcanic eruption of Mount Pelee, in 1902
