= Memor (disambiguation) =

Memor (died c. 262) was a usurper against the Roman Emperor Gallienus.

Memor or MEMOR may also refer to:

- Euchontha memor, a moth of the family Notodontidae
- Lucius Marcius Memor, a Roman haruspex
- MEMOR, a rail safety system used in Belgium in conjunction with Répétition des Signaux, see Belgian railway signalling
- Memor II+, a train protection system used in Luxembourg
- Memor was the Italian name of Transformers character Soundwave
