= Minimus (disambiguation) =

Minimus may refer to:

- Minimus, a Latin textbook series for children
- Minimus, a character from the television series Atomic Betty
- Minimus, a character from the 1945 novel Animal Farm

== See also ==
- Lord Minimus, a court dwarf of the English queen Henrietta Maria of France
