= Euchontha carboniptera =

Scientific classification
- Kingdom: Animalia
- Phylum: Arthropoda
- Clade: Pancrustacea
- Class: Insecta
- Order: Lepidoptera
- Superfamily: Noctuoidea
- Family: Notodontidae
- Genus: Euchontha
- Species: E. carboniptera

Binomial name
- Euchontha carboniptera Miller, 2008

Species of moth

Euchontha carboniptera is a moth of the family Notodontidae first described by James S. Miller in 2008. It is endemic to the eastern slopes of the Peruvian Andes.

The length of the forewings is 13–14 mm for males.
