= Euchontha ciris =

Scientific classification
- Kingdom: Animalia
- Phylum: Arthropoda
- Clade: Pancrustacea
- Class: Insecta
- Order: Lepidoptera
- Superfamily: Noctuoidea
- Family: Notodontidae
- Genus: Euchontha
- Species: E. ciris

Binomial name
- Euchontha ciris H. Druce, 1893

Synonyms
- Monocreaga circis Dognin, 1894; Monocreaga clareta Dognin, 1894

Species of moth

Euchontha ciris is a moth of the family Notodontidae first described by Herbert Druce in 1893. It is endemic to Ecuador.
