= Gaius Salvius Liberalis =

1st-century Roman senator, general and consul

Gaius Salvius Liberalis Nonius Bassus (fl. 80s CE) was a Roman senator and general, who held civil office in Britain and was a member of the Arval Brethren. He was suffect consul in the last nundinium of 85, with Cornelius Orestes as his colleague.

== Life ==
Gaius Salvius Liberalis is known to have come from Urbs Salvia in Picenum. According to Ronald Syme, he may have been first cousin to the consul Lucius Flavius Silva Nonius Bassus. However, Olli Salomies provides some evidence against this, most notably an inscription that indicates his mother's name was Ann[ia(?)]. An inscription recovered from Urbs Salvia supplies his father's praenomen, Gaius; more importantly it provides details of his cursus honorum.

The first office listed is the record of holding the chief magistracy of his home town in four census years; Anthony Birley explains this would extend 15 years from the first to the last tenure of this office. Next was his adlection into the Roman Senate as an ex-praetor, although another line of the inscription states he was adlected as an ex-tribune; from this, and in analogy of the career of Gaius Caristanius Fronto, Birley deduces Salvius Liberalis "probably also held equestrian military appointments and had been on the right side in the year 69."

He was co-opted into the Arval Brethren 1 March 78, replacing the deceased Gaius Salonius Matidius Patruinus; however, Salvius Liberalis was absent from the Arval ceremonies, returning by 30 October 81. Syme dates his tenure as juridicius Augustorum in Britain to 78–81, while H. Peterson argues that Salvius was commander of the Legio V Macedonica from May 78 to 24 June 79 or slightly later, becoming juridicius between those dates. Birley proposes yet a third chronology, dating his command of V Macedonica prior to his co-option into the Arval Brethren, in which case "if the priesthood was in some sense a reward for meritorious service as a legionary legate, it would be intelligible that it should be mentioned after it." Salvius Liberalis would then have held command of V Macedonica from 74 to 78, and served as juridicius from 78 to 81.

Afterwards Salvius Liberalis was proconsul of Macedonia. Syme argues, based on his absence again from the rituals of the Arval Brethren, he was proconsul in 84/85. In contrast, Paul Leunissen suggests instead a slightly earlier proconsular tenure, 82/83. Birley also dates the proconsulship to 82/83.

He returned to Rome accept appointment as suffect consul. Syme argues that in the aftermath of the trial of Gaius Caecilius Classicus, Salvius Liberalis was sent into exile. Birley notes he was "an outstanding advocate, fluent and forcible, whether prosecuting or for the defence" then notes, "His outspokenness won Vespasian's approval, but under Domitian he was in trouble, perhaps exile."

He returned at a later date, probably after the assassination of Domitian, Salvius Liberalis returned to Rome where he served as a lawyer. In 100, he was advocate for the defense of a proconsul of Africa prosecuted by Agricola. He is recorded as present for the meetings of the Arval Brotherhood in 101, but is missing from their Acta for 105, and it is likely he died between those years.

== Family ==
A gravestone found near Rome dedicated to his wife, Vitellia C.f. Rufilla, by his son, Gaius Salvius Vitellanius, provides details of his family. Salvius Vitellanius is known to have been a military tribune in Legio V Macedonica and legate to the proconsul of Macedonia; Birley suspects in both cases he served under his father.

== In fiction ==
Gaius Salvius Liberalis appears in books II-V of the Cambridge Latin Course as a conniving and evil man. He sentences many slaves to death, is disliked by most people and the main antagonist, who helps the emperor coordinate the downfall of many people. He is involved in a conspiracy against Tiberius Claudius Cogidubnus and unravels the affair between Paris and the emperor's wife, Domitia. Eventually, he is tried for his crimes and exiled for five years.

Political offices
Preceded by Decimus Aburius Bassus, and Quintus Julius Balbus as Suffect consuls	Suffect consul of the Roman Empire; 85 with Cornelius Orestes	Succeeded by Domitian XII, and Servius Cornelius Dolabella Petronianus as Ordinary consuls
