= Euchontha =

Scientific classification
- Kingdom: Animalia
- Phylum: Arthropoda
- Clade: Pancrustacea
- Class: Insecta
- Order: Lepidoptera
- Superfamily: Noctuoidea
- Family: Notodontidae
- Tribe: Dioptini
- Genus: Euchontha; Walker, 1865

Genus of moths

Euchontha is a genus of moths of the family Notodontidae. It consists of the following species:

- Euchontha anomala (Prout, 1918)
- Euchontha carboniptera Miller, 2008
- Euchontha castrona Warren, 1906
- Euchontha ciris Druce, 1893
- Euchontha commixta Warren, 1904
- Euchontha frigida (Walker, 1864)
- Euchontha memor Warren, 1904
- Euchontha moyobamba Miller, 1989
