= Cambridge Latin Course =

Series of textbooks published by Cambridge University Press

- North American Cambridge Latin Course Unit 1 (Fifth Edition)
- Language: English
- Publisher: Cambridge University Press
- Publication place: United Kingdom
- Website: https://www.na.cambridgescp.com/

The Cambridge Latin Course (CLC) is a series of textbooks published by Cambridge University Press, used to teach Latin to secondary school pupils. It provides a grounding in vocabulary, grammar and sense which allows progression through Common Entrance exams into a Secondary, or, Public School. First published in 1970, as of 2026 the series is in its fifth edition in the UK and sixth in North America. It has reached high status in the United Kingdom, being the most-used Latin course in the country for secondary school pupils, and being used by 85% of Latin-teaching schools.

== Format ==
The course consists of a series of chapters, each of which includes stories and dialogues in Latin as well as vocabulary and grammar explained in English. There is a short history section at the end of each chapter to provide context on Ancient Rome.

The first story "Cerberus" begins:

Caecilius est in hortō. Caecilius in hortō sedet. servus est in atriō. servus in atriō labōrat.

which means, in English:

Caecilius is in the garden. Caecilius is sitting in the garden. The slave is in the atrium. The slave is working in the atrium.

== Publication history ==
As of 2026, five editions of the course have been published in the UK and internationally, and six in North America.

The first UK edition was published between 1970 and 1974. The second edition was published in the early 1980s and the revisions included separate North American editions.

The fifth international edition, released in July 2022, made significant modifications and additions to the lessons in order to expand the perspectives shown of Roman life, with more representation of women and people of colour as well as a re-examination of slavery in the Roman world, and incorporate updated scholarship. The Cambridge Schools Classics Project described these as the "most significant new editions in its 50-year history".

== Plot ==
=== Book I (published 1970) ===
The book tells the adventures of Caecilius, a banker, and Metella, his wife, in Pompeii from the reign of Tiberius to that of Vespasian. Sometimes the book deviates to talk about Caecilius' two slaves, their cook Grumio, and Clemens, and their frequent humorous mishaps. The book also discusses Metella's slave, Melissa. The book ends when Mount Vesuvius erupts, and Caecilius, Cerberus, Melissa, and Metella are killed in Pompeii. However, the book leaves the reader wondering whether Caecilius' son, Quintus, survives, as he indeed does, along with the slave, Clemens, and (in the fifth edition) Lucia. The fate of Grumio, the cook, is left ambiguous. The beginning of the book is very simple, but each stage develops more complicated grammar and vocabulary. This book introduces the nominative, dative, and accusative cases and different verb tenses including the present, perfect and imperfect. In the later stages the superlative and comparative adjectival endings are included.

=== Book II (published 1971) ===
The second book is set in Roman Britain near Fishbourne Roman Palace under Agricola, where Quintus meets Salvius and King Cogidubnus, who are historical figures. The book starts by introducing a new family, a Roman aristocrat, Salvius, who is a successful lawyer and senator in Rome. His family includes his wife, Rufilla, and many slaves, some of whom are Britons, others foreign. In the second half of the book, Quintus tells King Cogidubnus about his journey to Alexandria, where he met Barbillus, a friend of his father. Barbillus later dies of a wound during a hunting trip, and tells Quintus to find his son Rufus, who lives in Britain, thus explaining the reason for Quintus' visit.

=== Book III (published 1971) ===
The third book picks up in the Roman province of Britain, in the city of Aquae Sulis (Bath) in particular. Cogidubnus falls ill and goes to the baths at Aquae Sulis, and Salvius, seeing his chance, hatches a plot with the baths' owner, Lucius Marcius Memor, to kill him. Quintus foils the plan, much to Salvius' dismay. He also finds Barbillus' son Rufus and gives him a message. When Cogidubnus eventually dies in captivity, Salvius writes a false will for him. A continuous narrative throughout the book also includes Modestus and Strythio, two bumbling Romans in the military.

=== Book IV (published 1971) ===
In the fourth textbook, the setting moves to Rome, a few years after the events in Britain. Quintus is absent, and the main characters are Salvius, his ally Haterius, and several other Roman aristocrats, as well as some ordinary citizens. Salvius coordinates the death of Paris, a famous pantomime actor, and exiles Domitia, the emperor's wife, whose affair with Paris was exposed.

=== Book V (first published 1971) ===
The book is set in Rome, after Agricola has successfully conquered Scotland. Various acquaintances of the emperor, including Glabrio, an advisor to the emperor, are introduced, as well as the emperor himself. Glabrio accuses Salvius of the forgery of Cogidubnus' will, while Domitia accuses him of plotting her exile. Quintus is present at Salvius' trial. Salvius is convicted and sentenced to five years of exile. In the remaining chapters, the writings of several poets (particularly Martial and Ovid) and historical figures replace the narrative.

In the upcoming Fifth Edition, Books IV and Book V will be combined into a single Book IV.

=== American editions ===
To suit the American format, books III and IV were combined.

== Recurring characters ==
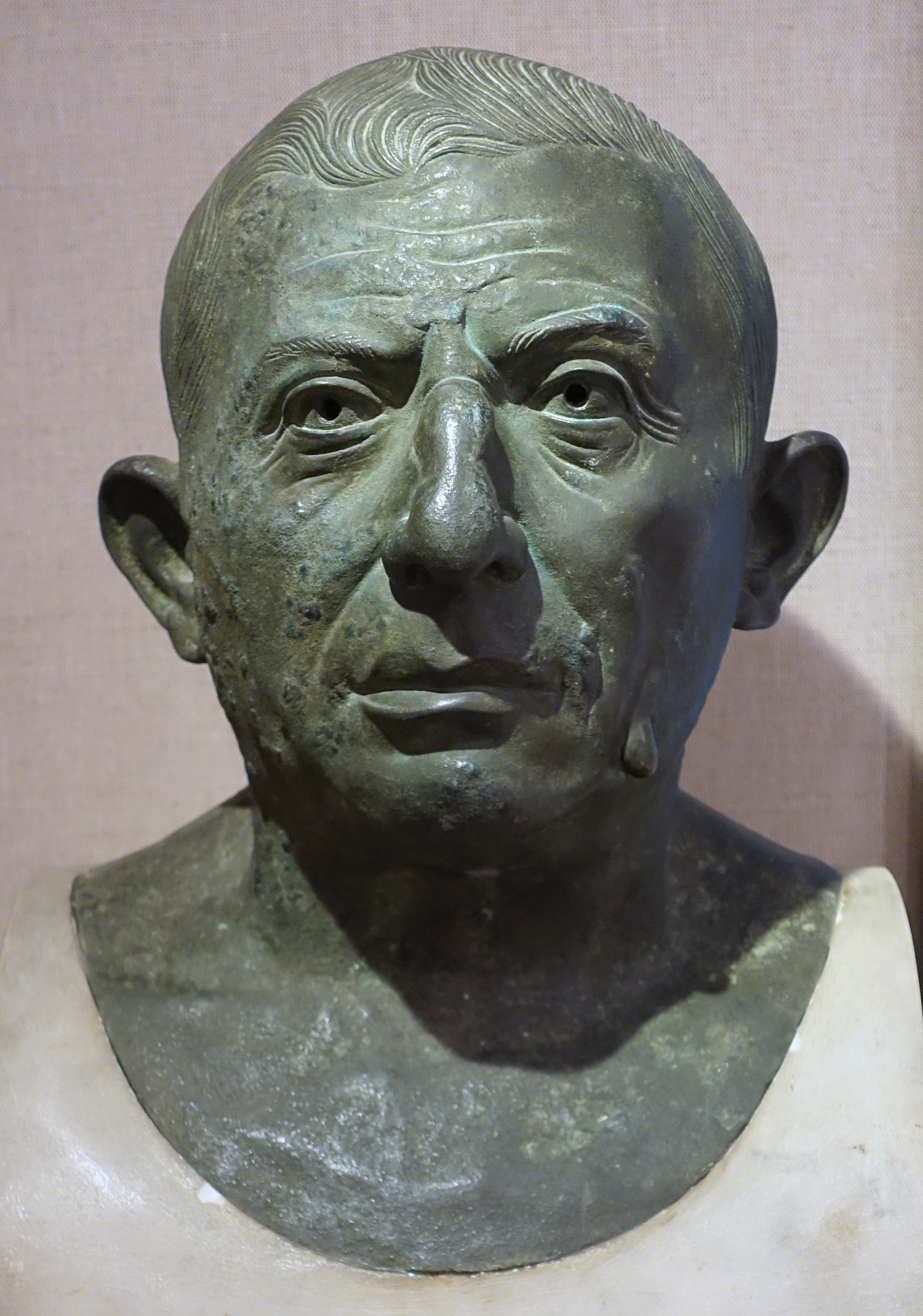
Bust of L. Caecilius Iucundus

=== Main characters ===
- Lucius Caecilius Iucundus

Caecilius is the protagonist of the first book. He is a banker who lives in Pompeii. When Mount Vesuvius erupts, Caecilius returns to attempt to save his family, but is killed when a wall of his house falls on him.

- Quintus Caecilius Iucundus

The son of Lucius Caecilius Iucundus and Metella, Quintus is the main protagonist of Books 2 and 3. He escapes Pompeii along with Clemens, and travels to Athens and Alexandria. In Alexandria, he lives with Barbillus, who on his deathbed urges him to find and make amends with his son Rufus, a soldier in Britannia. At the beginning of Book 2, he is a guest of Salvius on his visit to King Cogidubnus, and tells Cogidubnus of his experiences after leaving Pompeii. In Book 3, he finds Rufus, but also becomes entangled in Salvius' plot against King Cogidubnus. Quintus appears once more in the final book, where he is present for the trial of Salvius.

- Grumio

Grumio (sometimes Lucius Spurius Pomponianius) is a slave cook working for Caecilius' family. During the book, he becomes involved in many misadventures, some of which resulting in Caecilius being harmed. During the book, it is suggested that he maintained a close relationship with Melissa, another slave owned by Caecilius. His death is left ambiguous.

- Clemens

Clemens (later Quintus Caecilius Clemens) is a slave of Caecilius' family. He tries unsuccessfully to save Caecilius in Pompeii, eventually leaving when Caecilius urges him to find Quintus and deliver his ring to him. Quintus manumits him and travels with him to Athens and Alexandria, where he buys him a glass-making shop. Clemens' efforts to establish his business and his initiation into the worship of Isis form a significant sub-plot in Book 2.

- Gaius Salvius Liberalis

Gaius Salvius Liberalis, a distant relative of Quintus, first appears in the second book. In the third book, it is revealed that he is conspiring against King Cogidubnus. In the fourth book, he becomes part of another conspiracy to exile Domitia and murder her lover Paris. In the final book, he is put on trial for his crimes and sentenced to five years of exile.

- Tiberius Claudius Cogidubnus

Cogidubnus (Togidubnus in the 5th Edition) is a client king of the Cantiaci, a tribe of Britannia. First appearing in the Book 2, he becomes a close friend of Quintus. Cogidubnus becomes ill, and it is revealed that his advisor, Salvius, is trying to murder him. Although the conspiracy fails, Cogidubnus dies in captivity of his illness.

- Belimicus and Dumnorix

Belimicus is a chieftain of the Cantiaci tribe who first appears in the Book 2. Throughout the books he is jealous of Dumnorix, the chieftain of the Regnenses. (Dumnorix is later killed when he attempts to seek help from the governor of Britain, Agricola.) He helps Salvius in his plot to kill Cogidubnus, but begins to rebel against Salvius's authority, as he feels he deserves the kingship. Belimicus is murdered by Salvius with poison at the end of Book 3.

- Quintus Haterius Latronius

Haterius is a rich client and friend of Salvius who appears first in the fourth book. He constructs the arch of Titus for Domitian. He appears again, briefly, in the fifth book, in which he follows Salvius into exile.

- Emperor Domitian

Emperor Domitian first appears in Book 4, although he had been mentioned several times before, and plays a major role in Book 5. Domitian is the one whom Salvius takes orders from. Although Domitian instigated the crimes, Salvius does not implicate the emperor in order to save his son.

=== Other characters ===
- Metella, Caecilius' wife, Quintus' mother. She is presumably killed in Pompeii with Caecilius.
- Poppaea, Grumio's lover, also a slave, who appears to have a short relationship with Clemens in Stage 11.
- Lucrio, Poppaea's elderly master.
- Hermogenes, who stole money from Caecilius and was later convicted in court.
- Cerberus, Caecilius' family dog that dies in Pompeii.
- Melissa, a very beautiful slave girl bought by Caecilius. It is sporadically suggested that she has some relationship with Grumio.
- Lucia, sister of Quintus, introduced in the 5th edition.
- Alexander, a friend of Quintus, Lucia denies and later admits that she is attracted to him.
- Diodorus, one of Alexander's little brothers.
- Thrasymachus, the other of Alexander's little brothers.
- Syphax, a slave trader from Syria.
- Felix, a former slave of Caecilius, who was freed for saving the infant Quintus from a robber.
- Decens, a would-be guest of Caecilius who apparently was killed by the ghost of Pugnax (a gladiator) on his way to the party.
- Marcus, Roman citizen, brother of Quartus.
- Quartus, Roman citizen, brother of Marcus.
- Sulla, a scribe who finds himself in the middle of a feud between Marcus and Quartus. In the 5th edition, Marcus and Quartus were removed, their feud was replaced by an argument between Quintus and Lucia.
- Julius, friend of Caecilius.
- Marcus Holconius Rufus, politician and patron of Pompeii, supported by Caecilius .
- Milo, a very famous athlete. Quintus breaks his statue's nose with a discus.
- Rufilla, Gaius Salvius Liberalis' wife, a relative of Quintus' who invites him to stay with them in Britain.
- Bregans, a lazy British slave who gets in trouble for not working.
- Loquax, slave known for singing.
- Anti-Loquax, twin of Loquax, known for dancing.
- Volubilis, Egyptian cook, slave of Salvius.
- Varica, Salvius' slave manager.
- Philus, learned slave of Salvius.
- Domitilla, deceptive slave-girl of Rufilla.
- Barbillus, a wealthy Alexandrian and a friend of Caecilius. He is based on the historical Tiberius Claudius Balbilus, a court astronomer to the emperors Claudius, Nero, and Vespasian. (Note: As stated by Caroline Bristow, director of the Cambridge Schools Classics Project, in 2023.)
- Eutychus, a mob boss in Alexandria, whom Clemens runs out of the city.
- Rufus, Barbillus' son and heir, searched for by Quintus.
- Eupor, Rufus's Greek friend.
- Lucius Marcius Memor, a lazy, greedy, obese haruspex whom Salvius coerces into his plot to murder Cogidubnus.
- Cephalus, Memor's assistant, who dies as a result of Salvius and Memor's plot against Cogidubnus.
- Modestus, a simple, clumsy, Roman soldier stationed in Britain.
- Strythio, a friend and fellow soldier of Modestus.
- Vilbia, native Briton, admirer of Modestus.
- Bulbus, admirer of Vilbia.
- Vitellia, wife of Haterius and sister of Rufilla.
- Glitus, supervisor of the craftsmen working under Haterius.
- Euphrosyne, a Greek philosopher.
- Paris, a pantomime actor.
- Myropnous, a dwarf pipe player, friend of Paris.
- Domitia, his wife, in an affair with Paris.
- Epaphroditus, a freedman of the emperor.
- Manius Acilius Glabrio, aristocrat.
- Gaius Helvidius Lupus, his friend.
- Martial, a famous poet.
- Sparsus, senator.
- Clemens, a relative of the emperor.
- Flavia, his wife.
- Polla, their daughter, in love with Helvidius but betrothed to Sparsus.
- Titus, their son, made heir to the emperor.
- Publius, their other son, also made heir to the emperor.

== In popular culture ==
The popularity of the Cambridge Latin Course is such that the series has been indirectly referenced in television. The ancillary characters Caecilius, Metella and Quintus in the Doctor Who episode "The Fires of Pompeii" are loosely based on those from the Cambridge Latin Course. In the opening episode of series four of Being Human, the "Vampire Recorder" blurts out words from Book One of the Cambridge Latin Course ("Caecilius est in horto!"), as part of the general nonsense he is chanting whilst pretending to perform a sacrificial ceremony. This likely originates from the use of the phrase "Caecilius est in horto" as a form of meme by students who have studied or are currently studying the CLC.

Grumio is the name of the slave in the TV series Plebs, and characters named Metella and Flavia also appear.

== See also ==
- Minimus – A Latin textbook for younger students, also published by the Cambridge Schools Classics Project.
