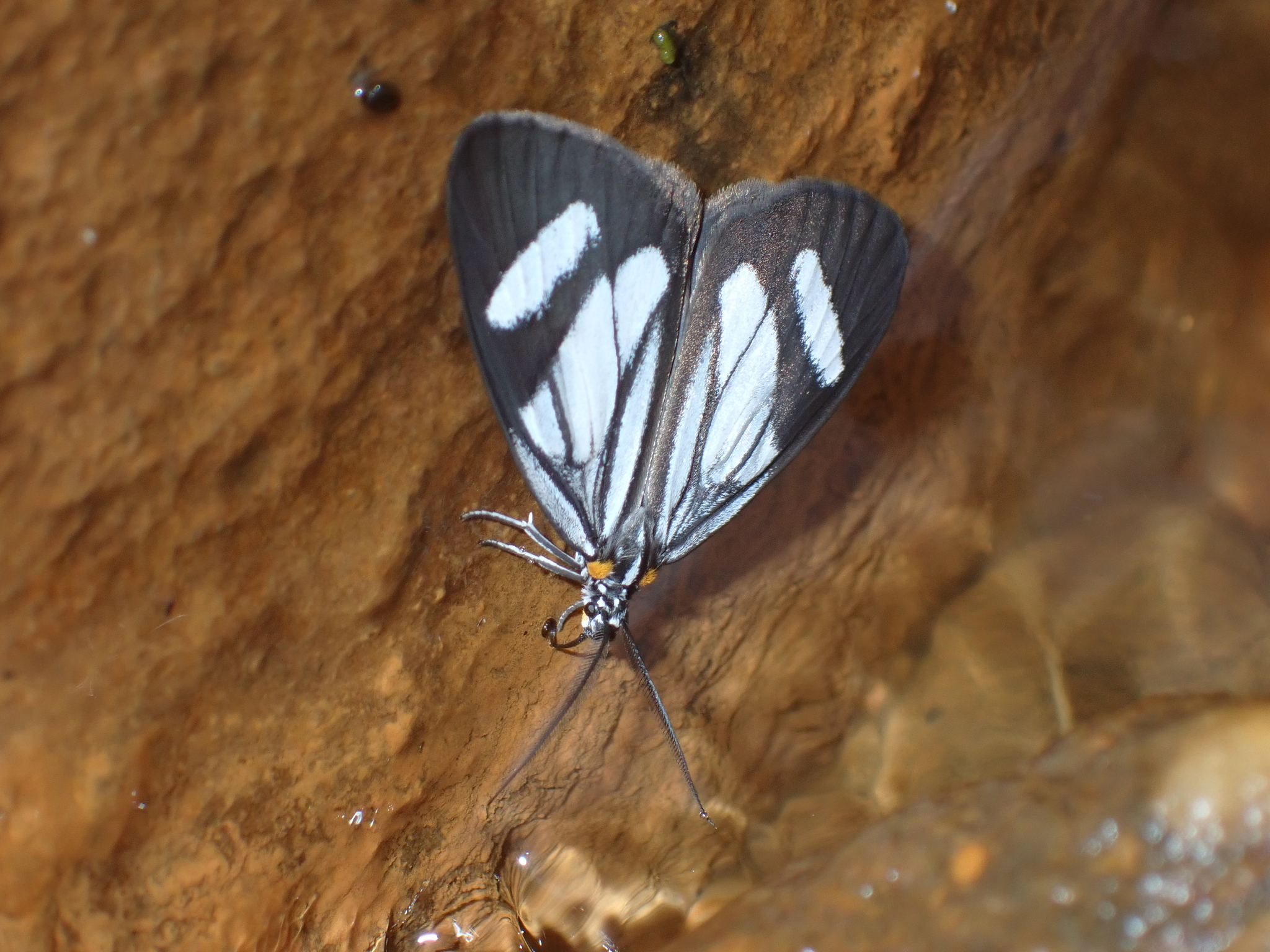
- Euchontha frigida from Villavicencio, Colombia

Scientific classification
- Kingdom: Animalia
- Phylum: Arthropoda
- Clade: Pancrustacea
- Class: Insecta
- Order: Lepidoptera
- Superfamily: Noctuoidea
- Family: Notodontidae
- Genus: Euchontha
- Species: E. frigida

Binomial name
- Euchontha frigida (Walker, 1864)

Synonyms
- Devara frigida Walker, 1864; Macroneurodes albimacula Warren, 1900; gnatholophia longinervis C. Felder & R. Felder, 1874; Euchontha sublactigera Walker, 1865

= Euchontha frigida =

Species of moth

Euchontha frigida is a moth of the family Notodontidae first described by Francis Walker in 1864. It is distributed along the eastern slope of the Andes from central Colombia south to Bolivia.
