= Euchontha commixta =

Scientific classification
- Kingdom: Animalia
- Phylum: Arthropoda
- Clade: Pancrustacea
- Class: Insecta
- Order: Lepidoptera
- Superfamily: Noctuoidea
- Family: Notodontidae
- Genus: Euchontha
- Species: E. commixta

Binomial name
- Euchontha commixta Warren, 1904

Synonyms
- Devara chilion Druce, 1907

Species of moth

Euchontha commixta is a moth of the family Notodontidae first described by William Warren in 1904. It is found in Bolivia and Peru.
