= Euchontha castrona =

Scientific classification
- Kingdom: Animalia
- Phylum: Arthropoda
- Clade: Pancrustacea
- Class: Insecta
- Order: Lepidoptera
- Superfamily: Noctuoidea
- Family: Notodontidae
- Genus: Euchontha
- Species: E. castrona

Binomial name
- Euchontha castrona Warren, 1906

Species of moth

"Euchontha" castrona is a moth of the family Notodontidae first described by William Warren in 1906. It is found in Brazil.

== Taxonomy ==
The species does not belong in Euchontha, but has not been placed in another genus yet.
