= List of Atomic Betty episodes =

This is a list of episodes from the Atomic Cartoons, Breakthrough Entertainment, Tele Images Kids and Marathon Group animated television series Atomic Betty. In North America, the show airs in a half-hour format comprising two mini-episodes. Many areas outside of North America use a 15-minute format of only one mini-episode. The second-season premiere and finale are both two-part, half-hour episodes. The show ended in Canada on January 29, 2008, with the two-part series finale, "The Future Is Now!" (later aired in North America on January 6, 2011).

== Series overview ==
Season	Segments	Episodes	Originally released	
Season	Segments	Episodes	First released	Last released
1	52	26	August 29, 2004	January 22, 2005
2	53	27	October 7, 2005	June 23, 2006
3	52	26	September 28, 2007	January 29, 2008

== Episodes ==
=== Season 1 (2004–05) ===
The order and pairing of some episodes in season one differed between Canada and the rest of the world where the show was broadcast, including the United States. Below are the order and cartoon pairing as they were aired in these areas, except Japan and the U.K., where Cartoon Network and ITV reshuffled the United States orders. Subsequent seasons were identical in both Canada and the United States.

No. overall	No. in season	Title	Directed by	Written by	U.S. air date	Prod. code
1a	1a	"Atomic Roger"	Jeffrey Agala	Jono Howard	September 17, 2004	101A
After Betty gets an embarrassing haircut from her mom, she gets called on a mission to stop Maximus from stealing the galaxy's gold resources to build a golden statue of himself. Although another Galactic Guardian, Atomic Roger, keeps arriving and saving the day before she can and stealing all the glory. Will Betty get upstaged from having the title of the Galaxy's most notable Galactic Guardian to Atomic Roger? (Villains: Maximus IQ, Atomic Roger) Writer Jono Howard was nominated for Best Screenwriting award for this script.
1b	1b	"Toxic Talent"	Ridd Sorensen & Jeffrey Agala	Deborah Jarvis	September 17, 2004	101B
Maximus is using sound waves to torture the residents of Coolosia – could this have anything to do with the horrible sound at Betty's school's Talent Show? (Villain: Maximus IQ)
2a	2a	"But the Cat Came Back"	Jeffrey Agala and Ridd Sorensen	Mike Kubat	September 19, 2004	102A
Purssy keeps sneaking into Betty's room and messing it up while she's away on galactic missions. Betty finally scares him off – with help from an alien dragon – in time to accompany Noah to a dance. (Villain: Zap Bots)
2b	2b	"Lost in Spa"	Virginie Jallot	Story by : Deborah Jarvis; Teleplay by : Dennise Fordham	September 19, 2004	102B
Admiral DeGill is captured by Maximus while on his regular half-day spa treatment on the planet Mermidia. Betty and her crew must rescue DeGill and try not to run afoul of the nasty Yoga instructor. Meanwhile, Betty frog sits for Noah on Earth. (Villain: Maximus IQ)
3a	3a	"Spindly Tam Kanushu"	Kenneth Chu and David Woodgate	Mike Kubat	September 26, 2004	103A
Betty's old martial arts trainer, Spindly Tam Kanushu, is captured by Maximus, who wants him to train his Morbidian Blood Monks in the martial arts. (Villain: Maximus IQ)
3b	3b	"Science Fair"	Virginie Jallot	Edward Kay	September 26, 2004	103B
Betty and her classmates participate in a science fair at school, while in space, Maximus attacks the water planet Aquus, and tries to capture the sea creature inhabitants for use as a discount canned pet food he hopes will take the universe by storm. (Villain: Maximus IQ)
4a	4a	"Furball for the Sneeze"	Ridd Sorensen	Mike Kubat	October 3, 2004	104A
Purrsy accidentally stows away on Betty's ship as she's off to spy on Maximus's evil gathering and soon falls into Maximus' hands. (Villain: Maximus IQ)
4b	4b	"Maximus Displeasure"	Jeffrey Agala	Mike Kubat	October 3, 2004	104B
Betty must stop Maximus from releasing a biochemical compound on the galaxy, and return home in time to clean up her mom's garden. (Villain: Maximus IQ)
5a	5a	"The Doppelganger"	Virginie Jallot	Jono Howard	October 10, 2004	105A
Betty and Noah get separated while visiting a house of mirrors at an amusement park and Betty is called off on a mission to protect a pair of scientists and their cargo from an evil shapeshifting spy known as The Chameleon. (Villain: The Chameleon)
5b	5b	"Cosmic Cake"	Virginie Jallot	Deborah Jarvis	October 10, 2004	105B
Maximus, along with Evil Chef Bernadette, has a birthday party for himself on the planet Celebra, including a cake with mind-controlling icing! While Penelope has her own birthday plans on Earth. (Villain: Maximus IQ)
6a	6a	"The Attack of the Evil Baby"	Jeffrey Agala	Jackie May	October 17, 2004	106A
Betty's fearful trip to the dentist to deal with a cavity is interrupted when she's called off to save Colorosia from the evil alien baby Infantor, who is draining magma from its planets to mold to create action figures. (Villain: Infantor)
6b	6b	"Space Brains"	Virginie Jallot	Nicole Demerse	October 17, 2004	106B
Sparky is chosen to compete in a new "Fear Factor" style game show, but something is not right. Maximus is behind the game show, and is rigging it so that Sparky wins! On Earth, Betty tries to stop her parents from selling her sci-fi posters and books at a yard sale. (Villain: Maximus IQ)
7a	7a	"When Worlds Collide"	Ridd Sorensen	Jono Howard	October 24, 2004	107A
It's Halloween and The Chameleon has stolen the Sythian President's brain and dcides to hide out on the most backwater planet he knows: Earth! Sparky and X-5 beam down to Earth to help Betty capture The Chameleon. X-5 is unimpressed with Noah, who is dressed as a robot, and Sparky gets distracted from the mission and gorges himself on Halloween candy. Meanwhile, Betty's classmates get involved in the chase and think it's all an elaborate Halloween party! (Villain: The Chameleon)
7b	7b	"The Ghost Ship of Aberdeffia"	Jeffrey Agala	Jackie May	October 24, 2004	107B
The Ranger Girls scout troop, including Betty, is sitting around a campfire one night, telling ghost stories. Betty narrates a "made up" story of Atomic "Betsy" and her crew investigating a deserted spaceship where they experience strange disturbances and noises, including the haunting cries of "Aberdeffia". Atomic Betsy saves the day, with the help of Sparky in a dress! (Villain: Ghost Pirate)
8a	8a	"The Great Race"	Ridd Sorensen	Jackie May	October 31, 2004	108A
Betty has a date after school with Dylan, the new boy in her class, but first she must stop Maximus, who has created a new explosive device known as the Shredder, which upon detonation, will destroy the time/space continuum. Now Betty is in a race to defuse the Shredder, save the galaxy, and return to Earth in time for her date! (Villain: Maximus IQ)
8b	8b	"Poached Egg"	Jeffrey Agala	Mike Kubat	October 31, 2004	108B
Chef Bernadette quits as Maximus' personal chef, so Maximus orders Minimus to make him an omelet Piraxian Rhino Egg. Problem is, there is only one such egg left in existence! Betty and her crew must stop Maximus from poaching the last egg. Meanwhile, on Earth, Betty is blamed for starting a food fight in the school cafeteria. Will Noah's video evidence clear her name? (Villain: Maximus IQ)
9a	9a	"The Really Big Game"	Jeffrey Agala	Story by: Rob Davies and Adrian Raeside Teleplay by: Jono Howard	November 7, 2004	109A
On Earth, Betty and her dad compete in a fishing derby with Penelope and her father. In space, DeGill has been captured by his old nemesis, the big game hunter Pontifadora the Conquistadora. Betty must help DeGill in time to return to the derby. (Villain: Pontifidora the Conquistadora)
9b	9b	"The Substitute"	Virginie Jallot	Edward Kay	November 7, 2004	109B
On Earth, Betty has a new substitute teacher in her art class, while in space, Sparky and X-5 have gone missing. Betty scours the galaxy, and when she finds them, they seem different. Betty soon discovers they are actually Minimus and a Blood Monk in disguise. Now Betty must free her friends, who have been captured by Maximus, and return to Earth before her art class ends. (Villain: Maximus IQ)
10a	10a	"Self Sabotage"	Virginie Jallot and David Woodgate	Anna Fregonese	November 14, 2004	110A
On Earth, Betty and her friends are running a long-distance course for gym class when Betty is called for a mission. In space, Betty arrives on her ship to discover that Sparky has dismantled it and X-5 for annual tune-ups. Sparky must quickly put everything back together again, which he does, just not correctly. Betty and her crew must manage with their mixed up ship to stop Maximus' latest scheme and return to Earth in time for Betty to finish the race. Meanwhile Minimus is furious at Maximus for not liking his gift. (Villain: Maximus IQ)
10b	10b	"Crass Menagerie"	Virginie Jallot	Story by : Alex Galatis; Teleplay by : Dennise Fordham	November 14, 2004	110B
Betty is the toast of the galaxy and is letting all the admiration go to her head, while Sparky and X-5 feel left out. When Maximus captures Betty, she becomes the newest addition to his menagerie, a collection of rare beings and objects from around the galaxy, and Betty must rely on her recently scorned friends to rescue her. (Villain: Maximus IQ)
11a	11a	"The Good, The Bad, and the Sparky"	Kenneth Chu and David Woodgate	Mike Kubat	November 21, 2004	111A
On Earth, Betty gets salesmanship advice from her father as she tries to sell candy door-to-door. Meanwhile, in space, Sparky becomes a movie star when famous galactic director Antoine Lucci casts him in his latest movie, but when Maximus gets involved, the danger on the set becomes very real! (Villain: Maximus IQ)
11b	11b	"Bye-Bye X-5"	Jeffrey Agala	Anna Fregonese	November 21, 2004	111B
Betty's mom buys a new automatic feeding and grooming machine for Purrsy, and she wants Betty to put it together! Betty takes the machine with her to space, where her mission is to test out a new, technologically advanced spaceship, complete with its own new, advanced robot, X-8.5. Will X-5 be replaced by this new, technologically advanced robot? (Villain: Maximus IQ)
12a	12a	"Battle of the Bots"	Virginie Jallot	Jackie May	November 28, 2004	112A
Spoiled, selfish Empress Narcissitad is kidnapped by Maximus and held prisoner on the computer junkyard planet of Crushton (home to X-5's uncle, B-1). Betty must rescue the Empress and perhaps learn a lesson about not being so selfish, which would serve her well as she plays in her basketball team's championship game. (Villain: Maximus IQ)
12b	12b	"Martian Makeover"	Virginie Jallot	Story by : Rob Davies; Teleplay by : Adrian Raeside	November 28, 2004	112B
On Earth, Duncan has a crush on Penelope and Noah agrees to "coach" Duncan in how to woo her if Duncan agrees to stop bullying him. In space, Betty has her own match-making problems as she must preside over an arranged marriage between warring tribes on the planet Namimbulah.
13a	13a	"Betty's Secret Admirer"	Ridd Sorensen	Dennise Fordham	December 5, 2004	113A
It's Valentine's Day on Earth, but Betty has no admirers. In space, however, she has a criminal secret admirer who is committing crimes in the name of love for her. At first, Atomic Roger is thought to be responsible, but the real culprit turns out to be someone else close to him. (Villain: Atomic Dodger)
13b	13b	"Slime of the Century"	Jeffrey Agala	Mike Kubat	December 5, 2004	113B
Maximus has a new love interest: Sparky's mom, Zulia! When Zulia finds out the truth about Maximus, she turns on him, showing just where Sparky got his fighting skills! Meanwhile, on Earth, Noah is forced to wait for perpetually late Betty again, this time at the movies. (Villain: Maximus IQ)
14a	14a	"Solar System Surfin'"	Ridd Sorensen	Story by : Rob Davies and Adrian Raeside; Teleplay by : Dennise Fordham	December 12, 2004	114A
Betty goes below the surface of Ainrofilac Ubilam and discovers a sort of aquatic wild west, where sharks are corralled like horses and shark riding outlaws run amok. Betty must stop the outlaw leader, a space cowboy by the name of Hopper the Chopper, and return to Earth to stop that "shark" Penelope from using Noah to cheat on an essay. (Villain: Hopper the Chopper)
14b	14b	"Winter Carnival"	Virginie Jallot	Edward Kay	December 12, 2004	114B
On Earth, Duncan is running for mayor of the school's winter carnival. Noah convinces Betty to run against him, but Betty is called off on a mission. In space, Betty must stop Iciclia, queen of the ice planet Glacies, who wants to freeze the tropical planet of Montego B and add it to her icy kingdom. (Villain: Iciclia)
15a	15a	"Power of the Pharaoh"	Ridd Sorensen	Jackie May	December 19, 2004	115A
The mothership of the ancient Pharotines (alien races that built the Pyramids on Earth and other planets) has been discovered and now their secrets may fall into the wrong hands (i.e. Maximus') Betty follows Maximus to the ship where they must battle booby traps, alien mummies, and an enormous pharaoh. (Villains: Maximus IQ, The Pharaoh)
15b	15b	"And the Winner is..."	Virginie Jallot	Dennise Fordham	December 19, 2004	115B
Maximus is to receive an award for his newest destructive weapon, the Overloader. Betty must go to the convention center spaceship to monitor the ceremony. Also at the convention center is the Miss Galaxy Pageant. When Maximus is not impressed with his prize, he turns his weapon on the ship. In trying to save the ship, Betty gets some unexpected help from one of the pageant contestants. (Villain: Maximus IQ)
16a	16a	"The Trouble with Triplets"	Jeffrey Agala	Story by : Rob Davies and Adrian Raeside; Teleplay by : Adrian Raeside	March 6, 2005	116A
Maximus uses the DNA from a lock of Betty's hair to create "better" versions of her that wreak havoc throughout the galaxy, while Betty gets blamed for the destruction and is pursued by the authorities. Betty must pursue Maximus and her clones and return to Earth in time to clog dance at the Heritage Days celebration. (Villains: Maximus IQ and the Betty Clones)
16b	16b	"Spider Betty"	Jeffrey Agala	Pierre Olivier	March 6, 2005	116B
Betty battles a giant spider in space and her bratty cousin Kyle on Earth. (Villain: The Spider)
17a	17a	"Power Arrangers"	Ridd Sorensen	Story by : Rob Davies and Adrian Raeside; Teleplay by : Adrian Raeside	March 13, 2005	117A
In space, Betty must stop the evil Nuclea from stealing the galaxy's power resources. On Earth, Betty's parents are away for the weekend and Betty and Purssy are forced to attend a sleepover with Penelope, Megan, Sarah, and Penelope's pet cat "Poopsie". (Villain: Nuclea)
17b	17b	"A Dream Come True"	Virginie Jallot	Bruce Robb	March 13, 2005	117B
On Earth, Betty's favorite musical artist, "Missy Miss" is coming to town, and everyone in school wants to go. In space, Betty, Sparky, and X-5 fall under the spell of Maximus' Dream-Invader, his latest invention, with which he can enter people's dreams and even manipulate them. With this device, he hopes to uncover the secret location of Betty's home planet. (Villain: Maximus IQ)
18a	18a	"Atomic Betty vs. the Giant Killer Ants"	Jeffrey Agala	Dennise Fordham	March 20, 2005	118A
On Earth, a mix up at a barbecue has Dylan thinking Betty is a vegetarian. In space, Minimus accidentally spills a growth serum on his ant farm, mistakenly creating an army of giant ants that Betty must battle. (Villain: Maximus IQ)
18b	18b	"Best (Mis) Laid Plans"	Virginie Jallot	Edward Kay	March 20, 2005	118B
Maximus steals the plans to a prototype Galactic Guardian spaceship, and Betty and her crew must infiltrate Maximus' lair to retrieve it. Meanwhile, on Earth, Betty must take Purrsy to the vet, where the precocious feline has a nasty run-in with a piranha. (Villain: Maximus IQ)
19a	19a	"No Business Like Snow Business"	Ridd Sorensen	Story by : Rob Davies and Mike Kubat; Teleplay by : Mike Kubat	March 27, 2005	119A
Betty and her crew must stop an army of Abomo-Neutrino Snowmen led by Iciclia from attacking the Temple of the Stars on the wintery planet Nordikhan. Spindly Tam arrives to help the temple monks protect the Nexus Globe, a small, snow globe-like device that houses an alternate universe that Iciclia wants to capture and rule over. Betty uses some hockey skills she learned on Earth to battle Iciclia. (Villain: Iciclia)
19b	19b	"Infantor Rules"	Virginie Jallot	Dennise Fordham	March 27, 2005	119B
On Earth, Betty's parents compete against each other in bowling. In space, a much more dangerous game gets underway as Betty, Sparky, and X-5 are sucked into a hologram titled "Infantor Rules!". Inside the game, they must battle the game obstacles and Infantor himself. Good thing Sparky is an expert hologamer! (Villain: Infantor)
20a	20a	"Galactic Pirates of the Corralean"	Ridd Sorensen	Story by : Adrian Raeside and Ridd Sorensen; Teleplay by : Adrian Raeside	April 3, 2005	120A
Betty battles evil space buccaneers (led by notorious pirate Greenbeard) in a search for intergalactic treasure, while on Earth, Noah accompanies Betty and her family on a visit to Betty's Uncle Charlie's farm. (Villains: Maximus IQ, Greenbeard)
20b	20b	"The Revenge of Masticula"	Virginie Jallot	Francoise Charpiat & Karine Lollichon	April 3, 2005	120B
Betty and her crew must battle the notorious villain Masticula, who is made of a practically indestructible rubbery material and change shape into anything. On Earth, Betty accompanies her bratty cousin Kyle to the fair. (Villain: Masticula)
21a	21a	"The Incredible Shrinking Betty"	Jeffrey Agala	Nicole Demerse	April 10, 2005	121A
The evil two feet, three and a half-inch tall villain Enormo has a device called the Reverse-Magnifying Ray, that shrinks anything it's zapped with. He manages to shrink Betty, Sparky, and X-5, who end up trapped in the fur of Enormo's large pet dog, Gryphon. The now incredibly small trio must battle this newly gigantic enemy and stop Enormo from shrinking everything in the universe. (Villain: Enormous)
21b	21b	"Friends for Eternity"	Virginie Jallot	Sebastien Viaud	April 10, 2005	121B
It's Mother's Day on Earth, and Betty plans on treating her mom to a special day, but unfortunately, she gets called off on a routine mission to retrieve some crystals on a small, remote planet inhabited by a strange little creature named Slirps who has a unique and potentially dangerous connection to the environment around him. Maximus discovers Betty is held up on this small planet and travels there to try to finish her once and for all. (Villain: Maximus IQ)
22a	22a	"Wizard of Orb"	Jeffrey Agala	Jackie May	April 17, 2005	122A
Betty must travel to the planet Mortavio to rescue the good king R-Turmex, who has been captured by the evil wizard Solovem, master of black magic. Meanwhile, on Earth, Betty, Noah, Penelope, and others compete in a skateboarding competition. (Villain: Solovem)
22b	22b	"Max-Land"	Virginie Jallot	Mike Kubat	April 17, 2005	122B
Maximus opens a self themed amusement park named Max-Land. He plans on using the rides and games in the park to brainwash the alien children attending, turning them into consumer zombies who will buy anything Maximus sells them. Meanwhile, on Earth, Betty and her mom visit Granny's home in the country, where a mysterious bracelet found in the attic may be a clue to Granny's secret identity. (Villain: Maximus IQ)
23a	23a	"Like Father, Like Scum"	Ridd Sorensen	Mike Kubat	April 24, 2005	123A
Maximus springs his father, a petty thief, out of jail. Max Sr. quickly reunites his old gang and Betty must stop the evil Maximuses from the biggest heist of all, stealing the Golden Yolk. On Earth, Betty's mom fills in at one of Betty's Ranger Girl meetings and takes the girls out to earn their shopping badge. (Villains: Maximus IQ, Maximus Sr.)
23b	23b	"Planet Stinxx"	Virginie Jallot	Michel Coulon	April 24, 2005	123B
Betty must travel to the paradise planet of Edenia and stop the evil Mylord Orus, who has destroyed it with pollution and renamed it Planet Stinxx and is now setting his sights on similarly destroying the whole galaxy by sending a giant, garbage-filled missile across the galaxy. On Earth, Noah writes a love letter to Betty and works to keep the contents of the letter a secret. (Villain: Mylord Orus)
24a	24a	"Big Top Betty"	Virginie Jallot	Deborah Jarvis	May 1, 2005	124A
The Galactic Guardians are putting on a charity circus to raise money for the Junior Galactic Guardians League, with DeGill as the ringmaster! The Chameleon sneaks in and tries to swipe the proceeds. Meanwhile, on Earth, Purrsy is competing against Penelope's pet Poopsie in a costumed pet show. (Villain: The Chameleon)
24b	24b	"Dr. Cerebral and the Stupifactor Ray"	Virginie Jallot	Jono Howard	May 1, 2005	124B
Betty tries to stop the evil Dr. Cerebral from turning the smartest minds in the galaxy into babbling idiots to become the galaxies greatest genius. On Earth, Purrsy knocks over a box of detergent into a load of laundry, causing soap suds to fill the house. (Villain: Dr. Cerebral)
25a	25a	"Jingle Brawls"	Jeffrey Agala	Jean-Marc Dobel	May 8, 2005	125A
The Chameleon wants to give Maximus something he's always wanted for Christmas—the destruction of Atomic Betty! He disguises himself as Galactic Guardian trainer Commander McSlim and lures Betty and her crew to the Galactic Guardian Academy for "Retraining" over the Christmas holidays, all under the watchful eyes of Maximus and a jealous Minimus. Meanwhile, on Earth, Betty dresses as Santa to spread holiday cheer to some pre-school kids. (Villains: Maximus IQ, The Chameleon)
25b	25b	"Toy Historyia"	Virginie Jallot	Sebastian Viaud	May 8, 2005	125B
The evil baby Infantor becomes greedy at Christmastime and demands all the toys in the galaxy. He kidnaps Santa and takes control of his factory at the North Pole Star, reprogramming the toys to his specifications. Meanwhile, on Earth, Betty accompanies her parents to the mall, where she must help her dad get a gift for her mom before the stores close. (Villain: Infantor)
26a	26a	"Franken Brain"	Ridd Sorensen	Story by : Max & Georges; Teleplay by : Anna Fregonese	May 22, 2005	126A
Betty must stop Dr. Cerebral and his henchman, a living computer virus called The Worm, from entrapping the robots vacationing at Robot Paradise (including X-5 and his uncle B-1), and creating a giant Frankenstein-like robot, with Cerebral serving as the robot's brain. On Earth, a photographer is waiting to take a picture of Purrsy and the family for the cover of "Pet Family" Magazine. (Villain: Dr. Cerebral)
26b	26b	"Evil Idol"	Virginie Jallot	Pierre Olivier	May 22, 2005	126B
Evil Idol: The galaxies' greatest villains gather at Maximus' citadel to compete to see who can destroy Atomic Betty and be crowned "Evil Idol", and on Betty's birthday too! On Earth, Betty's mom has planned a surprise party to commemorate her daughter's special day. When Betty disappears, Granny keeps making excuses for her, until Granny gets unexpectedly called away herself. (Villains: Maximus IQ, Dr. Cerebral, Iciclia, Nuclea, The Chameleon, Infantor)

=== Season 2 (2005–06) ===
- Len Carlson, the original voice of Minimus P.U., Spindly Tam Kanushu, B-1, among others, died on January 26, 2006, and the two-part episode "Takes One to Know One" was dedicated to him. He was replaced about halfway through the third and final season by Dwayne Hill, who became the different voice of Minimus and Spindly Tam, similar to Atomic Roger.
- Beatrixo Barrett's secret identity as a former, retired Galactic Guardian is confirmed here.

No. overall	No. in season	Title	Directed by	Written by	Canadian air date	U.S. air date	Prod. code
Cartoon Network U.S. era
27	1	"Bracelet Yourself"	Jeffrey Agala	Mike Kubat	October 7, 2005	October 16, 2005	201
During swim class, Betty has to put away her Galactic Guardian bracelet in her locker. But, then, Penelope finds Betty's bracelet and claims it to be hers! Meanwhile, in space, Maximus is having a birthday party and he receives a transmission from Duncan who stole the bracelet from Penelope, which leads him to set a course to destroy Earth! (Villains: Maximus I.Q., Hopper the Chopper)
28a	2a	"The New Neighbour"	David Woodgate	Story by : Rob Davies and Adrian Raeside; Teleplay by : Adrian Raeside	October 14, 2005	October 23, 2005	202a
When Nuclea moves into Maximus' territory in space, he wages war against her. Meanwhile, Betty has a new friend, named Paloma who just moved into the neighborhood. When trouble is brewing between Maximus and Nuclea, it's up to Betty to settle their rivalries. (Villains: Maximus I.Q., Nuclea)
28b	2b	"Pre-Teen Queen of Outer Space"	Kenneth Chu	Steve Schnier	October 14, 2005	October 23, 2005	202b
Betty is having trouble ice skating. And to make matters worse, Penelope is making fun of her efforts. Meanwhile, in outer space, the alien bees of Droneopolis are searching for the evilest female in the galaxy to be their queen. They abduct Penelope and make her queen of the space bees. (Villain: Queen Penelobee)
29a	3a	"Auntie Matter"	Jeffrey Agala	Jono Howard	November 4, 2005	November 6, 2005	203a
While at a visit to Granny's farm, Betty is called away on a mission and discovers that the villain—a woman who has the power to transform herself into a black hole—is actually her own maternal great aunt! She's back to get revenge on Betty's Grandma Beatrixo ( a former, retired Galactic Guardian) for imprisoning her in the first place, and nothing can stop her. It's up to Granny to save the day in a very unusual way. (Villain: Auntie Matter)
29b	3b	"Oy, Robot"	Ridd Sorensen	Steve Schnier	November 4, 2005	November 6, 2005	203b
Dr. Cerebral has obtained a new robot that can convert organic lifeforms into robots that he can control, believing that they are superior and cleaner. Betty has to stop him before he turns the entire galaxy into robots. (Villain: Dr. Cerebral)
30a	4a	"Werewolves in Zeebot"	David Woodgate	Deborah Jarvis	November 11, 2005	November 12, 2005	204a
The Chameleon is at it again to please Maximus, and this time he's using the powers of the Red Moon of Zeebot to turn the citizens into werewolf creatures, to get to the Zeebotian Truffle, a very valuable and powerful source of energy. Betty and her crew investigate, as usual. Meanwhile on Earth, Betty, her mom, and Purrsey compete in a family costume competition and Noah is forced to substitute for her, making Purrsey suspicious. (Villain: Maximus I.Q., The Chameleon)
30b	4b	"Return of the Pharaoh"	Kent Reimer	Story by : Rob Davies and Adrian Raeside; Teleplay by : Adrian Raeside	November 11, 2005	November 12, 2005	204b
The Pharaoh of the Egyptonions has returned—only this time he's not working alone, summoning ships from all across the galaxy to form an indestructible mummy monster. Betty and her crew are sent to investigate—but are forced to take along Commander Lamphray, DeGill's Beverly-Hills styled surfer nephew who had just recently gotten out of the Galactic Guardian Academy. On Earth, Betty, Paloma, and Penelope compete in a chili-eating competition to gain a free pass to the coolest amusement park in Moosejaw Heights. (Villain: The Pharaoh)
31a	5a	"Pop Goes the Maxx"	Kenneth Chu	Jono Howard	November 18, 2005	November 19, 2005	205a
Maximus has released a new line of soda, going by the name of "Fizzy Max", into the galaxy, which transforms normal citizens into mutants who become hopelessly addicted to it and will do anything for more soda. Meanwhile on Earth, Paloma is pretending to be a medium and ends up successfully predicting all of Noah and Betty's future events. (Villain: Maximus I.Q.)
31b	5b	"Sleeping Like a Baby"	Alex Salvin & Jeffrey Agala	Mike Kubat	November 18, 2005	November 19, 2005	205b
Maximus hasn't been getting much sleep and becomes mad with rage, nearly going to the brink of insanity when loud noises keep him from sleeping. He sets out to eliminate every noise in the galaxy out of his rage—and Betty is stuck babysitting, both on Earth and in space. (Villain: Maximus I.Q.)
32a	6a	"Ferried Treasure"	Kent Reimer	Story by : Rob Davies and Adrian Raeside; Teleplay by : Adrian Raeside	November 25, 2005	November 26, 2005	206a
Betty and the crew have an important mission—towing the incredibly large Querzanian Diamond across a dangerous galaxy to avoid galactic warfare—but Sparky has gone on a cruise for vacation. He soon finds out that the so-called "cruise-ship" is actually Greenbeard's pirate ship! Greenbeard claims to have "gone straight", but once Sparky tells him about the diamond, he is determined to have it. On Earth, Betty has found a model replica of her spaceship at a yard sale that she really enjoys, but can't afford the money to buy it.: The title is a pun on "buried treasure."; (Villain: Greenbeard)
32b	6b	"The X-Rays"	Ridd Sorensen	Jono Howard	November 25, 2005	November 26, 2005	206b
Admiral DeGill calls Betty, Sparky, and X-5 to attention after his office has been trashed—apparently by a space-gang called "The X-Rays". DeGill wants them to go undercover as rebels and find out what they're up to. Being an X-Ray is fun, at first...but what happens when the group of punks decides to interfere with Maximus? Meanwhile, on Earth, Duncan has developed a crush on Paloma due to her kindness towards him and won't leave her alone, so she resolves it...in her own special way. (Villains: Maximus I.Q., The X-Rays)
33a	7a	"By Virtuoso of Insanity"	David Woodgate	Mike Kubat	December 2, 2005	December 3, 2005	207a
While taking a bath, Maximus is enraged with Minimus, and when he rears up to strike the little creature, Minimus comments that his voice is beautiful, and asking if he had ever considered a singing career. Maximus decides to take his show on the road, playing at the fanciest theatre in the Galaxy. There's only one thing wrong: His performance speakers are hypnotizing the audience to meet his expected standards! Meanwhile, Betty and her band have a gig for a social event, but Betty is called away on her mission, leaving the band behind and making them feel as if she has forgotten them. (Villain: Maximus I.Q.)
33b	7b	"SWITCH-MO-tized"	Kenneth Chu	Nicole Demerse	December 2, 2005	December 3, 2005	207b
While volunteering at a magic show, a robot magician named Switchmo switches Sparky and Minimus's bodies—now Sparky is stuck in Minimus's body, and Minimus in Sparky's! After a failed attempt to stop Switchmo, Betty and Maximus are forced to team up to stop this mad magician from declaring himself the Supreme Overlord of the Galaxy. Meanwhile on Earth, Penelope wants Betty's locker, so she tries to sabotage it to make Principal Peterson think that she isn't maintaining school property well. (Villain: Maximus I.Q., Switchmo)
34	8	"The No-L Nine"	Mauro Casalese	Story by : Kevin Gillis and Alex Galatis; Teleplay by : Alex Galatis	December 17, 2005	December 4, 2005	215
Atomic Betty leaves a hectic Christmas on Earth to rescue a constellation of nine planets known as the No-L 9 from being shrunk down to tree ornament size by the evil Maximus I.Q. (Villains: Maximus I.Q., Infantor) Note: Betty's long-lost grandfather Jimmy, Beuatrixo's dear husband, is finally discovered and returns home to his wife and grown up daughter after many years.
35a	9a	"Captain Sparky"	Alex Salvin & Jeffrey Agala	Steve Schnier	December 9, 2005	December 10, 2005	208a
After "accidentally" rescuing a baby, Sparky is declared a hero and is promoted to the rank of Captain—with his own ship, crew, and everything! Betty and X-5 try to be happy for their friend, but what happens when Nuclea attempts to drill all the energy out of the Bangoon sun and the two must work together? Meanwhile on Earth, Penelope is filming everyone's most embarrassing moments on videotape, threatening to play it for the whole school the next day. (Villain: Nuclea)
35b	9b	"Earth to Roger"	Kent Reimer	Story by : Rob Davies and Adrian Raeside; Teleplay by : Adrian Raeside	December 9, 2005	December 10, 2005	208b
While talking to her friends about the school dance, Betty is horrified to see that Atomic Roger has landed on Earth, thinking he has heard a distress call from Betty—and he's not leaving until Betty returns his romantic affections for her! In the meantime, however, Betty and her crew must stop Iciclia, who is reflecting the sun of planet Glacies (which has gone Supernova) onto other worlds, causing very destructive and fiery results. (Villain: Iciclia)
The Hub Network era
36a	10a	"Hi-Jinxed"	Ridd Sorensen	Nicole Demerse	February 28, 2006	October 21, 2010	209a
In space a small gnarly imp-like creature named Jinx steals all of the galaxy's good luck, leaving nothing but bad luck in his wake. On Earth, Betty is concerned Penelope and Paloma may be becoming friends. (Villain: Jinx)
36b	10b	"Robo-Betty"	David Woodgate	Story by : Rob Davies and Adrian Raeside; Teleplay by : Adrian Raeside	February 28, 2006	October 21, 2010	209b
Betty discovers a lone survivor of an old Galactic Guardian spaceship, Captain Lure, and takes the Captain on board her spaceship but soon they fall prey to a trap set by Maximus. Meanwhile, a prototype Robo-Betty ends up at Noah's birthday party. (Villain: Maximus I.Q.)
37a	11a	"Take Two Evils and Call Me in the Morning"	Kenneth Chu	Mike Kubat	March 3, 2006	October 25, 2010	210a
Maximus is sick. Minimus takes over his master's evil duties and orders scavenger probes to capture "That girl, Betty". Soon the citadel is overrun with hundreds of Betty's from all over the galaxy. On Earth, it's Boys vs. Girls: Ranger Girls vs. Trackfinder Boys. (Villain: Maximus I.Q.)
37b	11b	"The Scribe"	Kent Reimer	Norman Lauzon	March 3, 2006	October 25, 2010	210b
A new super-villain, The Scribe, has banned all books except those by someone named Milton Scrivener. He is also kidnapping all the galaxy's greatest writers and stealing their ideas. On Earth Noah and Paloma reluctantly team up to create a comic book based on Betty. (Villain: The Scribe)
38a	12a	"Mad Maximus"	Jeffrey Agala	Written by : Adrian Raeside; Story by : Mauro Casalese and Adrian Raeside	March 10, 2006	November 1, 2010	211a
Spindly Tam asks Betty to protect the Beluvian Demon Box, which houses a powerful demon. A "Mad Max" style race unfolds as Maximus, Dr. Cerebral, and Pontifadora all pursue the box. On Earth, Betty, Paloma, and Noah explore the gorge. (Villains: Maximus I.Q., Pontifidora, Dr. Cerebral)
38b	12b	"The Cheerleaders of Doom"	Dave Woodgate	Morgan Barnes	March 10, 2006	November 1, 2010	211b
The evil Betty triplets are back, now as cheerleaders who can hypnotize people with their cheers. On Earth, Penelope is appointed hall monitor and lets the power go to her head. (Villains: Maximus IQ and the Betty Clones)
39a	13a	"Reeking Havoc"	Kent Reimer	Jono Howard	March 17, 2006	November 2, 2010	212a
Betty is called upon to fight against a giant genie whilst Penelope steals Betty's spotlight as the leader of her band on Earth while she's away. (Villain: Schmoz)
39b	13b	"Practically Joking"	Ridd Sorensen	Steve Schnier	March 17, 2006	November 2, 2010	212b
Betty must find a way to free people who have been captured by a troll who is simply doing it for his own amusement. Meanwhile, Betty must try to find a way to stump Duncan at his own game of pulling pranks. (Villain: Mulock the Troll)
40a	14a	"The Great Sub-TRAIN-ean Robbery"	Kenneth Chu	Story by : Rob Davies and Adrian Raeside; Teleplay by : Adrian Raeside	March 24, 2006	November 3, 2010	213a
Hopper the Chopper returns in an attempt to rob a train containing material to make indestructible metal. Can Betty prevent it from happening? (Villain: Hopper the Chopper)
40b	14b	"The Minion"	Jeffrey Agala	Story by : Rob Davies and Adrian Raeside; Teleplay by : Adrian Raeside	March 24, 2006	November 3, 2010	213b
Maximus goes on a scout to look for a minion to replace Minimus; sending the universe into a major crime spree as people work to become the next "Minion"? Meanwhile, on Earth, Betty and Paloma team up against Penelope in a soccer competition. (Villains: Maximus I.Q., The Chameleon)
41a	15a	"Eternal Elixir"	Ridd Sorensen	Jono Howard	April 7, 2006	November 5, 2010	214a
Maximus and Nuclea team compete to locate an immortality potion. Can Betty beat them to it before either of them become immortal? Meanwhile, Betty's Mom helps Purrsy stay fit. (Villains: Maximus I.Q., Nuclea)
41b	15b	"Bee Movie"	Kent Reimer & Emmett Hall	Steve Schnier	April 7, 2006	November 5, 2010	214b
Queen PeneloBee returns, except this time, she's looking for a mate. Meanwhile, on Earth, it's Jackamoose Appreciation Day all around town. (Villain: Queen Penelobee)
42a	16a	"Evil Juniors"	David Woodgate	Story by : Rob Davies and Adrian Raeside; Teleplay by : Adrian Raeside	April 14, 2006	November 8, 2010	216a
Betty is called off to a mission where she must teach young Galactic Guardians in training the power of responsibility but it's all a front for Maximus' latest scheme to eliminate Betty. (Villain: Maximus I.Q.)
42b	16b	"As the Worm Turns"	Kenneth Chu	Steve Schnier	April 14, 2006	November 8, 2010	216b
Maximus is using a powerful telescope-like device to destroy asteroids and even some planets and Betty must stop Maximus before he succeeds in destroying entire planets and eventually the Galactic Guardian HQ. (Villain: Maximus I.Q.)
43a	17a	"Extreme Makeover"	Jeffrey Agala	Morgan Barnes	April 21, 2006	November 9, 2010	217a
An evil villainess named Bombshelle is committing fashion-related crimes across the galaxy while, on Earth, Betty's band shoots their first music video. (Villain: Bombshelle)
43b	17b	"Once Bitten, Twice Slimed"	Kent Reimer	Mike Kubat	April 21, 2006	November 9, 2010	217b
Zulia unwittingly helps Max Sr escape from prison! Meanwhile, Purrsy is celebrating a birthday. (Villains: Max Sr.)
44a	18a	"The Collector"	Ridd Sorensen	Steve Schnier	April 28, 2006	November 10, 2010	218a
The Collector is bent on stealing a legendary gem. On Earth, Betty's bratty cousin, Kyle pesters Betty's friends about a comic book. (Villain: The Collector)
44b	18b	"Night of the DeGilla Monster"	David Woodgate	Story by : Rob Davies; Teleplay by : Adrian Raeside	April 28, 2006	November 10, 2010	218b
Admiral DeGill creates a clone of himself but things don't go as planned when the clone turns on DeGill and teams with Pontifadora! Meanwhile, Betty and her Dad help Mom host a party on Earth. (Villains: Pontifidora the Conquistadora, DeGilla)
45a	19a	"Big Bad Plant From Outer Space"	Kenneth Chu	Morgan Barnes	May 5, 2006	November 11, 2010	219a
A tiny plant Betty must transport to a planet starts to grow at an alarming rate! Meanwhile, on Earth, Betty does a few chores.
45b	19b	"Nuclea Infected"	Kent Reimer	Mike Kubat	May 5, 2006	November 11, 2010	219b
Nuclea absorbs a Grey Hole and gains the ability to absorb matter and transform it into pure energy while, on Earth, at the zoo, Noah uncovers a mysterious secret about Paloma. (Villain: Nuclea)
46a	20a	"The Brat Pack Attack"	Jeff Agala	Norm Lauzon	May 12, 2006	November 15, 2010	220a
Infantor forms an army of obedient slaves to do his bidding while, on Earth, Paloma and Betty try to keep Betty's cousin Kyle from getting into trouble at the mall. (Villain: Infantor)
46b	20b	"A Fungus Amongus"	Ridd Sorensen	Norm Lauzon	May 12, 2006	November 15, 2010	220b
A former foe, Mylord Orus, escapes from prison with a "son" Shermie the Germie a mutant metal-eating fungus. Meanwhile, Betty and Noah must clean up Purrsy's litter box before they can leave for a game later on. (Villain: M'Lord Orus)
47a	21a	"The Gazundheit Factor"	Dave Woodgate	Steve Schnier	May 19, 2006	November 16, 2010	221a
Dr. Cerebral's most recent creation, The Gloob, gets out and goes on a rampage setting course for Earth! Meanwhile, Betty hosts a TV Show. (Villain: Dr. Cerebral)
47b	21b	"Good Kitty"	Kent Reimer	Story by : Rob Davies and Adrian Raeside; Teleplay by : Adrian Raeside	May 19, 2006	November 16, 2010	221b
Maximus mysteriously turns nice and Betty is sent to investigate, while, on Earth, Betty and her family are contemplating a move. (Villains: The Chameleon, Max Sr.)
48a	22a	"The Strange Case of Minimus-Hyde"	Kenneth Chu	Norman Lauzon	May 26, 2006	November 17, 2010	222a
When Minimus' head gets stuck on "nasty", he turns into a raging monster that may prove to be a formidable foe for Betty. Meanwhile, on Earth, Betty and Paloma meet Noah's parents as we learn more about them as to their strange careers. (Villain: Minimus P.U.)
48b	22b	"The Market"	Jeffrey Agala	Anna Fregonese	May 26, 2006	November 17, 2010	222b
Betty, X-5, and Sparky are all sold into slavery! Will Betty's quick thinking get them out of this mess? Meanwhile, Paloma and Noah try to rescue a raccoon from Penelope.
49a	23a	"Galactic Guardians No More!"	Dave Woodgate	Anna Fregonese	June 2, 2006	November 18, 2010	223a
With no new villains on the prow, Headquarters considers disbanding the Galactic Guardians but is this all part of Maximus' secret scheme? Meanwhile, on Earth, Betty enters a pumpkin pie baking contest. (Villains: Maximus I.Q., Infantor, Iciclia)
49b	23b	"Scribe 2: The Re-Scribing"	Kent Reimer	Norman Lauzon	June 2, 2006	November 18, 2010	223b
The Scribe returns from jail, kidnapping a romance novelist as a hostage who as it turns out, is Sparky's Mother! Meanwhile on Earth, Betty and her Mom join a book club. (Villain: The Scribe)
50a	24a	"No-Hit Wonders"	Ridd Sorensen	Steve Schnier	June 9, 2006	November 22, 2010	224a
The Voice, a new villain, is stealing people's voices across the galaxy. Can Betty stop him in time before she loses her own voice? On Earth, Betty's school is having a charity dance competition. (Villain: The Voice)
50b	24b	"License DeGill"	Kenneth Chu	Story by : Garnet Syberg-Olsen; Teleplay by : Adrian Raeside	June 9, 2006	November 22, 2010	224b
Admiral DeGill is framed for lying about a major mission, one of the most serious crimes in the Galactic Guardian code of conduct, and things aren't looking good for him. Can Betty clear his name before it's too late? Meanwhile, Noah desperately tries to get Betty to go to a movie with him. (Villain: Boltar)
51a	25a	"Case of the Missing Kanushu"	Jeffrey Agala	Mike Kubat	June 16, 2006	November 23, 2010	225a
Betty is called to Spindley Tam's fortress to investigate his mysterious disappearance whilst, on Earth, Noah presents a rare coin for show-and-tell. (Villain: Koreena)
51b	25b	"Devolution City"	Kent Reimer	Morgan Barnes	June 16, 2006	November 23, 2010	225b
An ancient witch doctor uses her powers to devolve an advanced alien civilization into cave people, and plots to turn an entire planet into a black hole. Meanwhile, on Earth, Noah tries to prove that nearby crop circles show signs of aliens. (Villain: Shaka Booga)
52a	26a	"Amulet of Shangri-La-De-Da"	Ridd Sorensen	Morgan Barnes	June 23, 2006	November 24, 2010	226a
Betty is called upon to protect an amulet of the ancient bird-people of Shangri-La-De-Da, said to give the wearer unimaginable power. Meanwhile, Purrsy gets stuck up a tree on Earth, enough to cause mass Disturbia. (Villain: Maximus I.Q.)
52b	26b	"Best Dressed Villain"	Kent Reimer	Story by : Jono Howard; Teleplay by : Norman Lauzon	June 23, 2006	November 24, 2010	226b
Minimus has accidentally created a new super suit that makes Maximus all-powerful; is the only thing capable of defeating this "Mighty Maximus" is two Betties? Meanwhile, Betty and her friends go to a fair. (Villain: Maximus I.Q.)
53	27	"Takes One to Know One"	David Woodgate	Mike Kubat	June 23, 2006	November 25, 2010	227
Betty has been invited to Noah's place, where he's about to demonstrate to her a satellite radio (that inadvertently eavesdrops on Admiral DeGill's personal activities). Leaving, she sees Paloma being chased by Duncan as a result of a prank. Before Duncan can catch either of them, a spaceship appears out of nowhere and abducts Paloma, to Betty's horror. Beaming aboard her ship, she discovers that Sparky and X-5 are being held hostage by Paloma's younger sister, Juanita. Demanding an explanation, Juanita explains that she is, in fact, a Galactic Guardian who is responsible for Paloma's safety. Betty and her crew are forced to accept help from Juanita to save Paloma. Paloma is, in fact, one of the twin daughters of Golgotha, whose people have the ability to shapeshift into any living thing. However, Golgotha became power-hungry, and unleashed a demon who couldn't be transformed into on her own people; the demon is, in fact, Paloma's father. Without the ability to transform into the demon, Golgotha terrorized her own people, until the couple was ultimately defeated by the best warriors from the other planets. These warriors, in turn, banded together to form the first generation of Galactic Guardians. Since then, the demon had been sealed within a box under Spindly Tam Kanushu's care, and the key to unlocking the box was hidden in a ceramic duck that Maximus had recently acquired. For some time, Paloma's twin sister, Pandora, has tried to secure both of these items, and on one occasion Paloma was the cause of her defeat. Since then, Paloma had been placed in a witness protection program, and assumed a normal life on Earth; Juanita had incorrectly assumed that the presence of Betty would allow her to loosen her guard; however, Betty had never learned of Paloma's secret. Meanwhile, Pandora has managed to secure both of the artifacts needed to resurrect her father, defeating both Spindly Tam and Maximus, and Admiral DeGill, and has captured Paloma as one of her sacrifices. Betty is forced to team up with a freed Maximus (intending to recover the stolen duck) to mount an attack on Pandora's base. However, it's too late: the demon has resurrected. The combined force of the guardians and Maximus is unable to defeat the demon, but Paloma, from within captivity, can free herself, and seal her father and her twin sister in the box, using the good powers that she had inherited from her father. The box is returned to Spindly Tam's temple, while the key somehow finds its way into Noah's possession, overloading the satellite radio and teleporting him into Maximus' citadel. The episode ends on a cliffhanger as Maximus returns to his own citadel, with Noah in his personal quarters. (Villains: Pandora and Beluvian Demon): Note: This episode was dedicated to Len Carlson's memory who died of a heart attack on January 26, 2006 at the age of 68.

=== Season 3: Mission: Earth (2007–08) ===
- The third and final season entitled Atomic Betty: Mission Earth begins by resolving the cliffhanger ending from the previous season. For this season, a new series opening and theme song was given.
- This is the last where Minimus P.U. and Spindly Tam Kanushu are both voiced by Dwayne Hill from beginning to end.
- A sequel series, consisting of the seventeen-year-old Atomic Betty from the two-part series finale, was planned to air in 2013, but was never made.

No. overall	No. in season	Title	Original release date	Prod. code
54	1	"No Space Like Home"	September 28, 2007	301
Previously, Pandora and her father had been re-imprisoned. However, the reimprisonment had also managed to teleport Noah into Maximus' base. When Betty hears of Noah's apparent capture, Betty goes to save him while Paloma tries to defuse the mass hysteria that has hit Moose Jaw. Meanwhile, while Minimus keeps Noah company as a playmate, Maximus employs the Chameleon to disguise himself as Noah, who is subsequently "rescued" by Betty. Returning to Galactic Guardian headquarters, Betty remarks that Noah would make a great Galactic Guardian, just as Maximus arrives with his armada. Noah inadvertently destroys Galactic Guardian headquarters when a superball he and Minimus were playing with activates Maximus' weapon. With Galactic Guardian headquarters destroyed, Admiral DeGill decides to build a temporary headquarters on Earth, underneath Moose Jaw, much to the chagrin of Betty. While Paloma and Juanita help build the base, and Sparky and X-5 adjust to Betty's civilian life, Betty discovers the Chameleon's ruse after discovering that "Noah" is afraid of Purrsy and appears to not know the way back to his own house from hers. Paloma rescues Noah after disguising herself as the Chameleon and sneaking aboard Maximus' ship but is forced to say one last goodbye to Betty to get Maximus away from Earth and prevent its destruction. After the ordeal, Betty keeps her word and allows Noah to join the Galactic Guardians as a cadet. Note 1: Final main character appearance of Paloma and Juanita. Note 2: It also marks the final time the Chameleon appears as a major villain. Note 3: This is the first time since Bracelet Yourself that Sparky dons his Earth disguise. (Villains: Maximus IQ, The Chameleon)
55a	2a	"Family Feuds"	October 1, 2007	302a
Betty must stop a fight between Infantor and his younger brother before they hurt each other, or someone else. Meanwhile, Betty's mom becomes the new dance teacher at Betty's school. (Villains: Infantor and his brother)
55b	2b	"Girl Power"	October 1, 2007	302b
Pontifidora steals a magical crystal that turns ordinary girls (and Sparky into a busty female version of himself) into strong Amazon women and she uses them to get revenge on Admiral Degill. On Earth, Betty and Penelope compete against each other to impress the new girl in school, Regeena. (Villain: Pontifidora the Conquistadora)
56a	3a	"Arr! It is 'olidays!"	October 2, 2007	303a
It's the time of year that Betty and her family take a family trip to a pirate-themed amusement park, leaving X-5 to take care of the house, but not before X-5 hands Betty his new invention. Meanwhile, in space, Greenbeard's ship has fallen apart whilst in the middle of stealing jewels from the planet Pacula. Greenbeard demands to find a new ship and arrives on Earth at the theme park. As Betty and her family settle ongoing into a waterslide with a pirate ship, Greenbeard also sets his sights on it to use as his new ship. Seeing Greenbeard, Betty attempts to corral her parents to safety, but Betty's parents believe Greenbeard and his crew are park employees putting on a show. As Betty retreats to find Sparky, Greenbeard takes Betty's parents hostage after hearing about Betty's mother's snacks, which were termed "gold bars". Taking the ship and Betty's parents with them, Greenbeard leaves Earth for Pacula to make another attempt at the jewels. After refusing to hand over the "gold bars", Greenbeard attempts to keelhaul Betty's parents, but they are saved by Sparky, who had been on the ride when Greenbeard had hijacked the ship. Betty, her parents, and Sparky return to the deck of the ship just as Greenbeard discovers that there are too many jewels to steal, and the ship can't hold them all. After an explosion occurs on the ship caused by having too many jewels, Greenbeard attempts to steal the "gold bars" again as a consolation prize, but he and his crew are quickly dispatched by Betty, her parents, and Sparky (Betty's father taking photos as the other three were doing the fighting). However, they are unable to control the ship, as it drifts at high speed towards Earth. However, thanks to X-5's invention (a motorized pinwheel), the ship can reenter Earth's atmosphere safely, and the ship lands back at the amusement park. (Villain: Captain Greenbeard)
56b	3b	"Rodeo Robots"	October 2, 2007	303b
Betty and her crew are with her uncle Charlie, where they are enjoying the Moose Jaw Heights Rodeo. Sparky is ecstatic, not because he has never been to a rodeo, but because of the prospects of food. When Charlie asks Betty and company if they want to ride a horse, Sparky insists on riding the untamable horse, Thunderbolt. Meanwhile, Dr. Cerebral has arrived at Crushton, intent on finding spare parts for his latest scheme to destroy Atomic Betty. He discovers a robot remote control, which he dismisses, before discovering Robo-Betty, helping B-1 restore his space cruiser. Robo-Betty is abducted by Cerebral and leads him to Galactic Guardian Headquarters. Back at the rodeo, Admiral DeGill, also at the rodeo, gets word of Robo-Betty's abduction and orders Betty to stop Cerebral. While distracted by Chaz, Betty and X-5 are discovered by Cerebral. As Betty escapes Cerebral's gunfire, X-5 tries to confront Robo-Betty, only to be kicked onto Sparky, still riding Thunderbolt. X-5 manages to tame Thunderbolt, and the two of them together return to assist Betty. Meanwhile, while Robo-Betty has a temporary malfunction after she meets Chaz, Betty has gained the upper hand on Cerebral. However, this wouldn't last: as Cerebral accidentally throws out a rubber snake that he had won from inadvertently being knocked into a carnival game, it spooks Sparky and X-5 off Thunderbolt, knocking the two on Betty and allowing Robo-Betty to tie the three up. Strapping Betty and her crew on a rocket-powered steer, Cerebral and Robo-Betty celebrate their victory in front of a grandstand full of fans just as B-1 arrives from Crushton. B-1 manages to use a tow line to stop the steer, but Robo-Betty manages to knock B-1 out of his cruiser. B-1 confronts Robo-Betty directly, causing Cerebral's remote control to wear off. Robo-Betty destroys the remote control herself, just as Betty and her crew free themselves, with Thunderbolt's assistance. Cerebral is chased off Earth by his rocket steer, while B-1 and Robo-Betty take their leave. The episode ends as Betty and Chaz finally enjoy a line dance together, while Sparky and X-5 ride on top of Thunderbolt into the sunset. (Villain: Dr. Cerebral)
57a	4a	"Who's the Baby Now?"	October 3, 2007	304a
Betty helps Noah with his training but is turned into a baby by Infantor. Noah uses his new skills and an army of babies to save the day. (Villain: Infantor)
57b	4b	"Spliced"	October 3, 2007	304b
Spindly Tam has accidentally crossed his D.N.A with the evil Soo-Soo fly and he's now on a rampage, splicing DNA and turning people into freaks. Reegena sees the freaks and starts thinking that they were taken right out of the horror movie she and Betty saw. (Villain: Soo-Soo Tam)
58a	5a	"April Fools Overture"	October 4, 2007	305a
It's April Fools Day on Earth and Sparky gets a little carried away with his pranks because he wants to be like the host of his favourite 3V show "Prank'd". But then, the host comes to Earth to stop Sparky because he thinks he's trying to steal his show. And to make matters worse, Sparky's pranks unintentionally pin the blame on Betty causing the town to turn an angry mob against her. In addition to this, Maximus follows the host to get revenge on him for pulling a nasty prank on him. (Villain: Maximus IQ)
58b	5b	"Crimes of Fashion"	October 4, 2007	305b
Bombshelle is back, and this time she starts a fashion craze with the Galaxy Mood Suit, which hypnotizes anyone who wears them and forces them to help her commit a whole bunch of crimes. Betty and Noah are the only ones not wearing the suits, so now it's up to them to stop Bombshelle before it's too late. (Villain: Bombshelle)
59a	6a	"The Big Dig"	October 5, 2007	306a
While trying to dig a new private swimming pool in Galactic Guardian headquarters, the Bangoons unearth a rare and valuable opal. Because it can also be dangerous, Betty is tasked with its proper storage, but Admiral DeGill also tells her to keep the mission secret. Returning to the surface, Noah, who had been with Betty when she was summoned alone, chastises Betty over leaving him in the dark; Betty reluctantly tells her mission to him but also warns him to keep it a secret. Later at school, Noah shares the secret to Sparky, who, being a gossiper, spreads the news to everyone he finds. The gold rush mentality spreads, attracting the attention of Max Sr. and Hopper the Chopper, who journey to Earth, intending to take the treasures for themselves. When Betty gets word of the news spreading, she quickly chastises Noah for telling Sparky, before receiving orders to stop Hopper. However, she fails to either stop Hopper or Max Sr., who had arrived shortly after, in separate attacks. Back at headquarters, the situation is getting worse: treasure diggers have nearly dug their way into the roof of headquarters. To prevent further damage to headquarters, Betty has Noah spread a (fabricated) rumor to the supposed treasure's exact location, underneath the Jackamoose statue, and also the fact that the treasure is cursed. As Noah and Sparky prepare to dig the (planted) treasure, both Hopper and Max Sr. appear to jump their claims; upon discovering each other, the two groups turn on each other before a giant golden Jackamoose (a large robot piloted by Betty, X-5, and Admiral DeGill) appears to scare both groups away. As for the townspeople, Sparky reveals the treasure to be nothing more than a box of chocolate chip cookies. (Villains: Max Sr. and Hopper The Chopper)
59b	6b	"Wedding Crashers"	October 5, 2007	306b
Betty's grandparents have arranged for a "just for fun" remarriage ceremony at the form, to be organized by Sparky. After nearly forgetting about the invitations, Sparky sends out invitations to Zulia, Spindly Tam, and also Auntie Matter, the villainous sister to Beatrixo. Later, Betty is concerned that she can't afford to purchase a special locket for her grandmother as a wedding gift, though Sparky and X-5 agree to help her raise the money to buy the locket. At the wedding, both Betty's parents and the whole Galactic Guardian organization (which Betty's mother assumes to be all odd-looking relatives from the opposite side of the family) are in attendance for the ceremony; but it's soon interrupted by Auntie Matter, who abducts Jimmy. As Auntie Matter retreats into deep space, Betty and Beatrixo pursue her on the Century Warbler; however, it was just a ruse to lead the two away as Auntie Matter returns to Earth with Jimmy. Auntie Matter plots to push Jimmy into a black hole that acts as her source of power, which would grant Jimmy the same powers and allow the pair to elope. Betty and Beatrixo return in time to free Jimmy, who then tells Auntie Matter that he doesn't love her. Auntie Matter is eventually defeated when Betty overloads the black hole with a large bouquet that spews out confetti, which causes Auntie Matter to lose her powers. With the wedding back in order, Betty apologizes to Beatrixo about her present, which was lost in the black hole. Beatrixo forgives her, saying that her presence is more than enough as a present. (Villain: Auntie Matter)
60a	7a	"Night of the Living Mummies"	October 8, 2007	307a
Betty goes to a party at the museum where Penelope's dad has named an Egyptian wing after his daughter. But during the party, Penelope stumbles onto a magic necklace that brings all of the mummies in the museum to life. (Villain: The Pharaoh)
60b	7b	"Trick or Creep"	October 8, 2007	307b
Betty tries to make a monster movie with her friends but gets interrupted when Maximus invades Earth with an army of pumpkin monsters. (Villain: Maximus IQ)
61a	8a	"Roger, Where Are You?"	October 9, 2007	308a
Atomic Roger comes to Earth with a doomsday device to deliver to Degill, but Purrsey gets his claws on it and thinks it's some kind of giant cat toy. Now Betty must find the device before it goes off. (Villain: Doomsday device)
61b	8b	"Betty the Red"	October 9, 2007	308b
After capturing an army of mini warriors, Betty brings them to Earth where they break loose. Now Betty must deal with both the warriors and Penelope, who won't stop making fun of Betty for being a redhead. (Villain: Enormo)
62a	9a	"Mini-Maximus"	October 15, 2007	309a
Maximus sends Minimus to Earth to kidnap Purrsey so Maximus can have him all to himself, all while Betty and Purrsey are being "brought closer together" by Betty's mom and a clueless TV psychiatrist (bearing an uncanny resemblance to Dr. Phil). (Villain: Maximus IQ)
62b	9b	"Circus Sparkimus"	October 15, 2007	309b
Betty's plans to go fishing with her dad are interrupted when Barker, an evil circus carney, brings her carnivorous circus to Earth in search of a Galactic Guardian to throw into the ring and makes Sparky the main attraction. (Villain: Barker)
63a	10a	"Shake Your Booga"	October 16, 2007	310a
While Betty and X-5 are waiting for Sparky to finish using the bathroom after ingesting too many montegoberries, Sparky finds a set of bongo drums at a yard sale, which he buys as a birthday gift for Regeena. As Sparky plays the drums, it awakens Shaka Booga, who discovers that her drums missing. Finding Atomic Roger nearby, she manages to have him take him to Earth and Regeena's party. This doesn't go unnoticed by Admiral DeGill, who takes a furious Betty (about to dance with Chaz) and Sparky to discover why Atomic Roger has been taken hostage and why she's heading for Earth; Shaka Booga arrives at the party in her absence, and turns all the partygoers into cave-kids (Duncan, however, is surprisingly unaffected), ordering them to steal shiny objects using the power of the bongos. Later, Admiral DeGill orders Betty back to the party; Betty is overjoyed at the news (believing the case was being reassigned), but to her horror discovers the truth after returning to the party. Betty and X-5 manage to fight off her cave-kid friends, capture the bongos, and get Shaka Booga to return her friends to normal, in exchange for the bongos. (Villain: Shaka Booga)
63b	10b	"Cosmic Comicon"	October 16, 2007	310b
Noah invites Betty to a comic book convention, where he shows her a new comic book he authored, titled Atomic Chick, loosely based on Betty's adventures. While Betty chastises Noah for not keeping her secret, Noah reassures her that a "small indie comic" wouldn't garner much attention — only to find that Atomic Chick is a hit, and everyone is dressed as characters from the comic book. Still, Noah reassures Betty that all names have been "slightly modified to protect the innocent" to preserve Betty's secret: Sparky is "Spark Dude", X-5 is "Q-7", and Admiral DeGill is "Commander LeFin" (all three are at the convention, dressed as their Atomic Chick counterparts). Even Regeena is dressed as "Dr. Brainy", the Atomic Chick counterpart to Dr. Cerebral. Meanwhile, the angry Dr. Cerebral is offended by "Dr. Brainy", and goes after Regeena to steal Brainy's version of a part needed for his doomsday device (unaware that Cerebral himself has the working version and Regeena has the lookalike). Cerebral and Regeena manage to switch their parts, while Betty takes the opportunity to leave with X-5 (who dislikes Noah's portrayal of him being Q-7) to lead a preemptive strike on Cerebral while Cerebral has Regeena's knockoff. However, Cerebral quickly realizes this and returns to Earth to steal his original back from Regeena. Betty takes the opportunity to take her role as Atomic Chick and disarm Dr. Cerebral; Cerebral is later beaten up by the legions of convention-goers. As for Noah, he intends to make the second issue of Atomic Chick, but abandons the idea after a horde of fans mobs him for "original sketches". (Villain: Dr. Cerebral)
64a	11a	"A Hard Day's Fight"	October 17, 2007	311a
Betty, Sparky, and X-5, as the band Jackamoose, finish a music video, to be shared only amongst themselves. However, Sparky decides to publish their music video (with an album cover reminiscent of Abbey Road), which becomes a massive hit. Admiral DeGill is shocked at a large group of intergalactic fans of Jackamoose converging on Moose Jaw, and orders Betty and company to fix the problem they've caused, as the fans may compromise the security of Galactic Guardian headquarters. To do so, they announce a farewell concert to be held in the school gymnasium. Maximus makes note of this, and notices that the music Jackamoose is playing was plagiarized. Arriving on Earth, Maximus, after a brief confrontation, convinces Betty of the truth; Sparky had indeed plagiarized Maximus' lyrics — it was a song that he knew as a child while watching Maximus perform the music on 3-V. Betty, however, is unconvinced that Maximus was the original author, so Maximus decides to perform the music himself, which causes the fans' attention to turn to Maximus. Maximus and Minimus make a hasty retreat, as they're chased away from Earth by their new fans. (Villain: Maximus IQ)
64b	11b	"If the Shoe Fits"	October 17, 2007	311b
Betty is ordered by Admiral DeGill to broker a peace agreement between the Galactic Guardians and an alien race. To ease communications, X-5 invents a translation box, allowing Betty to communicate with the alien race. However, she accidentally leaves the box at home, instead of taking a box with Sparky's disco shoes. Meanwhile, Purrsy toys with the box, and gains the ability to speak, freaking out Betty's mother. Back with the alien race, Betty discovers that she doesn't have the translation box with her, but Sparky reassures her that the treaty will be signed, having taken a course on how to speak the alien language. However, he makes a diplomatic faux pas when he tries to compliment the alien leader, and the two are forced to make a hasty retreat. Back home, Betty manages to round up Purrsy and gets X-5 to repair the machine to take away the ability to speak. Meanwhile, the aliens have found their way to Moose Jaw and are appearing to wreak havoc. Fortunately, X-5 manages to fix the translation box and use it on the alien race, and they discover that in their culture, compliments are taken as insults and vice versa, explaining Sparky's faux pas. Betty manages to parlay this fact into a new treaty, and the aliens leave Moose Jaw in peace.
65a	12a	"It Came from Hollywood"	October 18, 2007	312a
Betty discovers that everyone, including Chaz, Noah, Duncan, and the Osborne twins, is flocking to downtown Moose Jaw in an attempt to be cast as extras in a new Hollywood space flick, starring starlet Delta Aurora as a space heroine. Sparky also auditions, and wins the part of Aurora's sidekick, while X-5 and Betty (to her disdain, as she didn't audition) are put into crew roles (X-5 as a caterer and Betty as Aurora's gofer). As the filming progresses, Sparky accidentally discharges a real Galactic Guardian weapon (believing it to be a prop), destroying Maximus' citadel; Maximus believes it to be the work of the movie's villain, Ultimo, who, in the film, declares himself to be the supreme evil overlord. Unaware of the fact that Ultimo is merely a character in a film, Maximus arrives on Earth, intent on destroying Ultimo; Betty is forced to lock Aurora in her trailer and the actor portraying Ultimo in a porta-potty before having X-5 rig a prop spaceship to fly into outer space, luring Maximus away from Earth. With Maximus gone, the filming continues. (Villain: Maximus IQ)
65b	12b	"Lulu on the Loose"	October 18, 2007	312b
Noah's father has attracted a media circus over the appearance of crop circles on her farm, citing it as proof aliens living in Moose Jaw. Meanwhile, Beatrixo is showing her alien pet, Lulu, to Betty and her crew (including Noah). Lulu is an alien creature similar to a goat in appearance who Beatrixo had saved some time in the past, and had been living on Earth since; Lulu's walking pattern as she eats creates the crop circles. Beatrixo warns everyone that Lulu can't be exposed to direct sunlight, as it makes her "cranky" and changes her appearance into a larger green monster. After several encounters where Noah's father nearly discovers Lulu in her green form, only to have her revert into goat form by the time he can round up the media, Betty solicits the help of Admiral DeGill; he tells her that the only way to bring Lulu under control is if they find Lulu's mother. Borrowing the Century Warbler, Betty manages to find Lulu's mother using X-5's holographic camera, and the mother is brought back to Earth. As Noah's father makes another attempt at convincing the media that aliens exist, the reunited family are taken back home on the Century Warbler, as Noah's father is foiled once again; Betty having convinced the media that the crop circles are mere publicity stunts for her new band, the "Green Aliens From Outer Space".
66a	13a	"Betty and the Beast"	October 19, 2007	313a
An alien creature finds its way into Moosejaw Lake, and the town goes crazy trying to get a look at their very own lake monster: "Moosie". (Villain: "Moosie")
66b	13b	"Mirror of Morganna"	October 19, 2007	313b
An evil witch uses a powerful mirror to trap the townspeople and unleash their mirror opposites. It's up to Betty and Good Witch Penelope to save Moosejaw Heights. (Villain: Morgana)
67a	14a	"Love Bites"	January 7, 2008	314a
Maximus infects Betty with a love bug, and she instantly falls in love with Minimus. The bugs hitch a ride back to Earth, and the whole town erupts in Valentine's Day madness! (Villain: Maximus IQ)
67b	14b	"Zulia's New Beau"	January 7, 2008	314b
Sparky's mom, Zulia, has found another winning boyfriend: Plutor from the bad boys' gang The X-Rays. Zulia visits Sparky on Earth and brings trouble with her. (Villain: The X-Rays)
68a	15a	"Beach Blanket Betty"	January 8, 2008	315a
A powerful amulet turns Penelope into a supervillain named Lobsterella. Betty has to battle it out with the nastier than usual Penelope while trying to impress Chaz with her surfing. (Villain: Penelope Lang as Lobsterella)
68b	15b	"Ice Queen"	January 8, 2008	315b
Penelope invites Betty and Regeena to an exclusive spa in the Arctic. Icicle shows up and is furious to find the spa right where her favorite patch of ice used to be. (Villain: Iciclia)
69a	16a	"Bold Age"	January 9, 2008	316a
Maximus' grandfather, Max Sr. Sr. moves into the local retirement home and begins stealing youth from the citizens of Moosejaw Heights. Chaz and Penelope are in the line of fire while visiting their grandmother. (Villains: Maximus IQ, Max Sr., and Max Sr. Sr.)
69b	16b	"Cat Fight"	January 9, 2008	316b
Betty gets caught in the middle of two catfights: one between two flea-sized alien ambassadors and the other between her parents. (Villains: Malvoid and Femvoid)
70a	17a	"The Doomsday Game"	January 10, 2008	317a
Maximus is playing a killer game of croquet – literally! Earth is in danger of being knocked into the sun and all mayhem breaks lose when it looks like the end of the world is near. (Villain: Maximus IQ)
70b	17b	"Degill and Son"	January 10, 2008	317b
Admiral DeGill discovers he has a son with the evil Pontifadora. Bill DeGill is given free rein over Galactic Guardian headquarters, but is his loyalty to his newfound father, or Pontifadora, who is using him to discover the secret location of Galactic Guardian headquarters? (Villains: Pontifidora, Bombshelle, and Iciclia)
71a	18a	"Vaudevillains"	January 11, 2008	318a
While on a field trip to a local television station, the bus carrying Betty and Sparky is hijacked and taken to an intergalactic 3-V station. As Betty and Sparky realize what had happened, they discover the cause: the troll Mulock had kidnapped the bus so that Sparky could teach him a new comedy act, which would allow him to pass the audition phase of a Pop Idol-like competition. As Regeena takes the last open audition slot for the show (intending to give it to Betty so her band could audition), Penelope is recruited by a recruiter, who wants her to be part of a game show called Gorblack or No Gorblack (a parody of Deal or No Deal) as a suitcase model. Meanwhile, Sparky's efforts to teach Mulock is a failure and is only exasperated when X-5 (having arrived from Earth at Betty's request) criticizes Mulock for having poor comedic timing and poor delivery skills. An angry Mulock chases Betty and her crew through the 3-V station, which ends up with Betty taking the audition ticket that Regeena saved for her. Appearing on stage with Mulch, they manage to belt out a musical number (Muloch singing the odd phrase in Betty's place), which allows Muloch to pass the audition phase. The class is returned to Earth, but not before Penelope discovers that Gorblack or No Gorblack is really about whether the suitcase she was holding contained an alien; when it did, the alien proceeded to attempt to eat her; Penelope manages to escape, but is scarred by the ordeal. (Villain: Mulock the Troll)
71b	18b	"The Manchurian Guardian"	January 11, 2008	318b
While battling a group of blood monks on Morbidia, Sparky ingests a bowl of Buhdonkian pig snouts (his favorite snack), unaware that it contains a microchip that allows Maximus to remotely mind control Sparky; Maximus intends to use the mind-controlled Sparky to kill Betty. Meanwhile, Betty is nervous over a skateboarding stunt she has to do to kick off a town festival. X-5 assures her that her stunt, where she must do a series of hard tricks before setting off a series of fireworks in the air with a torch in her hand, will succeed; to ensure its success X-5 provides her with a magnetic glove (intended to keep the torch on her hand). That night, Maximus' plan is put into action, as he takes control of Sparky and has him take a restricted weapon. X-5, enjoying the festival from a distance, notices Sparky, and alerts Betty to the attempt on her life; Betty subsequently, while in the middle of the stunt, throws the glove at Sparky, knocking him out and destroying the microchips. Betty would complete her stunt without the assistance of the magnetic glove, while Sparky, recovering from a stomachache caused by the glove hitting him, accidentally discharges the weapon, sending rounds into the air which knock out Maximus' citadel, and adding to the fireworks show. (Villain: Maximus IQ) Note: The plot and the title are based on the novel The Manchurian Candidate.
72a	19a	"Elementary, My Dear Minimus"	January 14, 2008	319a
Betty is jealous of Chaz's best friend from a private school, Sam. Maximus gets his hands on Betty's drawings of Chaz and attempts to kidnap him for bait. (Villain: Maximus IQ)
72b	19b	"Great Eggspectations"	January 14, 2008	319b
Noah decides he's ready to go on a mission alone but winds up with more than he can handle after being double-crossed by the Collector on an egg hunt. (Villain: the Collector)
73a	20a	"Scent of a Blugo"	January 21, 2008	320a
A professional wrestling show arrives in Moose Jaw on "Minion Day", the day each year where Maximus acts as Minimus' underling. While at the show, Maximus unleashes a deadly Blugo on Betty using an unusual perfume. Our heroes tag-team it in the ring, all while Regeena cheers in the stands and Noah tries to distract her. (Villain: Maximus IQ)
73b	20b	"Star-Crossed Lovers"	January 21, 2008	320b
Star-crossed lovers from feuding kingdoms seek refuge with the Guardians after their parents forbid them to marry. Betty finds herself in a similar situation with Chaz. (Villain: Feuding families)
74a	21a	"Boot Camp Betty"	January 22, 2008	321a
Betty goes on a class camping trip to get a little R&R. Maximus decides his Blood Monks need a little boot camp training....on Earth. (Villain: Maximus IQ)
74b	21b	"A Finful of Dollars"	January 22, 2008	321b
Admiral Degill takes his crew on a much-needed vacation to Tumbleweed Gulch (a cross between the Alberta badlands and the Grand Canyon), but their peace and tranquility are interrupted by Hopper the Chopper on a quest for gold! (Villain: Hopper the Chopper)
75a	22a	"Invading Spaces"	January 23, 2008	322a
Betty must defend the people of Earth from becoming tacky Earthonian furnishings, and her bedroom from becoming a "Fuzzy Fushia Forest". (Villains: Modularians)
75b	22b	"Make a Wish"	January 23, 2008	322b
Atomic Roger accidentally gains the power to grant the wishes of one other person: Betty. With her secret thoughts coming true, Betty starts to lose her mind! (Villain: Atomic Roger)
76a	23a	"Fairytale Fate"	January 24, 2008	323a
Betty's class is assigned homework where they have to compose their own fairy tale. Later, Betty receives a package at Galactic Guardian headquarters, which Sparky discovers is a book by Milton Scrivener. Despite Betty's warnings that Scrivener's alter-ego, The Scribe, is dangerous, Sparky opens the book, which proceeds to suck up Betty, Sparky, X-5, and Noah. They discover that they're trapped inside the book, and each of the book's stories (ironically based on fairy tales such as Little Red Riding Hood and Rapunzel) ends with certain doom for Betty and the crew, either at the hands of The Scribe himself or one of the story's characters. Betty and the crew manage to take The Scribe's magical pencil (used to write the book), and Noah, who hates fairy tales, is tasked to use the pencil to alter the endings of each of the tales they encounter to escape The Scribe's trap. Eventually, Noah writes their way out of the book and force The Scribe back into the real world, where The Scribe is powerless; he's quickly apprehended by the heroes. (Villain: The Scribe)
76b	23b	"Ice Monsters"	January 24, 2008	323b
After being rejected for a local junior hockey team by the school coach for being a girl (over Chaz's objection, as he claims Betty is the best player on the team), Betty learns that the Ice Monsters, a traveling ice hockey team with a female goaltender, is making a stop in Moose Jaw to battle the local team, the Prairie Dogs. At the game, she realizes that, as the Prairie Dogs are literally being destroyed on the ice, that one of the Ice Monster players has a Morning star on his arm, raising Betty's suspicions that the Ice Monsters are in fact a group led by Iciclia and her minion Dingleberry. Determined to get to the root of Iciclia's plot, she (in civilian attire, which Iciclia doesn't recognize) challenges the Ice Monsters to a game, to be held that night. While the Ice Monsters accept, she's still short on players; Chaz, Penelope, Megan, and Sarah step up to assist (Penelope, who despises ice hockey, does so both as she believes to be a better skater than Betty, and to prevent Betty from spending time alone with Chaz), and "Coach DeGill" even puts in inspirational words for the ragtag team. During the game, X-5 discovers that Iciclia has rigged the icemaking equipment of every hockey rink on Earth to overload simultaneously at the end of the game; this would in turn freeze all of Earth. Meanwhile, Betty's ragtag team has held the game scoreless, largely due to Chaz's skill and Penelope's hard checking. Late in the game, Betty is captured between two Ice Monster players. As Iciclia gloats about her plan, Penelope and the Bangoons grab the puck and end up on a 4-on-0 breakaway; the Ice Monsters subsequently win the contest on the empty-net goal. Undaunted, the Ice Monsters set their plan in motion, only to discover that X-5 had turned the refrigeration unit into a sauna; Admiral DeGill easily apprehends them. Unfortunately, despite a job well done, Betty is still not allowed to be on the junior hockey team in the end. (Villain: Iciclia)
77a	24a	"The Way of the Weiner"	January 25, 2008	324a
Spindly Tam works with Noah at the local hotdog joint, teaching him the way of the Weiner, right before he's kidnapped by Maximus and the Betty Clones, the latter of which are framing Betty! (Villain: Maximus IQ and the Betty Clones)
77a	24b	"Pimplepalooza"	January 25, 2008	324b
The townsfolk have been infected by a plague of zits. Bombshelle is on a quest to rid the galaxy of these disgusting creatures, and her journey takes her directly to Atomic Betty's face. (Villain: Bombshelle)
78a	25a	"Noah's Bark"	January 28, 2008	325a
On the planet Canus Dogillia, Noah insults the inhabitants and is turned into a dog. He and Betty try to figure out who did it, while Noah's dad continues to try to find the location of Galactic Guardian Headquarters. (Villain: Maximus IQ)
78b	25b	"Queen for a Day"	January 28, 2008	325b
Queen Penelobee decides to relocate her evil hive to Earth and picks Galactic Guardian Headquarters as the perfect spot. Meanwhile, a Bangoon experiment with honey has rendered the Galactic Guardians' flash tubes inoperable, while Regeena and Duncan compete in an arcade game contest. (Villain: Queen Penelobee)
79	26	"The Future Is Now!"	January 29, 2008	326
It's Betty's thirteenth birthday, and Betty's family and friends are arranging a surprise birthday party. Meanwhile, after years of work, X-5 has managed to complete a working time machine. As a sign of the accomplishment, Admiral DeGill is ordered to present the time machine at the Galactic Council. However, this is a trap set by Maximus, who captures the time machine and travels into the future, with Sparky, X-5, Beatrixo, and Admiral DeGill as hostages. A downcast Betty and Noah, both having eluded capture, return to Betty's birthday party, where a hand-me-down "re-gift" from Penelope inspires her to repair a prototype time machine (its only flaw being that it turned its occupants into gelatin) to full working order and travel to the future. Betty and Noah arrive in the year 2013 to find a dystopic Moose Jaw Heights. Maximus has taken control of Earth, and the Galactic Guardians have been reduced to a small pocket of resistance, consisting of the seventeen-year-old Atomic Betty as well as teenage future versions of Noah, Chaz, Regeena, and even Penelope; all who know of Betty having been a dutiful and strong Galactic Guardian for several years. After the prototype time machine is destroyed, the Galactic Guardians of the present and future launch an attack against Maximus in his Earth stronghold on Beatrixo's farm in a bid to capture the original time machine, which results in their own capture. After gloating that the four present-day hostages are scattered around the universe, the present Betty manages to trick Maximus into "repairing" his time machine (ostensibly to prevent motion sickness by its occupants), before a timely distraction by the future Penelope allows Betty and Noah to take the time machine themselves and travel back to the past. Back in the present, Betty convinces X-5 to present the flawed prototype instead of the working model, and the others of Maximus' impending trap. The better-equipped Galactic Guardians manage to drive off Maximus, but Maximus manages to capture the prototype time machine. When he tries to use it, it predictably fails, turning him and Minimus into green gelatin. Meanwhile, Betty, Noah, and Beatrixo return to the birthday party, where their secret is accidentally leaked to Penelope (on a note written by the future teenage Penelope planted on Noah's clothing), who simply believes the galactic secret to be a fabrication and thinks that Betty will always be nothing but a loser. After Penelope leaves, Betty is relieved and calls her teenage future self, wishing her a happy birthday and thanking her for everything. Future teenage Atomic Betty also wishes Betty a happy birthday and hopes to talk to her soon. After the call, Betty is then joined by her friends and family, all of whom share a laugh. (Villain: Maximus IQ) Note: This is the series finale.

==== Ending sketches ====
In addition to the two short episodes, each episode ends with a short sketch. Regular sketches include:

- Crash Test Noah – Noah is put into testing the latest Galactic Guardian equipment by X-5, which inevitably goes wrong.
- Sparky and Minimus: Moose Jaw Undercover – Sparky and Minimus pose as undercover police officers in a tribute to Starsky and Hutch.
- Sparky vs. Minimus – Sparky and Minimus compete to see who is better at a particular task.
- The DeGill Show – Admiral DeGill is the host of a late-night talk show series. The sketch is a tribute to the Late Show with David Letterman.

No.	Title	After
1	"Sparky & X-5: Prank'd"	"No Space Like Home"
X-5 captures a video of Sparky in the shower.
2	"Elevator Traitor"	"Family Feuds" / "Girl Power"
Maximus and Minimus attempt to destroy Betty and her crew by posing as pizza deliverymen and planting a bomb in a pizza. However, they're foiled when one of X-5's inventions suddenly activates in an elevator they're all in, switching the pizza box with a bucket of food Sparky was carrying.
3	"Crash-Test Noah: Body Snatchers"	"Arr! It is 'olidays!" / "Rodeo Robots"
Noah tests a machine that can read the minds of the Bangoons. The machine works, but Noah is mortified at what he sees.
4	"Sparky vs. Minimus: Who Can Pick Up the Most Girls?"	"Who's the Baby Now?" / "Spliced"
Sparky's attempts at being a ladies' man fail after being punched out by Penelope, while Minimus wins by literally catching Penelope and Regeena in a net.
5	"Atomic Betty Auditions"	"April Fools Overture" / "Crimes of Fashion"
Sparky auditions for the role of "Sparky" for Atomic Betty
6	"Galactic Idol"	"The Big Dig" / "Wedding Crashers"
At Galactic Idol, Maximus performs as three musicians with his terrible singing.
7	"The DeGill Show: Stupid Alien Tricks"	"Night of the Living Mummies" / "Trick or Creep"
Maximus is the special guest, where he coerces Minimus to turn his body around instead of his head.
8	"Sparky and Minimus: Moosejaw Undercover"	"Roger, Where Are You?" / "Betty the Red"
Sparky and Minimus show that they are the masters of disguise.
9	"Sparky vs. Minimus: Who's The Best Rapper?"	"Mini-Maximus" / "Circus Sparkimus"
Sparky, accompanied by Betty and X5, raps about his life as a Galactic Guardian, while Minimus, accompanied by Pontifidora and Infantor, rap about being an underling. Sparky wins after Minimus manages to offend Maximus in one of his lines.
10	"Fool House"	"Shake Your Booga" / "Cosmic Comicon"
Admiral DeGill, Sparky, Maximus, and Minimus are engaged in a card game. X-5, the dealer, is forced to eject Maximus and Minimus after they're caught cheating.
11	"Crash-Test Noah: Animal In-Stinks"	"A Hard Day's Fight" / "If the Shoe Fits"
Noah tests a collar that allows the wearer to adopt the mannerisms of any animal.
12	"The DeGill Show: Infantor"	"It Came from Hollywood" / "Lulu on the Loose"
The special guest is Infantor, who, when he tries to threaten DeGill, is sent packing by X-5, who had disguised himself as the chair that Infantor had been sitting on.
13	"Sparky and Minimus: Moosejaw Undercover: Diffuse it!"	" Betty and the Beast" / "Mirror of Morganna"
Sparky and Minimus are at Betty's house, appearing at first glance to disarm an explosive device. However, when Betty enters, she's shocked by their actual work of giving Betty's mother a "Moose Jaw Undercover Makeover".
14	"Bizarre Love Triangle"	"Love Bites" / "Zulia's New Beau"
Betty arrives to see Sparky, X-5, and Admiral DeGill watch a webcam video of Noah in one of his romantic fantasies and subsequently laugh at her. A mortified Betty, in response, strands the three in outer space.
15	"Hairballs in History"	" Beach Blanket Betty"/"Ice Queen"
Purrsy explains the historical significance of the hairball in architecture.
16	"Crash-Test Noah: Flight Simulator"	"Bold Age"/"Cat Fight"
As part of his cadet training, Noah takes on a flight simulator and promptly faints from the high-velocity travel.
17	"Sparky vs. Minimus: Who's The Most Extreme?"	"The Doomsday Game" / "Degill and Son"
Sparky and Minimus compete in a series of extreme sports events, which all end in a tie. Minimus concedes defeat when he's forced off of a skydiving plane without a parachute. Unfortunately, Sparky's parachute gets caught in a tree branch hanging from a cliff, which makes Minimus the winner.
18	"Crash-Test Noah: Super Flash"	"Vaudevillains" / "The Manchurian Guardian"
Noah tests a new gadget, the Sound Breaker, a belt that gives him enhanced speed. However, his pants promptly fall off when he takes the belt off, and he runs at an even faster speed to cover himself.
19	"Sparky and Minimus: Moosejaw Undercover: Stakeout"	"Elementary, My Dear Minimus" / "Great Eggspectations"
Sparky and Minimus are at a stakeout, where they're spying on Betty's slumber party. However, Betty and Regeena catch them when they make too much noise.
20	"Crash-Test Noah: Body Snatchers Part 2"	"Scent of a Blugo" / "Star-Crossed Lovers"
Noah tests a new prototype of the Bangoon mind-reading machine. However, the machine switches the bodies of Noah and X-5 instead. Noah takes the opportunity to exact revenge.
21	"Hairball Haute Coutre"	"Boot Camp Betty" / "A Finful of Dollars"
Purrsy explains why the hairball has always been in fashion.
22	"Sparky vs. Minimus: Who's The Better Dancer?"	"Invading Spaces" / "Make a Wish"
Sparky and Minimus dance-off at a nightclub in Moose Jaw. Both tires out from exhaustion and the contest is declared a tie.
23	"Strength Training"	"Fairytale Fate" / "Ice Monsters"
While strength training, Noah ingests a fruit that grants temporary super strength. However, the fruit wears off as he is lifting a heavy object.
24	"Crash-Test Noah: Static Spy"	"The Way of the Weiner" / "Pimplepalooza"
Noah tests out a spy suit that uses static cling to stick to walls and ceilings, only to be trapped within a TV show.
25	"Sparky and Minimus: Moosejaw Undercover: Car Chase"	"Noah's Bark"/"Queen for a Day"
Sparky and Minimus are ordered by Admiral DeGill to chase after a thief. The thief turns out to be X-5, who had stolen a box of donuts as a protest against their high trans-fat content.
26	"Crash Test Noah: Unmasked"	"The Future Is Now"
Noah tests out a mask that allows its user to assume every face he/she can think of, but Betty mistook him for an alien criminal.

== See also ==
- Atomic Betty
