= Euchontha moyobamba =

Scientific classification
- Kingdom: Animalia
- Phylum: Arthropoda
- Clade: Pancrustacea
- Class: Insecta
- Order: Lepidoptera
- Superfamily: Noctuoidea
- Family: Notodontidae
- Genus: Euchontha
- Species: E. moyobamba

Binomial name
- Euchontha moyobamba Miller, 1989

Species of moth

Euchontha moyobamba is a moth of the family Notodontidae first described by James S. Miller in 1989. It is found in Peru.
