= Atomic Betty =

Animated science fiction television series

- From left to right: Sparky, Betty, and X-5.
- Also known as: Atomic Betty: Mission Earth (season 3)
- Genre: Science fantasy Sci-fi comedy Superhero; Action-adventure
- Created by: Trevor Bentley; Mauro Casalese; Rob Davies; Olaf Miller
- Developed by: Kevin Gillis
- Voices of: Tajja Isen; Rick Miller; Bruce Hunter; Colin Fox; Len Carlson (seasons 1–2); Dwayne Hill (season 3); Adrian Truss
- Theme music composer: Jack Lenz; Kevin Gillis
- Opening theme: "Atomic Betty Theme" by Tajja Isen
- Ending theme: "Atomic Betty Theme Remix"
- Composer: Lenz Entertainment
- Countries of origin: Canada; France
- Original languages: English; French
- No. of seasons: 3
- No. of episodes: 79 (156 segments) (list of episodes)

Production
- Executive producers: Ira Levy; Peter Williamson; Kevin Gillis; Trevor Bentley; Philippe Alessandri; Simone Halberstadt Harari; Steven Hecht
- Producers: Edward Peghin; Kevin Gillis; Bob Davies; Virginie Jallot
- Running time: 22 minutes; 11 minutes (segments); 60 minutes (The No L-9 special)
- Production companies: Atomic Cartoons (Note: As A Betty Productions (BC) Inc. (season 1), A Betty 2 Productions (BC) Inc. (season 2), or A Betty 3 Productions (BC) Inc. (season 3)); Breakthrough Entertainment (Note: As A Betty Productions Inc. (season 1), A Betty 2 Productions Inc. (season 2), or A Betty 3 Productions Inc. (season 3)); Tele Images Kids; Marathon Group (season 3)

Original release
- Network: Teletoon (Canada); M6 (France, seasons 1–2); Télétoon (Note: Not related to the Canadian channels owned by Corus Entertainment (Teletoon and Télétoon)) (France, season 3)
- Release: August 29, 2004 – January 29, 2008

Atomic Betty (retitled Atomic Betty: Mission Earth for its third and final season) is an animated television series produced by Atomic Cartoons, Breakthrough Entertainment, and Tele Images Kids, along with the Marathon Group joining for the third season. Additional funding for production is provided by Teletoon in Canada, Phil Roman Entertainment (uncredited) in the U.S. and M6 (seasons 1–2) and Télétoon+ (season 3) in France.

In Canada, the show originally aired on Teletoon from August 29, 2004, to January 29, 2008, lasting for three years. In France, the series aired on M6 from 2004 until 2005 and then on Télétoon+ from 2006 until 2008. From the U.S., this series premiered on Cartoon Network on September 17, 2004, until January 1, 2006, and The Hub (now known as "Discovery Family") from 2010 until October 14, 2011, along with its third and final season.

== Synopsis ==
Betty Barrett is a typical girl living in Moose Jaw Heights (a fictional suburb of Moose Jaw, Saskatchewan) who enjoys school, daydreaming about living in outer space, sci-fi movies, and singing in her band. Unknown to all of her friends and family, however, she is also a member of the Galactic Guardians, an elite team dedicated to interstellar crime-fighting and law enforcement. As "Atomic Betty", assisted by her two allies, the alien pilot Sparky and a robot named X-5, she confronts the evil overlord Maximus I.Q. and his servant Minimus, as well as other intergalactic supervillains and criminals. Despite being rather unassuming on Earth, Atomic Betty is a superstar throughout the galaxy and even has a crowd of people who consider her their role model.

In each episode, a crisis occurs somewhere in the galaxy, usually while Betty is spending time with her friends and family. Invariably, her bracelet starts beeping, and she runs off alone to save the galaxy in her superpowered Galactic Guardian battle suit, which allows her to use a wide variety of weapons and gadgets. Accompanied by her crew, Betty takes initiative to fight the villains before returning home and explaining her absence.

== Characters ==
- Betty Barrett/Atomic Betty (voiced by Tajja Isen) is the titular protagonist of the series, a 12-year-old tomboy who moonlights as the Galactic Guardian Atomic Betty. Betty is skilled at hand-to-hand combat, kickboxing, karate and blade-to-blade combat, but is also equipped with a wide variety of Galactic Guardian-issued bracelet, housing a communications device and remote controls for her spaceship and its teleporter, as well as an array of gadgets and weapons. Her bracelet also has a holographic disguise function and grants her basic telekinesis.
- Tanya Barrett (voiced by Kristina Nicoll) is Betty Barrett's mother and spouse to Quincy Barrett. She is a homemaker who is largely oblivious to her daughter's adventures, as she spends most of her life fussing over her pet cat, Purrsy. Betty's mother dresses like a hairstylist, but her normal skills at hairstyling are best left unseen. She usually gets Betty to do things that she dislikes. She tries to discourage Betty's interest in space comics and movies and sports because she thinks Betty is too old and she will never get a boyfriend, but her attempts failed. She tries to make her daughter be more like her which Betty would refuse to do what she wants.
- Quincy Barrett (voiced by Patrick McKenna) is the father of Betty Barrett and husband to Tanya Barrett. He resembles a slightly absent-minded, stereotypical 1950s salesman who is usually busy with whatever new gadget he is trying to sell, but he remains a devoted father when he's around. Unlike his wife, he lets Betty be herself and encourages her interest in space, comics, and movies; however, more like his wife, he tries to get Betty to do some things she isn't interested in.
- Sparky (voiced by Rick Miller) is Betty's alien lieutenant and pilot. Although he is sometimes reckless, and often more interested in eating, surfing, or girls than the mission he is on, he is nevertheless very loyal to Betty and endeavors to do his best at all times.
- X-5 (voiced by Bruce Hunter) is a rectangular, yellow, hovering robot. He tends to spout too much information at inopportune times and takes things exceptionally seriously, which usually grates on Sparky's nerves. The two of them have a grudgingly respectful working relationship.
- Maximus I.Q. (voiced by Colin Fox) is a Siamese cat-like alien overlord and the archenemy of the Galactic Guardians.
- Minimus P.U. (voiced by Len Carlson in the first and second seasons, Dwayne Hill in the third season) is a cat-like alien who serves Maximus I.Q. He has two faces, with the first being kinder and subservient and the second being more malevolent.
- Admiral DeGill (voiced by Adrian Truss) is a fish-like alien and a founding member of the Galactic Guardians. He serves as Betty's superior, assigning her to missions.
- Noah Parker (voiced by Laurie Elliott) is Betty's best friend.
- Penelope Lang (voiced by Catherine Disher) is Betty's Chinese Canadian rival on Earth. She is an arrogant and self-obsessed queen bee, who thinks of herself as the most popular prima donna at her school.
- Megan (voiced by Stephanie Morgenstern) is one of the two of Penelope's "minions" and the shortest and youngest of the trio, she's a chubby little girl with short puffy dirty blond hair and hazel eyes. She might be nasty or bratty, but she is known to be very complimentary towards anyone too.
- Sarah (voiced by Catherine Disher) is Penelope and Megan's friend. She is of Southeast Asian descent. She is also the nicest of the three. She is also friendly and playful.
- Chaz Lang (voiced by Scott McCord) is Penelope's brother and Betty's crush.

== Episodes ==
Season	Segments	Episodes	Originally released	
Season	Segments	Episodes	First released	Last released
1	52	26	August 29, 2004	January 22, 2005
2	53	27	October 7, 2005	June 23, 2006
3	52	26	September 28, 2007	January 29, 2008

== Development ==
Atomic Betty was the first original series for Atomic Cartoons, which was founded in Vancouver in 1999 and had until then worked only as an animation service provider. Studio co-founder Trevor Bentley said the studio began developing the show shortly after it launched with one service client, and the title character was named after the studio which still treats her as its mascot.

The property was conceived by Atomic Cartoons founders Trevor Bentley, Mauro Casalese, Rob Davies and Olaf Miller and developed with Breakthrough Films & Television and Fresh Produce. The producers described it as a joint venture of Breakthrough's Ira Levy and Peter Williamson, Fresh Produce partners Kevin Gillis and Steven Hecht, the Atomic Cartoons founders, and Phil Roman of Phil Roman Entertainment. In October 2002, Teletoon Canada ordered 13 half-hour episodes and the series was offered for presales at the MIPCOM market that year. The series was funded with the participation of the Shaw Fund and the Canadian Television Fund.

== Production ==
Atomic Cartoons, based in Vancouver, British Columbia, wrote the scripts and produced the animation for the show using Adobe Flash. Tele Images Kids produced animation and voice direction for the French-language version of the show. Breakthrough Entertainment, a sister company of Breakthrough Films & Television, was the series' worldwide distributor outside Canada, and Warner Home Video held worldwide home video rights. LUK Internacional distributed the show in Spain and Portugal.

Three seasons of the show were produced, totaling 78 half-hour or 156 quarter-hour episodes, depending on the format shown in each market. There is also a one-hour Christmas special titled Atomic Betty: The No-L 9. The first season had a budget of $9 million.

== Telecast and home media ==
Atomic Betty premiered on Teletoon in Canada on August 29, 2004. The series was formerly aired on Cartoon Network from September 17, 2004, until January 1, 2006, in the U.S. and The Hub (now known as "Discovery Family") from October 10, 2010, until October 12, 2011. It first aired on CITV in the United Kingdom on November 1, 2004, the show continued to broadcast and then re-broadcast on CITV until it was effectively taken off schedule after 6–7 years sometime in 2011. Starz Kids and Family formerly picked up the series, but only for its first season because the second and third kinds were too expensive for the Starz brand to afford until it was later removed from its weekday morning lineup. Recently, Kartoon Channel, a web-based cartoon streaming channel, is now airing all three seasons of the show. It also aired repeats in Canada on Cartoon Network until 2015 and BBC Kids until the channel was closed in 2018.

Warner Home Video (sister company to the show's American broadcaster Cartoon Network) released two DVD volumes of the show on October 18, 2005, in Region 1 and February 6, 2006, in Japan. Each release contained eight segment-episodes from the first season. In the other two volumes, Betty Powers Up! and Betty Blasts Off! were planned but cancelled.

DVD title	Season(s)	Episode count	Release date
Betty, Set, Go!	1	8	October 18, 2005
The season 1 compilation contained "Toxic Talent", "Spindly Tam Kanushu", "Atomic Roger", "Furball for the Sneeze", "The Really Big Game", "But the Cat Came Back", "The Doppelganger", and "The Incredible Shrinking Betty". Bonus features include: "Toughest Chick in the Alien World" Atomic Betty Theme music video.
Betty to the Rescue!	1	8	October 18, 2005
The season 1 compilation contained "Maximus Displeasure", "Cosmic Cake", "The Attack of the Evil Baby", "Crass Menagerie", "The Trouble with Triplets", "The Substitute", "Infantor Rules", and "Best (Mis)Laid Plans". Bonus features include: "I Remember When", an animated interview where Maximus and Minimus discuss Atomic Betty.

== Reception ==
Atomic Betty received positive-to-mixed reviews from critics and audiences, but has since gained a cult following.

Emily Ashby of Common Sense Media gave the show a rate of four stars out of five, saying that the show is "equal opportunity exists" and "[it] ups the ante on its TV peers by including some worthwhile messages as well." She also said that of the show's content is "nothing worrisome for its intended kid audience, aside from some mild potty humor and a smattering of brief scuffles between Betty's team and the bad guys. In the end, though, none of these minor blemishes tarnish the show's greatest asset -- its respectable heroine." Anita Gates of The New York Times says that "Atomic Betty has all the requisite video-game-speed action, and its psychological and sociological lessons range from healthy to benign. The only unfortunate message is in the villain's full name: Supreme Overlord Maximus I.Q. So much for a positive attitude toward intelligence." The Encyclopedia of Science Fiction described the series as a competent, lively children's show with a feisty heroine, though less entertaining for adults than contemporaries such as My Life as a Teenage Robot and Kim Possible; it judged the third season the strongest, with more emphasis on humour and the Galactic Guardians' headquarters moved to Betty's hometown. A planned sequel series, Atomic Betty Redux is set five years later but was never produced.

=== Accolades ===
By 2010, Atomic Betty had been sold to 180 countries and nominated 11 times for various awards, including a Gemini Award win for best ensemble performance in an animated series and a BAFTA nomination for best international children's production.

== Merchandise ==
=== Soundtrack ===
Atomic Betty

Soundtrack album by Tajja Isen
- Released: November 8, 2005
- Recorded: 2004
- Genres: Pop, electronica
- Length: 33:32
- Label: Koch

Atomic Betty is the official soundtrack to the television series of the same name. It was released by Koch Records (now MNRK Music Group) on November 8, 2005, and contains some tracks performed by the title character of the show, Betty Barrett, voiced by actress/singer Tajja Isen. She wrote and recorded that album in 2004. As of 2017, the album is still available on iTunes and Amazon.

No.	Title	Length
1.	"Atomic Betty Theme Song"	2:25
2.	"Supersonic Tronic Kinda Girl"	4:09
3.	"Alien Ball (Do The Betty!)"	3:22
4.	"Dog Star Sirius"	2:30
5.	"A Feeling Called Love"	4:47
6.	"Hold On"	3:53
7.	"Back In Space"	2:01
8.	"This Cat Is Coming After You"	3:19
9.	"That's What I Do"	4:12
10.	"Don't Surrender"	4:14

=== Video games ===
A video game based on the show developed by Big Blue Bubble was released for the Game Boy Advance in Europe on August 25, 2005, and in North America on October 25, 2005. A Java game for mobile phones, titled Atomic Betty - Part 1, was developed by GlobalFun and Breakthrough New Media and published in 2010.

=== Dolls and action figures ===
Hong Kong-based toy company Playmates Toys was chosen during the initial run of the Atomic Betty TV show in Canada to produce a coinciding toy line. The toy line included a variety of Betty Barrett character dolls (made of rubber, cloth, nylon and silicone), which featured both her iconic pink-and-white dress, and her normal outfit, along with a yellow sweater and green skirt. The dolls featured nylon hair that could be brushed and styled, similar to popular fashion dolls at the time, such as Mattel's Barbie and Bratz. A "Talking Betty Doll" was released in 2004, which would say the character's catchphrase "Atomic Betty, reporting for duty!" when a button on its belly was pressed. The doll was powered by AAA batteries and featured the same nylon hair as the smaller versions of the doll had. Other toys by Playmates included small plastic figurines of major supporting characters, and a large plastic "Transforming Star Cruiser" that certain Betty dolls could fit into and ride in. Outside of Canada, UK-based toy company Character produced a line of Betty Barrett dolls for British audiences, releasing a television commercial on CITV to advertise the dolls in 2005. Character's doll line was very similar to the Playmates doll line, but Character only made dolls of Betty, not any supporting characters. Accessories included a plastic playhouse, which was styled similarly to the house that Betty lived in on the series.
