= Lucius Marcius Memor =

Lucius Marcius Memor was a Roman haruspex who made a dedicatory offering at the shrine of Aquae Sulis, now Bath, England. Memor's altar can still be seen at the archaeological site of Bath. Its text reads "Deae Suli • Lucius Marcius Memor, Haruspex, D[ono] D[edit]" ("To the goddess Sulis, Lucius Marcius Memor, Haruspex, gave this as a gift"). Memor hailed from northern Italy.

The historical Memor is used as the basis for a character in the Cambridge Latin Course published by Cambridge University Press.
