= Belgian railway signalling =

Belgian railway signalling is the signalling in effect on the Belgian rail network currently operated by Infrabel.

== Types of movement ==
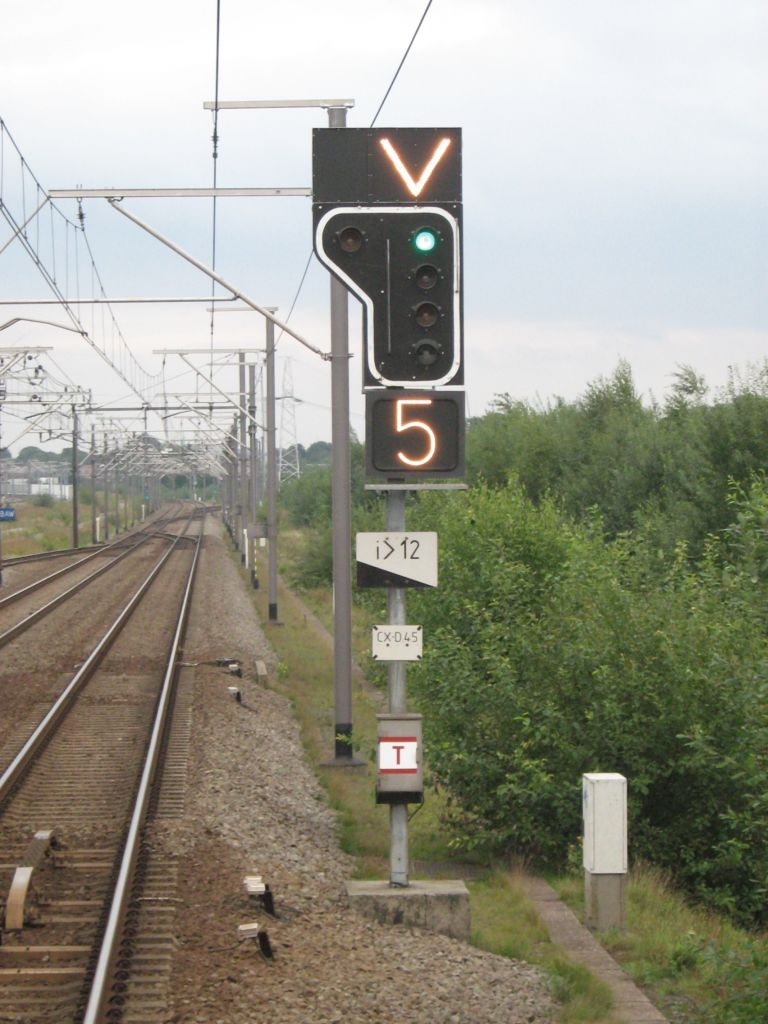
Counter-flow track signal with a chevron and a speed restriction display (5 ⇒ 50 km/h). After this signal, the train will drive under normal track regime and cross back to the left track at 50km/h

In Belgium, there are two types of train movement:

- Major movement (e.g. mainline operation) which occurs during normal operation (traffic moves at the speed permitted by the signalling and regulations);
- Minor movement (e.g. shunting) which is done by driving by sight and never faster than 40 km/h (25 mph).

The change from one movement to the other is done by signals (mainly stop signals) or a written order.

The first movement (which is always executed as minor movement) happens in the following situations:

- a driver taking over a new train
- a change in driver's cab or direction of travel
- receipt, change or removal of train number
- vehicles that can drive on themselves are coupled or uncoupled
- when permission is needed to continue to drive after an incident
- when beginning to shunt

Within major movement, there are two regimes, linked to bi-directional operation on double track lines:

- normal track regime: the signals are located on the left of the track. However, in some cases, the configuration of the environment precludes placing signs on the left track. They are then placed on the right and have an arrow (white arrow on a blue disc).
- counter-flow track regime: the signals are located on the right of the track and the aspects are blinking.

The most common way of regime change is by displaying a chevron (V-shaped) sign on a main stop sign (single or combined).

In minor movement, all signals are to be obeyed, both those of the left hand track and the right hand; signals controlling only minor movements are placed on the left. In counter-flow operation, some signals (light or otherwise) are specifically dedicated to minor movements and therefore are ignored by the trains travelling in major movement.

== Light signals ==
The lights are designed and arranged to be visible from a distance (up to two kilometres on a clear day). For this they are equipped with lenses to focus light rays emitted by the bulb, which can be selected and reasonable power. That is why the lights do not seem very intense when viewed from the side while they light up sharply in normal line of vision i.e. in the direction of arrival of the train.

Note that the yellow lights often are orange in reality.

=== Plain stop signal ===
The red aspect requires a halt for both major and minor movements. It can be opened for major movement (green when the track gives access to a mainline, or double yellow in stations) or minor movement (red + white). It gives no information about the aspect of the next signal.

A white number below the main aspect restricts the speed (from the first switch or track junction after the signal).

Above the main aspect, the signal can show a chevron (to change the regime), or a "U" (when the train is led towards a dead end).

It can be mounted on a mast or gantry (above the track).

=== Warning signal ===
A warning signal describes the state of the following stop signal. It may present a yellow number above the signal with the main aspects green-yellow horizontal and green-yellow vertical and thus the speed (in tens of km/h) with respect to the next signal.

=== Combined main stop signal ===
This type of signal serves as both a stop signal and a warning signal and can therefore, according to the needs of the position, present aspects of both a plain stop signal and a warning signal. This type of signal is the most common one on the mainline network.

=== Simplified stop signal ===
It can either be placed at ground level or elevated (on a post).

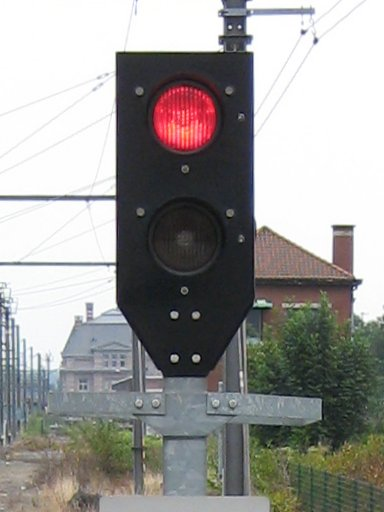
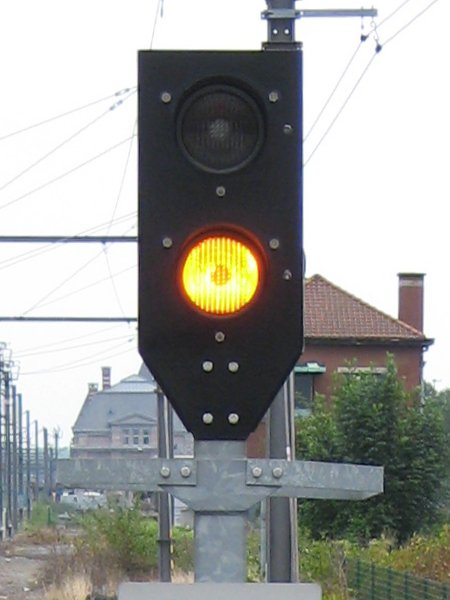
Simplified stop signal displaying 'halt' (red)	Red aspect: trains in both major and minor movements must halt.
Simplified stop signal displaying 'track clear' (yellow)	Yellow aspect: allows trains in major and minor movement to proceed (but doesn't transform the movement type). It does not give any information about the aspect of the next signal.

=== Small stop signal ===
Triangle with a black base and two horizontal white lights	The halt aspect applies only to minor movements.
black triangle on base with two white lights placed diagonally to one another	This aspect allows minor movement.

This type of signal is placed on the ground.

An older version of the small stop signal has the appearance of the simplified signal above, but with a purple instead of a red light.

=== Completed operations indicator (IOT) ===
The Completed operations indicator is a system composed of a set of switches (activation) and light signals (display) on platforms of most stations and allows the guard to announce to the driver (conductor) that the procedure for boarding is completed and the train can start.

Where the system is installed, the yellow aspect (or white on older systems) is a prerequisite for the departure of passenger trains.

=== Aspects displayed by major stop signals and warning signals ===
Normal operation (left-hand running)	Explanation	Opposite track operation (right-hand running)
or	Green: passage is permitted at full speed; the next signal is another signal open in large movement without restrictions (i.e. yellow or green thus indicating a clear track) or a warning signal.	or
	Double yellow: passage is permitted at full speed, but the next stop signal is set to red/red-white (see below), or the signal does not know the state of the next signal. The driver must drive as if the next stop signal is a red signal.	
or	Red: passage is not permitted and the train must halt. If the signal is managed by a signal box, the driver cannot pass without permission from the signal box. If the red signal is displayed on an automatic signal it warns for an occupied block section ahead or a level crossing that is experiencing technical difficulties. The driver will stop, write down the incident on their journey report and will proceed at sight.	or
	Green-yellow horizontal: allows passage at full speed, but the next signal requires a speed reduction. This speed may be indicated by number displayed on a yellow display at the top otherwise a black number on a white triangle can be affixed to the mast signal: it is the smallest speed that may be imposed by the next signal. If there is no indication, the driver must assume a speed of 40 km/h (25 mph).	
	Green-yellow vertical: allows the passage at full speed and warns of a short section: the distance between the signal following and that follows is shorter than the distance normally required to perform the action required .	
or	Red-white: allows the passage under "minor movement" (the train must change the type of movement if it was "major movement"). The track behind the signal is occupied, leads to a dead end, or the next signal is at red (not red-white) and is at an abnormally reduced distance (less than 370 metres (1,210 ft))	or

== Signs ==
=== Speed signs ===
Permanent	Explanation	Temporary
	Announcement sign: indicates a speed restriction ahead (in tens of km/h). The train has to slow down to this speed. For example, the speed in the example signs on the sides indicate a speed of 90 kilometres per hour (56 mph), not 9 kilometres per hour (5.6 mph).	
	Origin sign: marks the beginning of a speed restricted zone. The number is the same as the announcement sign above. Sometimes the number is not present and a plain black circle is used instead.	
	End of zone sign: after passing this sign the train can accelerate to the speed indicated (in tens of km/h).: The version shown above is used when the speed limit is less than the reference speed limit of the line.; The version shown below may be placed between an announcement sign and an origin sign to allow acceleration when another track with a lower speed limit joins the track that had the announcement sign.	
	Reference speed sign: after passing this sign the train can accelerate to the reference speed limit of the line, which is the speed indicated (in tens of km/h).	

Additional panels (special triangles, for example) are used to indicate that only certain types of trains are affected: e.g., "HKM" means the sign only concerns freight trains .

=== Other signs ===
Control reference line: indicate on what line a train is headed on.
Catenary end sign: indicates the end of a zone powered by overhead wire. Electric trains must halt.
'Expect lower pantograph': Warns of an upcoming lowered pantograph signal.
'Lower Pantograph': indicates a zone with a lowered pantograph signal.
'Raise pantograph': end of zone in which pantograph(s) had to be lowered.

== Other signals ==
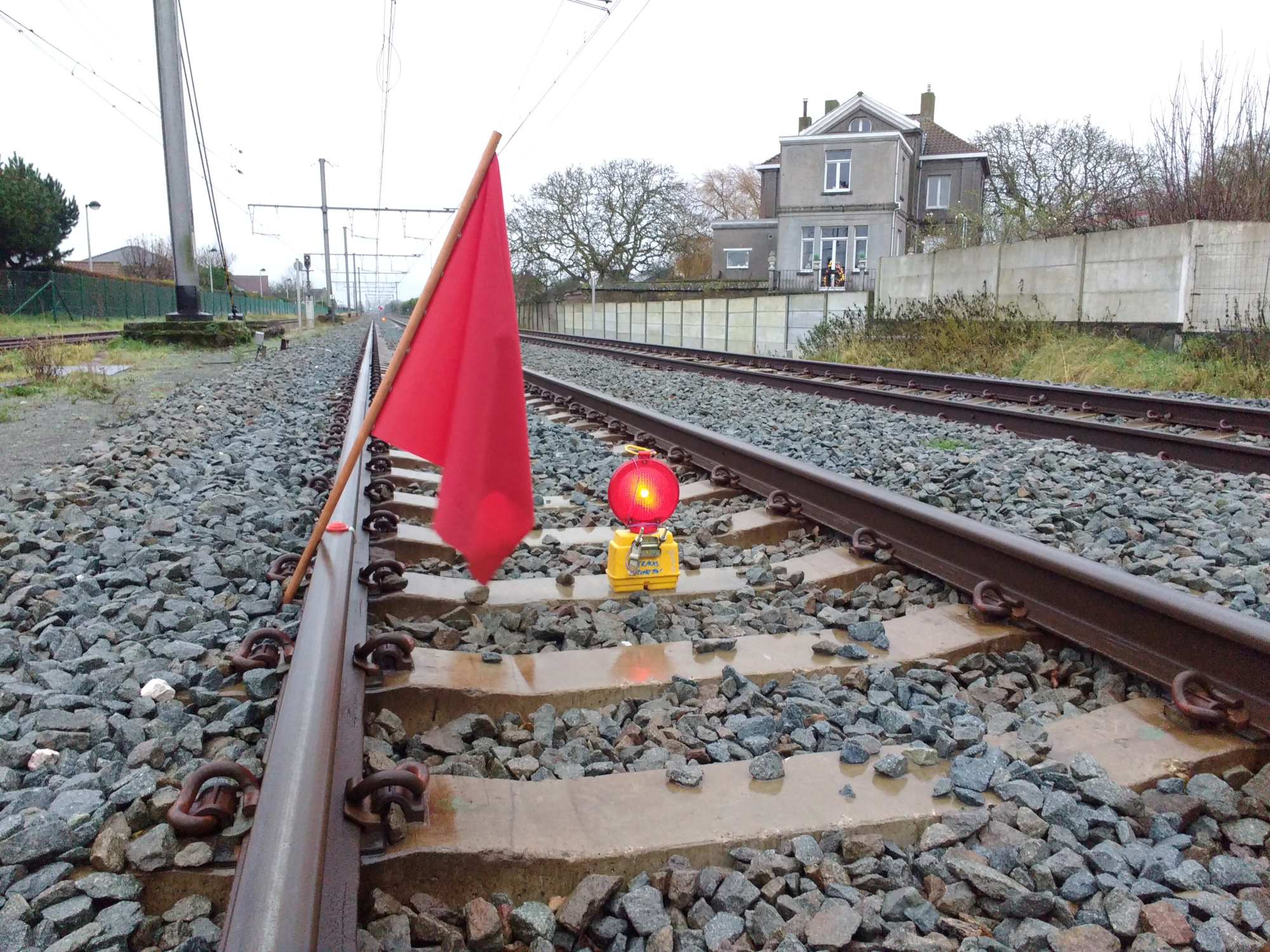
Mobile signals

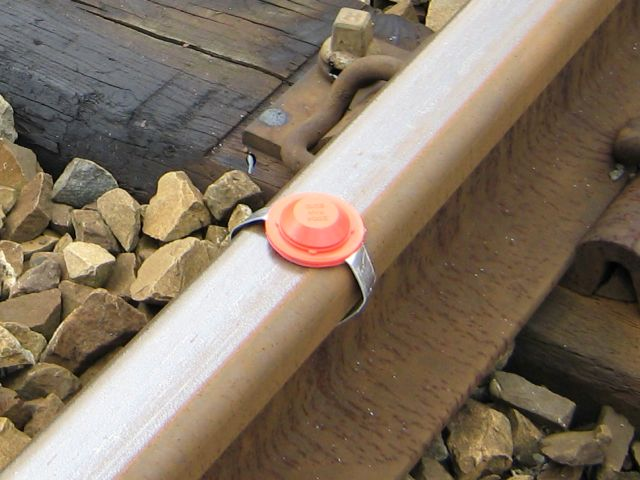
A detonator

Other signals complement the fixed signs:

- Mobile signals (light at night / low visibility, flag day) red, yellow and green;
- Acoustic signals (detonators, horns);
- Torch flame red lights flashing (these require a train to halt);

== Cab signalling ==
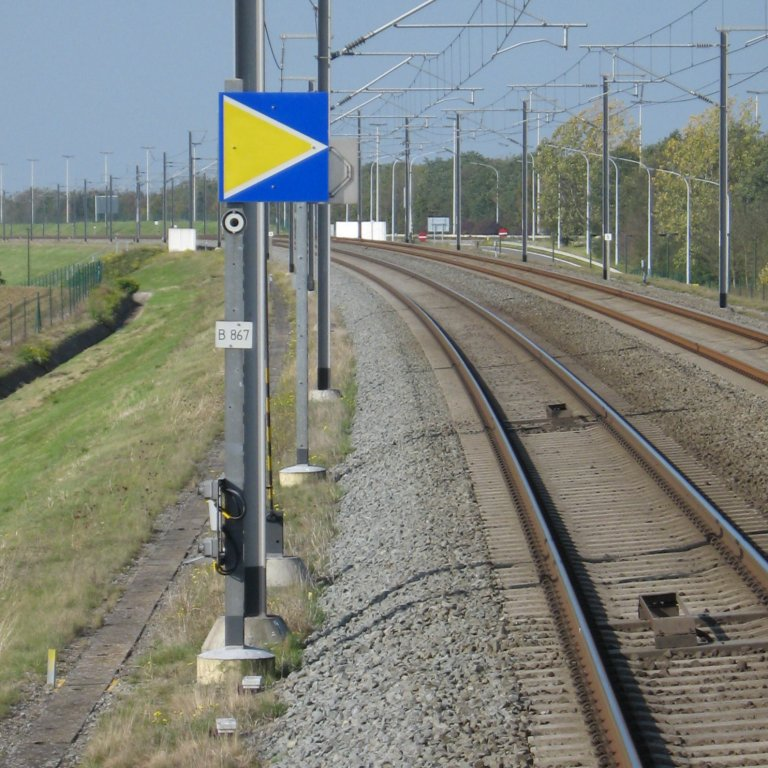
A main stop sign

Since the end of 2025 Belgium is completely covered by ETCS levels 1 (both Limited Supervision and Full Supervision) and 2, with the exception of the HSL 1 to France.

=== Other cab signalling systems ===
- TVM 430 on the line 1, the only main line where ETCS is not yet installed
