= Euchontha memor =

Scientific classification
- Kingdom: Animalia
- Phylum: Arthropoda
- Clade: Pancrustacea
- Class: Insecta
- Order: Lepidoptera
- Superfamily: Noctuoidea
- Family: Notodontidae
- Genus: Euchontha
- Species: E. memor

Binomial name
- Euchontha memor Warren, 1904

Species of moth

Euchontha memor is a moth of the family Notodontidae first described by William Warren in 1904. It is found in Peru.
