= Minimus =

British series of Latin textbooks

The Minimus books are a series of school textbooks, written by Barbara Bell, illustrated by Helen Forte, and published by the Cambridge University Press, designed to help children of primary school age to learn Latin. The books espouse some of the principles of the direct method of language teaching, and feature a mouse of the same name; minimus is (Latin for "smallest", and also a pun on mus — Latin for "mouse". Minimus is known by the publisher as "the mouse that made Latin cool". There are two books in the series: Minimus: Starting out in Latin and Minimus Secundus. The first book is aimed at 7- to 10-year-olds, and the second continues the education for children up to 13 years old.

The stories presented in each chapter revolve around a family. The family is based on a real family who lived at the Roman fort of Vindolanda near Hadrian’s Wall in northern Britain. The books feature many artifacts from Vindolanda, integrating real objects into fictional plot lines.

In 2011, it was reported that 125,000 copies had been sold.

== Regular characters ==
- Minimus, a mouse
- Vibrissa (Latin for Whisker), the family cat
- Flavius, the father and fort commander of Vindolanda
- Lepidina, the mother
- Flavia, the daughter
- Iulius, the older son
- Rufus, the youngest child of the family
- Corinthus, a Greek slave who is excellent at reading and writing
- Candidus, a British slave who is very good at cooking
- Pandora, a slave girl who is a hairdresser
- Trifosa, Pandora’s replacement

== Italian version ==
In 2007, the Minimus books were adapted for Italian pupils. As a single volume, the material is aimed at an older audience. The setting of the stories is altered to several European locations and there is considerably more formal grammar and exercises, in line with Italian teaching methods.

== See also ==
- Cambridge Latin Course
