= House of the Greek Epigrams =

Roman townhouse in Pompeii

- Casa degli Epigrammi Greci
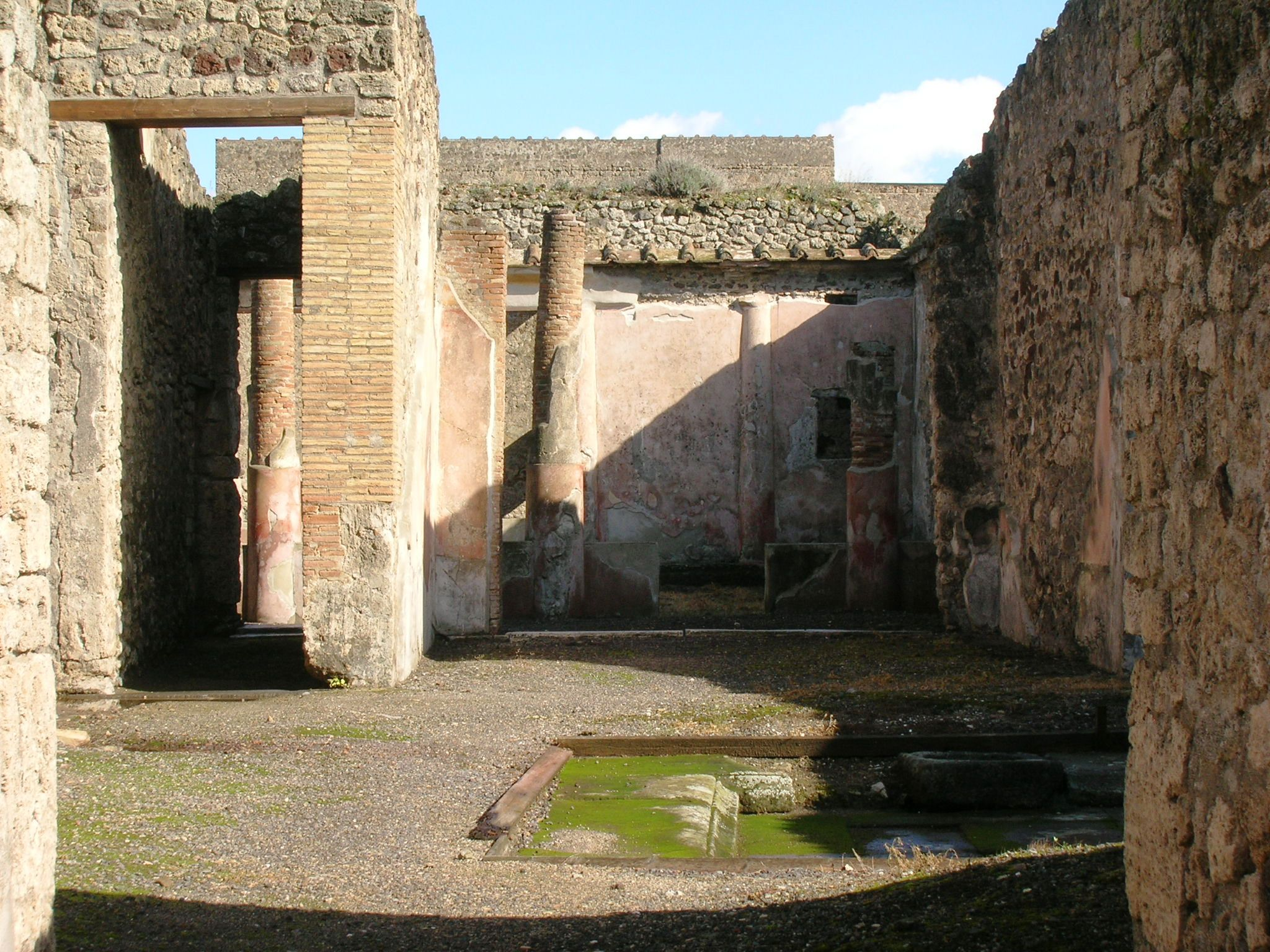
- Atrium of the House of the Greek Epigrams
- Interactive map of the House of the Greek Epigrams area

General information
- Status: archaeological remains
- Architectural style: Roman fauces-atrium-tablinum matrix
- Classification: Townhouse
- Location: Pompeii, Roman Empire, V, I, 18, Via del Vesuvio, Pompei, Italy, Pompei, Italy
- Coordinates: 40°45′08″N 14°29′09″E
- Current tenants: 0
- Named for: Greek epigrams on the wall in room "y"
- Construction started: 2nd half of the 2nd century BCE
- Renovated: Third quarter of 1st century BCE
- Destroyed: 79

Design and construction
- Known for: Frescoes depicting the myth of Admetus and Alcestis, Danae with the child Perseus, Mars and Venus, and Theseus and Ariadne

Other information
- Number of rooms: 26 (lower floor)

The House of the Greek Epigrams (Casa degli Epigrammi Greci, V 1,18) is a Roman residence in the ancient town of Pompeii that was destroyed by the eruption of Mount Vesuvius in 79 CE. It is named after wall paintings with inscriptions from Greek epigrams in a small room (y) next to the peristyle.

The home at the time it was destroyed was the result of merging at least two earlier dwellings dating back to the second half of the second century B.C.E. It is estimated this merger occurred around the third quarter of the first century B.C.E. It is thought further alterations took place in the second half of the first century CE as well.

The remains of a staircase at another of the home's entrances, V 1,12, indicate there was once an upper floor over that portion of the house, probably used as an apartment rental. Another staircase was found in the south end of the west portico of the peristyle that appears to be associated with the same service functions as the rooms directly below.

== Excavation History ==
The first of the home's rooms were discovered in April 1748 during the very first days of the excavation of Pompeii. More of its rooms were unearthed in late 1875 - 1876 and additional excavations were conducted in 1908. Like other structures in this insula, the house was seriously damaged in the 1943 Allied bombing raid on Pompeii and again in the earthquake of 1980.

The peristyle was excavated for paleo botanical remains in 2004-2006 as part of the Swedish Pompeii Project in collaboration with Prof. M. Robinson from Oxford University. Room x, thought to be a domestic work area, was also excavated to gain further information about the house's structural history at that time. In 2010–11, the house underwent extensive modern repairs.

== Social Context ==
The structure's main entrance (18), tucked between two shops, fronts the Via del Vesuvio, a bustling street of merchants and artisans' workshops, cauponae, a bakery complex and a substantial inn. Neighboring notable residences include Casa del Torello di Bronzo (V 1,7), Casa di Cecilio Giocondo (V 1, 26), and across the street, House of Orpheus (VI 14,20), and House of Laocoon (VI 14,30). The house is flanked by a two-story workshop known as the Statio of the Aliarii as well as another workshop, both damaged severely in the Allied bombing of 1943. Just north of these shops is a confectionary (entrances 14,15, 16) as evidenced by the discovery of bronze cake molds. The confectioner's little townhouse is finely decorated in the Fourth Style with children and animals painted on a black ground in its ala. Also nearby is the Inn of Salvius, a substantial two-story establishment with a u-shaped brick counter with six dolia, and two other rooms for customers' use decorated with 4th style paintings, overlooking a courtyard with a kitchen at the end. It was here that the body of a man was found surrounded by some coins and a remarkable amount of jewelry: 5 pairs of earrings, 11 gold rings, 3 silver rings, as well as a spoon and a small silver-disc with a head in bas-relief, numerous gemstones and two bronze signet rings/seals. It is thought the man was probably a looter though, that may have obtained his plunder from the nearby more luxurious homes including the House of the Greek Epigrams. Another home incorporating a bakery with a bakery shop adjoining it was also just steps away.

Across the street, is the remains of the Fullonica (laundry and residence) of Marcus Vesonius Primus (VI 14,22), also known as the Fullonica of Balbino or Balbinus. This substantial establishment included a spacious atrium and tablinum as well as the cleaning vats but may have produced a prodigious amount of unpleasant odors because of the collection and use of human urine for cleaning garments.

== Structure and Decoration ==
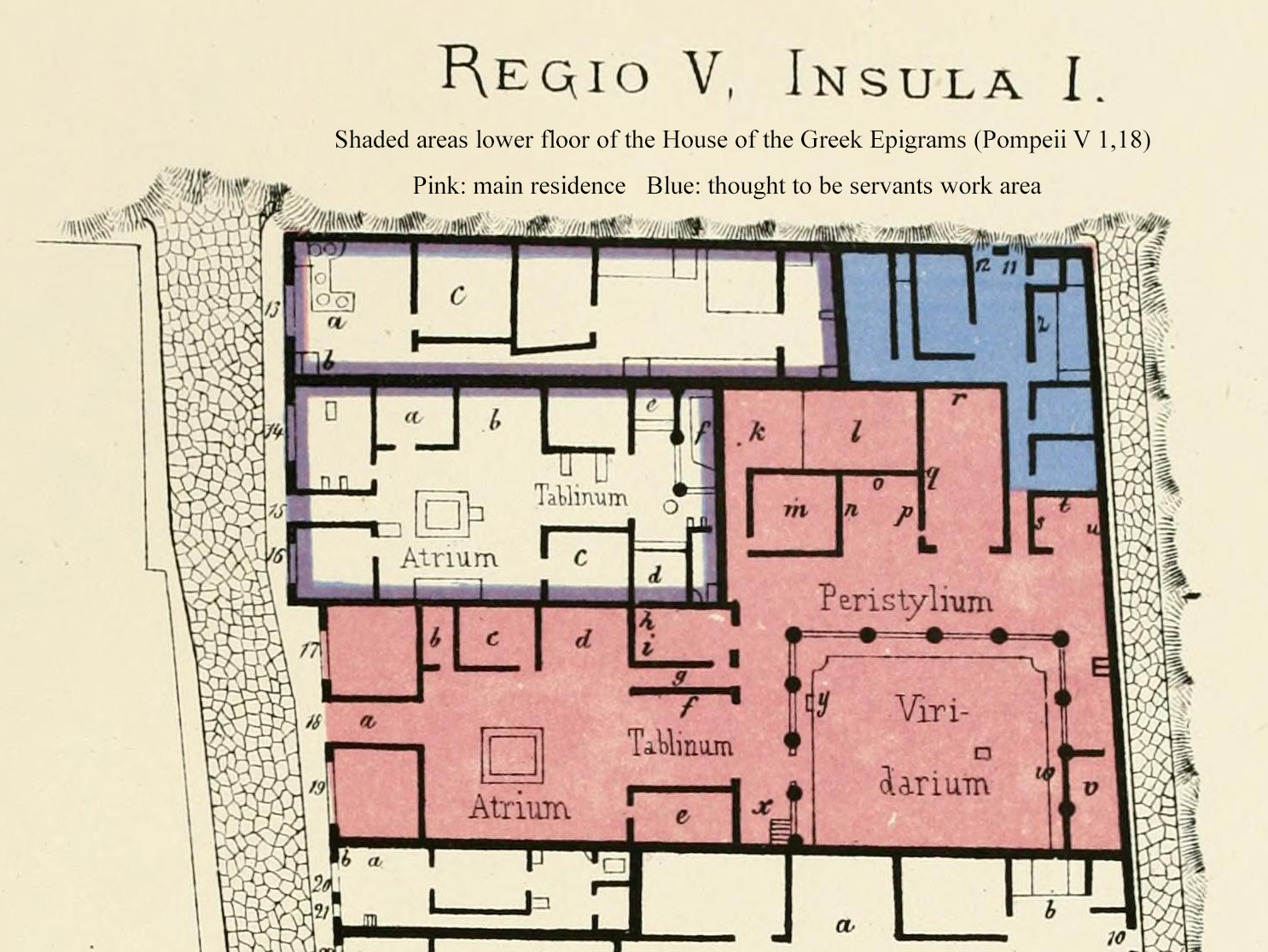
Floor plan of the House of the Greek Epigrams Pompeii (V 1,18)

Entering the home using its front entrance (18), a visitor could look across a wide atrium with impluvium slightly offset to the right, through a curtained tablinum to the red and white-columned peristyle where a mural on the rear wall depicted a bull attacked by a tiger. The panel painting was surrounded by flora and adjoins a panel depicting a fountain with peacocks in a garden with a tree and birds. Nineteenth century excavators conjectured that the scene of the bull and tiger clearly visible from the tablinum was probably selected to confer a subtle message to visiting clients.

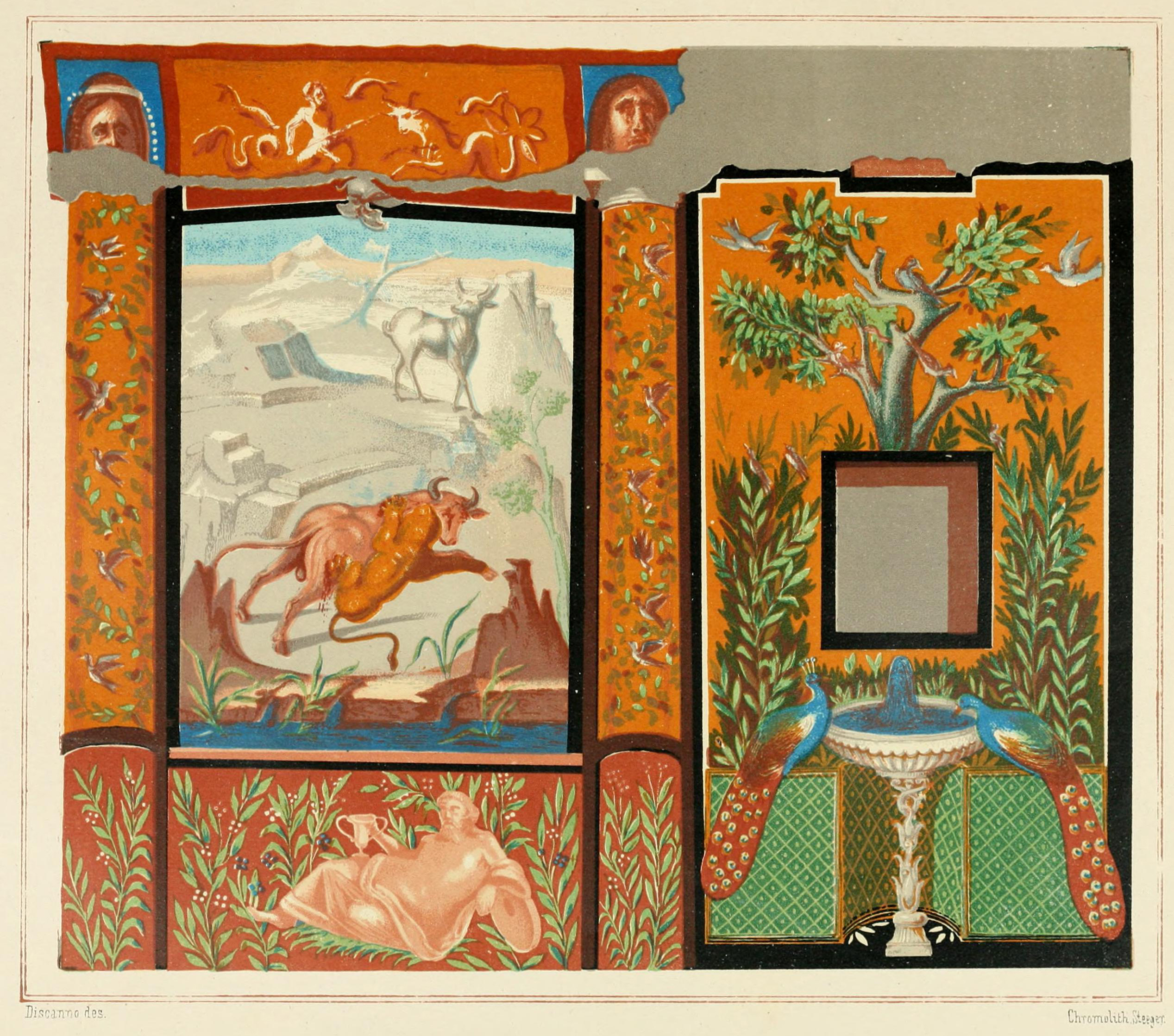
Fresco of Tiger attacking a bull from the peristyle of the House of the Greek Epigrams Pompeii by Geremia Discanno

To the left of the entrance is a small undecorated cubicle (b) thought to be used by the doorman, behind which a bedroom (c) is decorated in the Third Style with large yellow fields in which floating vessels and animals are portrayed. The yellow panels are interspersed with white intermediate fields and the upper wall has a white background as well.

The atrium itself was decorated in the Second Style with wide red panels interspersed with black panels painted with slender candelabra supporting garlands terminated with vases or crowns. The busts of seven gods painted within medallions embellished the large red fields. A curtain separated part of the atrium into a space deemed to be an "ala" (d). It, too, was decorated in the Third Style with red fields containing masterfully painted animals including a he-goat and a hound chasing a hare. Here, a cache of silver utensils was found as well as a fine weave of gold that excavators conjectured may have formed a purse.

A bedroom with bare walls (e) was discovered to the right of the tablinum. Fragmentary fresco remains in the tablinum (f) reveal it was painted with red and yellow fields interspersed with black fields. Enough of a mural panel remained upon excavation to identify it as Venus and Adonis with a weeping Eros. On one side panel an erote leads a greyhound on a leash, on the other he is standing with a killed boar. In the yellow upper wall an erote wearing a garland was found. The tablinum's red screed pavement with multi-colored chips includes an inlaid pattern with pieces of marble (opus sectile).

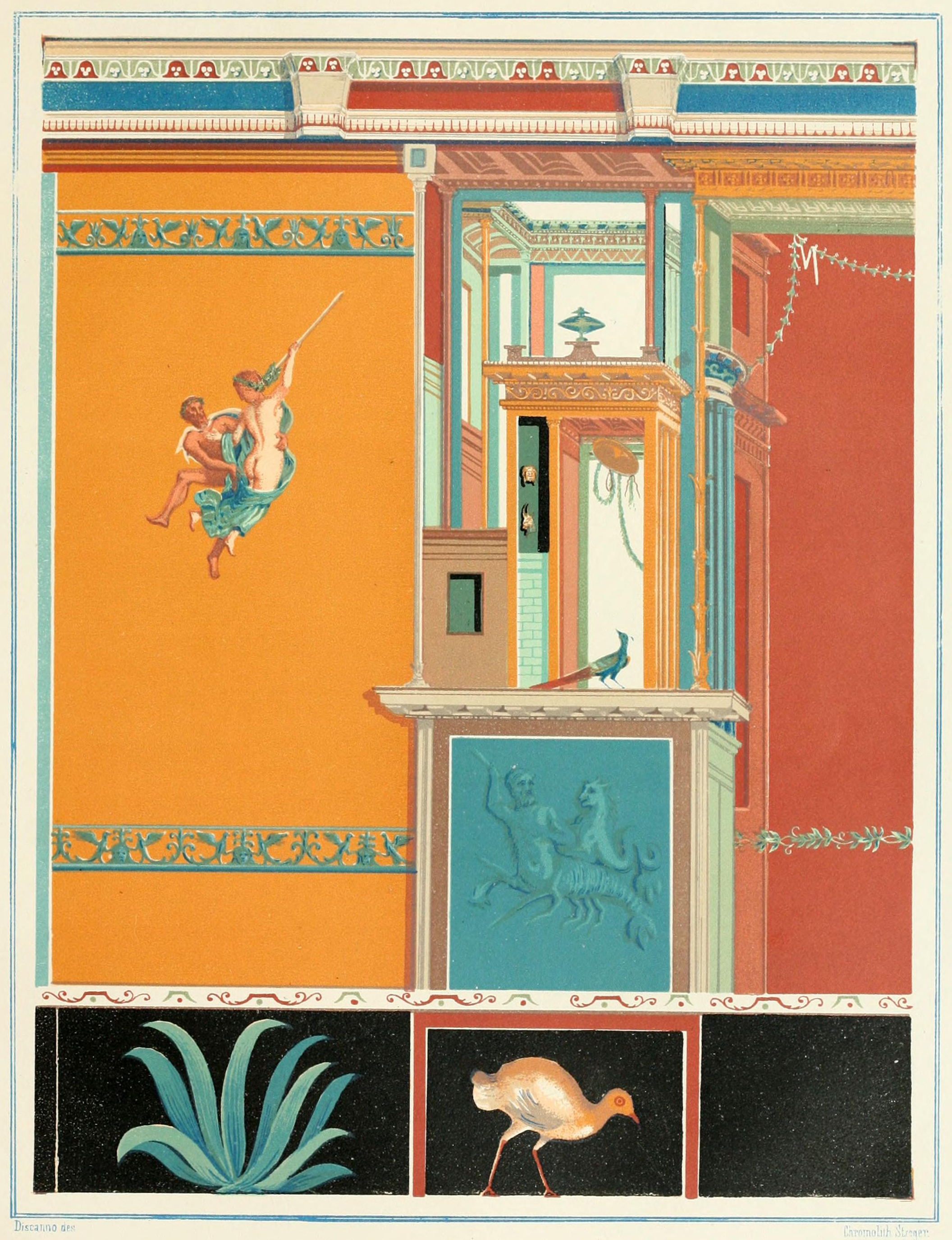
Frescoed wall from a small room in the House of the Greek Epigrams, Pompeii by Geremia Discanno

A richly decorated sitting-room (h,i), accessed by a short corridor (g), quickly fell into ruin after it was uncovered. But artists copied the details immediately upon excavation so these documented a very well-preserved group of Bacchantes as well as green and yellow monochromes. A panel painting depicting a heron, a dog with the inscription ASYNCLETVS in the base, as well as a bird fighting a snake was removed to the museum in Naples. The wall was topped by a wide painted stucco molding.

On the south upper wall, a scenic painting referring to the myth of Admetus and Alcestis was found. Admetus, a king at Pherae in Thessaly, was promised by an oracle a longer life if someone would sacrifice themselves for him in the hour of his death. While neither father nor mother would die for him, his wife Alcestis, did. Proserpina, wife of Hades, moved by the love of Alcestis, sent her back to the world of the living from Hades. Euripides presented this myth in his tragedy Alcestis.

This myth (or play) was popular in both Pompeii and Herculaneum as several murals with this subject have been found.

"In addition to Admetus and Alcestis, in this painting we also see Admetus' parents, the god Apollo, a youth communicating the oracle on a scroll, and another female figure who cannot be clearly identified. Another painting, destroyed in the center, depicts Admetus with a sadly lowered head, next to him Alcestis, of whom only one arm is left. On the left sits the other female figure and behind her are Admetus' parents. This second panel is inserted into a rich architectural painting where on both sides people step out of the gates of the palace and listen to the oracle in amazement," - Emile Presuhn, die neuesten Ausgrabungen von 1874 bis 1881 (translated).

A collection of rooms to the left of the peristyle accessible by a narrow corridor are thought to have been a later addition to the original structure. A long narrow room divided by a curtain is thought to have been a triclinium (l) with antechamber (k). Although most of the Third Style decoration of sitting-room (m) has been lost, an intricate geometric floor mosaic was still visible in the late 19th century.

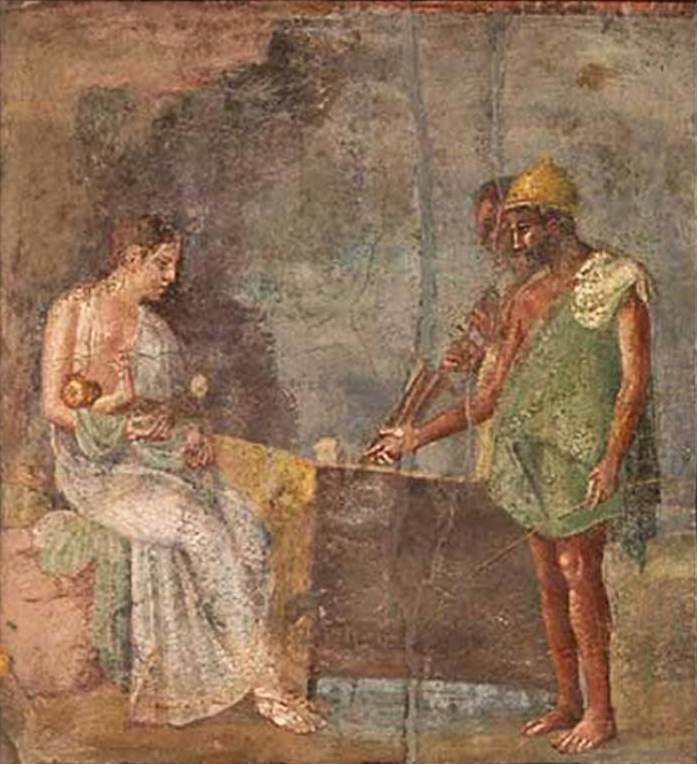
Danae cradling baby Perseus arriving in Seriphos on west wall of exedra o House of the Greek Epigrams Pompeii

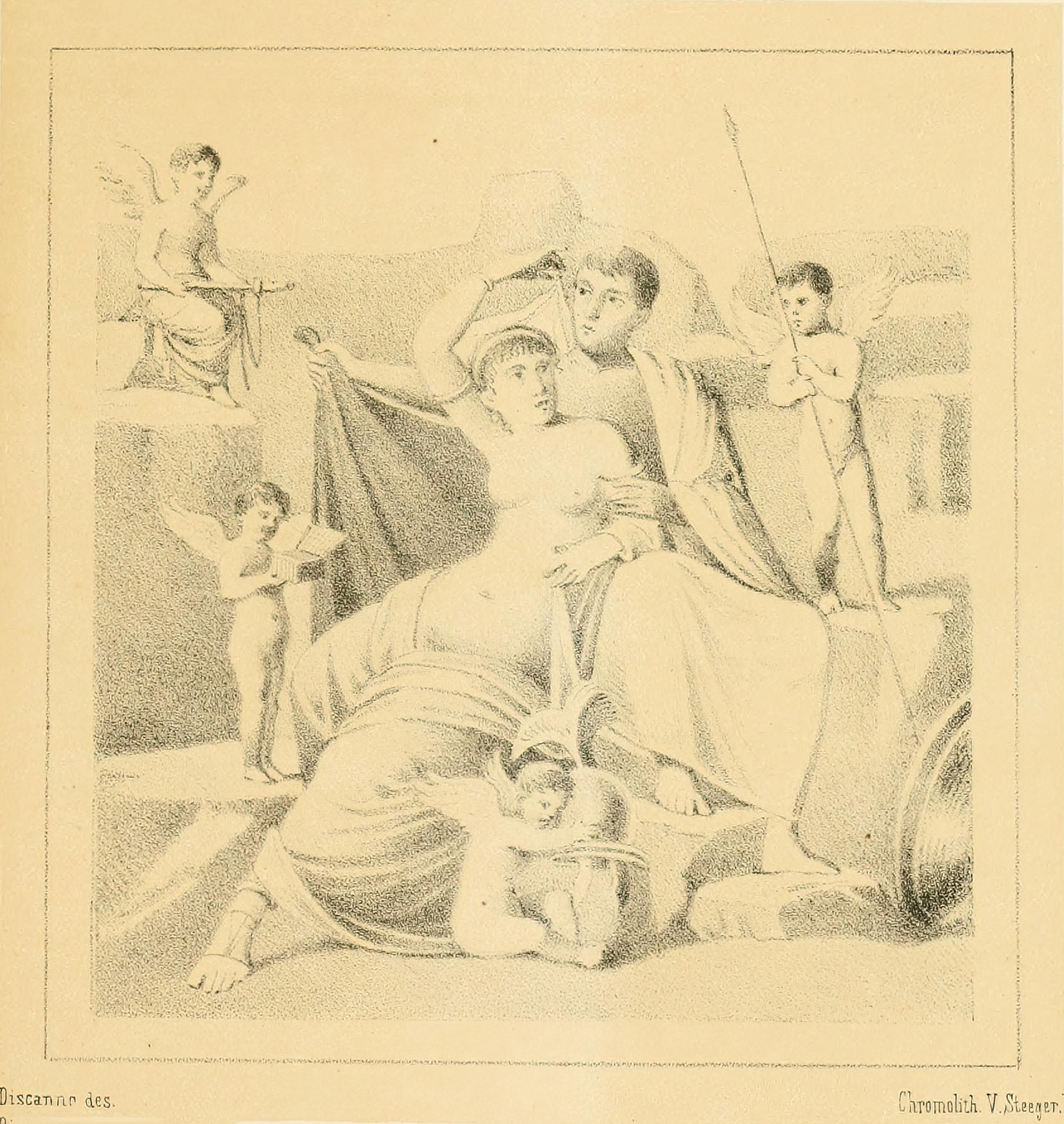
Venus at her toilette with Mars at her shoulder from exedra "o" by Geremia Discanno

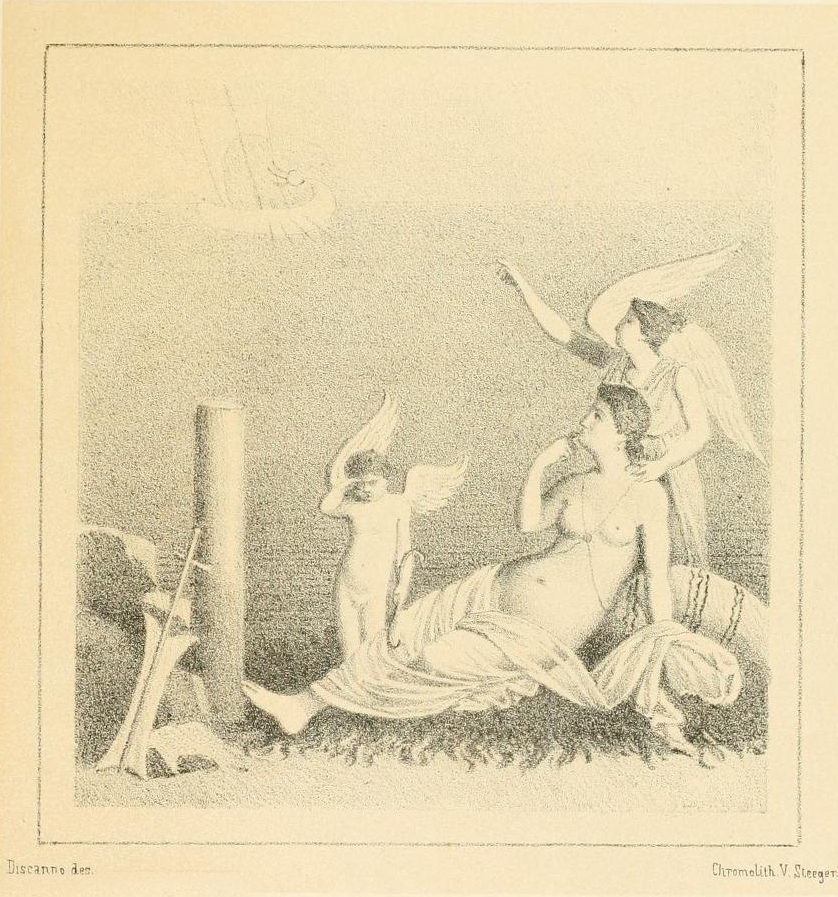
Ariadne abandoned on Naxos by Geremia Discanno

Next to the sitting room, excavators uncovered a stately oecus (reception room) decorated in the Second Style with a panel painting of Danae with a child, Perseus. Artist Geremia Discanno sketched the painting before it was removed to the museum in Naples. Two other panel paintings, one of Mars and Venus (at o) with three erotes playing with the weapons of Mars and one erote with the toiletry-objects of Venus, and a painting of Theseus and Ariadne, the most popular subject in Pompeian painting, were left in situ. Ariadne on Naxos awakens and in despair she looks after the ship of the unfaithful, which is already sailing far away. Nemesis holds a ball of yarn and conjures up revenge, and Eros weeps over the betrayed love. In house No. 26 of the same Insula 1, Reg. V, another moment of the same saga is represented.

Next to the oecus is a deep exedra (q,r) decorated in the Second Style with alternating red and yellow panels.

"Similar to the Ala, animal figures are found on the side panels. The middle fields of each wall are black and taken up by landscape representations, which, however, do not reach down to the bottom. One of these pictures had already crumbled during the excavation; the other two are currently almost unrecognizable. At r, Paris was represented with his flock and Mercury; the latter announces the approach of the three goddesses, as the inscription hic judices indicates: "here thou shalt be arbiter." Diana in the bath can still be seen at q, while Actaeon can no longer be seen," Emil Presuhn observes in his 1877 overview.

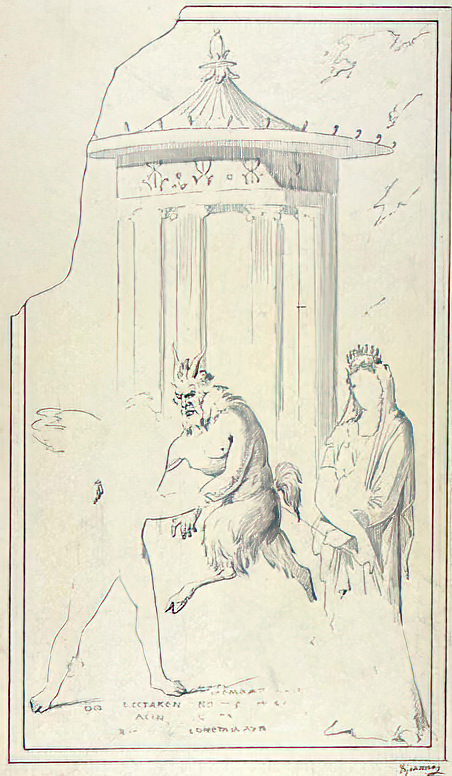
Wrestling Contest between Pan and Eros with epigrams below from west wall of exedra y in the House of the Greek Epigrams Pompeii by Geremia Discanno

The house takes its name from Greek inscriptions found in the last small room (s,t,u,) in the northeast corner of the peristyle. In addition to the inscriptions, it included archaic paintings in the Second Style that were not copied immediately after excavation and have been almost entirely lost. The subject of these paintings were Eros fighting Pan in the presence of Aphrodite, Homer seated with the symbols of the Iliad and the Odyssey with two fishermen in front of him, thought to refer to the legendary contest between Homer and Hesiod and Bacchus with his iconic panther. The epigrams are sayings from Greek anthology and an Alexandrian grammarian.

Tucked in the southeast corner of the peristyle behind the viridarium (garden) is a pantry (v) with a small window facing the garden, decorated in harmony with the peristyle's paintings. The garden itself contains a water valve controlling four taps. To the right of the entrance to the viridarium is a small undecorated room (x) with stairs leading to an upper floor that is no longer extant. The section of the floorplan shaded in blue is thought to have been working rooms and slave quarters with two side entrances 11, and 12, and a kitchen (z) with stove and small oven. These rooms were undecorated with raw limestone walls.

== Notable finds ==
On November 11, 1875, a bronze strigil with similar fragments.

On November 16 of 1875, a necklace of gold with emeralds and pearls and parts of a silver service as well as an ivory statuette depicting Venus were recovered in the atrium. The next day coins, a stamped seal with the following letters L. VAL. F. Lun. M 40 and an inkwell with lid inlaid with silver was found in room (c).

November 18, 1875, part of a bronze lamp stand in the shape of a tree branch, a glass jug, and silver fragments of frames.

November 20–22, 1875, wall paintings were excavated and removed to the museum.

On November 24, 1875, in the presence of distinguished visitors, a "special" excavation was conducted and a pair of gold garlic clove earrings and another pair of gold earrings with a brooch decorated with three emeralds in a design resembling a sea spider were "found." Workers also recorded the discovery of a fabric bag, a silver cup, a circular mirror with traces of gilding, fragments of ceramic serving ware, a bronze shovel with a deer foot handle, two strigils, coins, and locks.

In ala "e" silver and silver-embellished serving ware was found including a bowl decorated with silver and copper in a floral pattern, four silver plates with 5 petal rosettes in the center, four silver cups, three small saucers with traces of gilding, a round gilded base, three round conical bodied cups, and four spoons (cochlearia), designed so that the handle could be used to extract snails or cockles out of the shell. Also found were two shell pattern containers, two strigils joined by a ring, and a concave circular mirror with Hercules-style handle shaped like a club as well as a container with cylindrical neck.

== Examples of silver serving ware ==
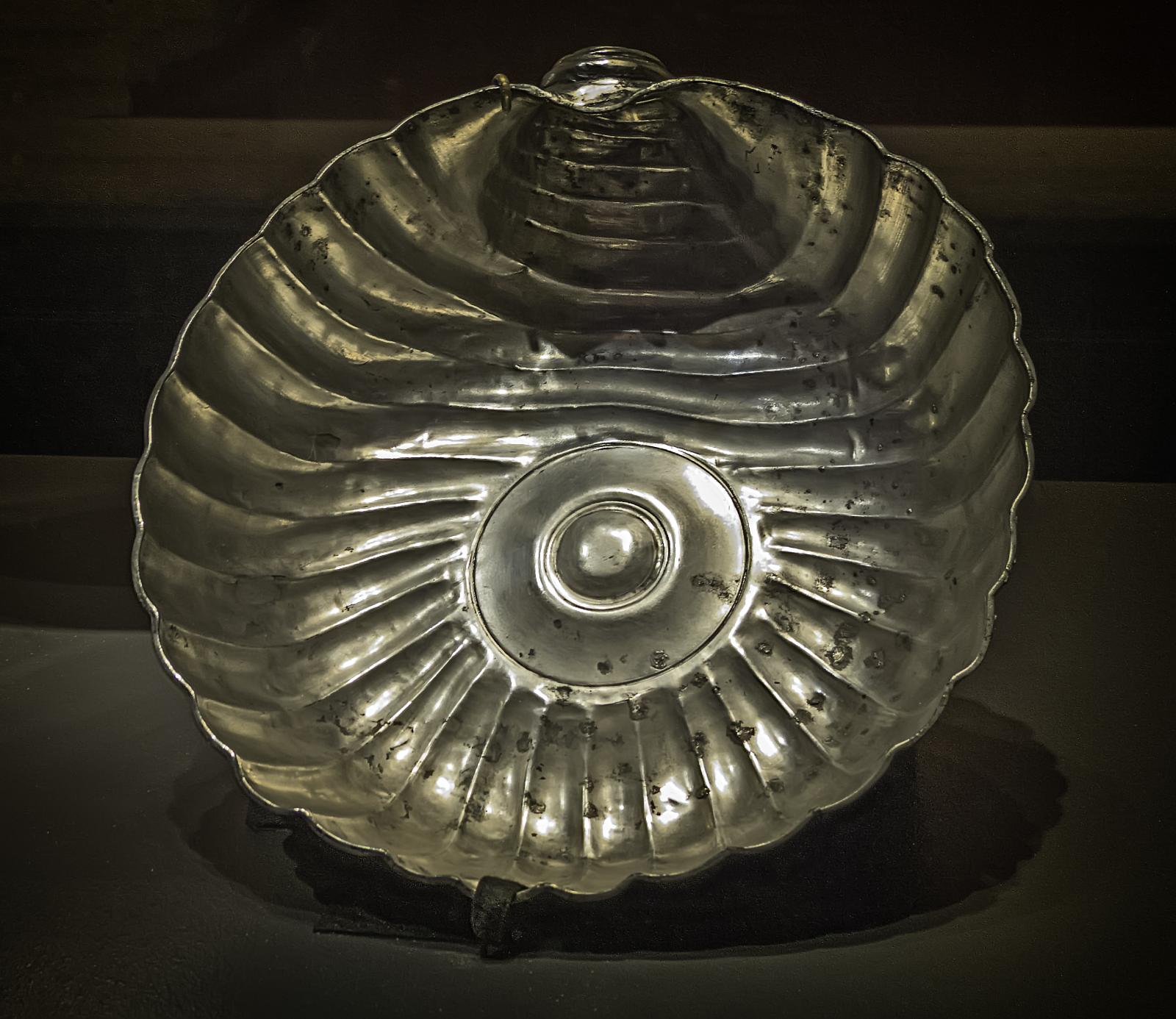
Silver shell-shaped cup for scooping water for hand washing during dinners and banquets from Pompeii Roman 1st century CE

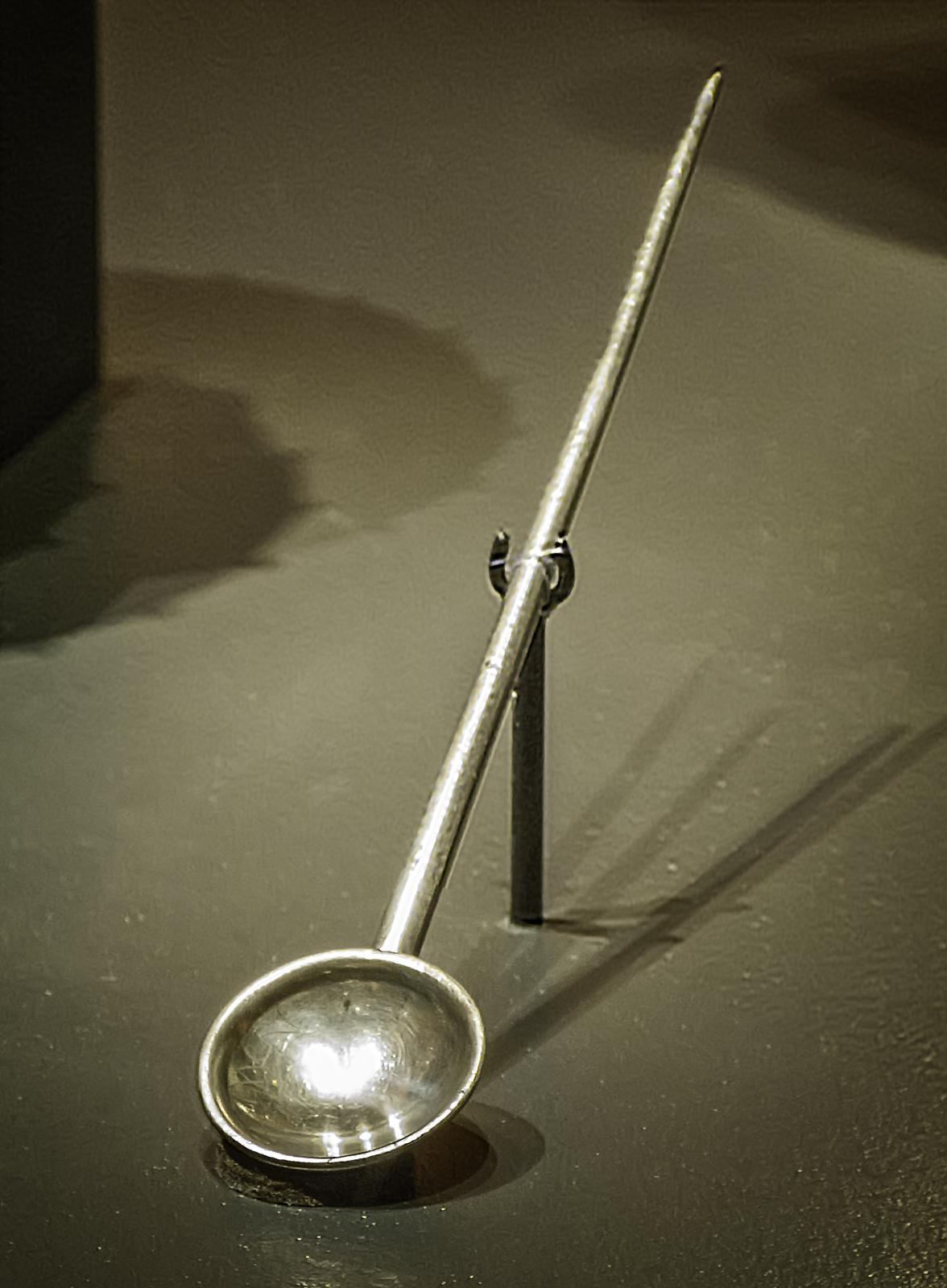
Silver shellfish spoon from Pompeii Roman 1st century CE

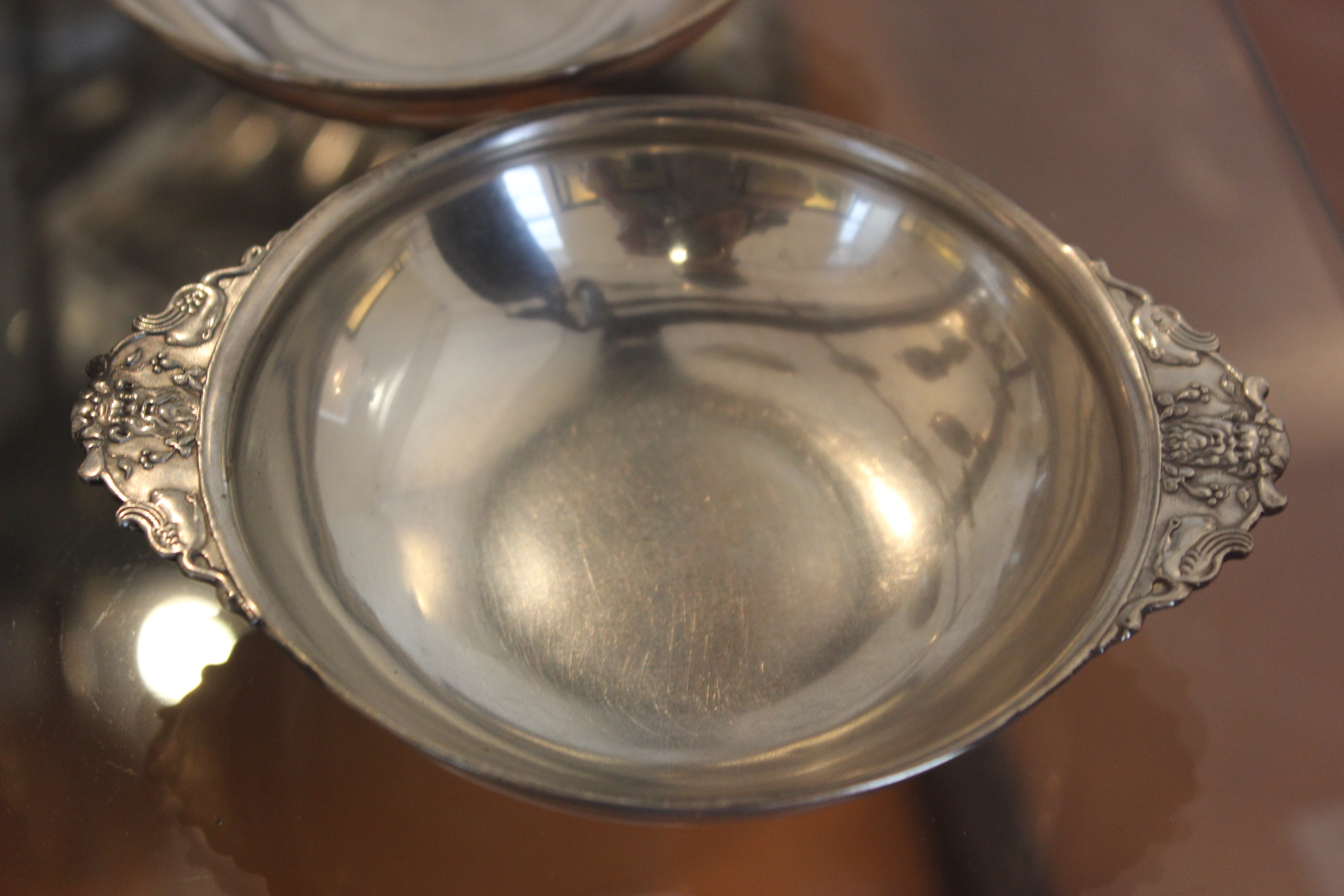
Silver saucer embellished with olive leaves, Pompeii, Roman 1st century CE

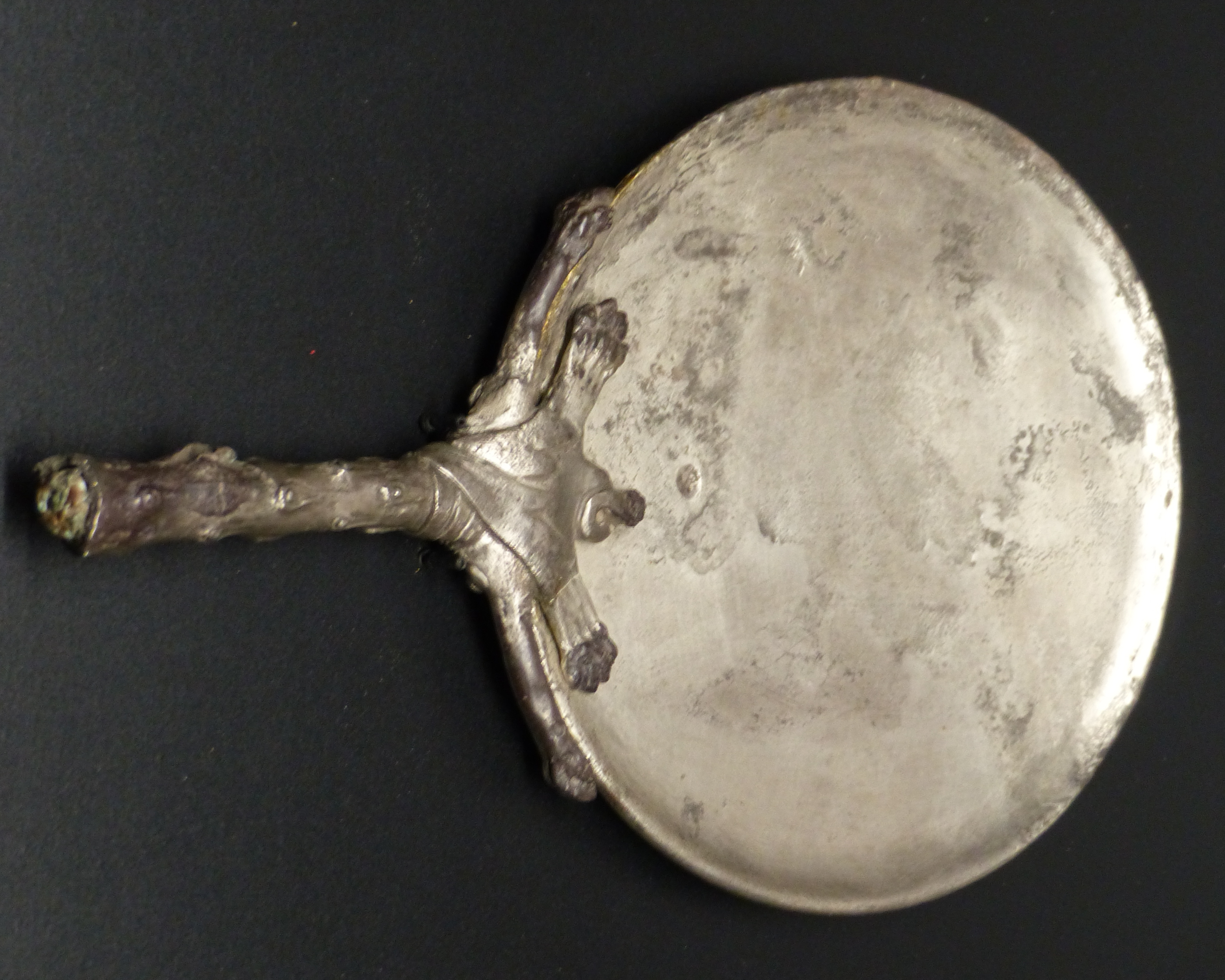
Silver mirror with Hercules-club handle similar to the one found in the House of the Greek Epigrams

On November 27, 1875, another "special" excavation was conducted in the tablinum and a fragmented statuette of Venus with a dolphin's head at her feet was discovered along with a circular silver baseplate, a bronze patera, a finial in the shape of a tiger's head, a goose-breasted vase with a lizard shaped handle, a watering vessel with detached handle shaped like a leaf and terminals in the form of snakes' heads, a statuette of Jupiter, with his left arm detached, from which his cloak hangs, and he holds in his hand a silver rod. In his left hand he has lightning bolts and at his feet a small eagle resting on the baseplate. Several glass bottles of various shapes were also found.

On December 15, 1875, the peristyle yielded a bronze vase with foliage-embellished handles, and a bronze cauldron. Also found were an iron hatchet, an inscribed amphora that said "Allianum," a coin, a bottle, and in room (d) A small bronze human foot with the upper part a perforated cylinder, possibly the base of a cabinet.

On December 22, 1875, four bone dice with rounded corners were found in a room near the peristyle. When excavations resumed on January 10, 1876, a bronze wind musical instrument with nine pipes of different sizes called a Fistula was found in exedra (o). The instrument was decorated with three small temples in high relief and two Egyptian-looking idols. One foot of lion-legged candlestick interspersed with leaves was also found.

On February 8, 1876, another "special" excavation was held and in triclinium (p) workers "found" a bronze folding table with four curved feet ending in horses' heads. A metal-framed wooden shelf with small flowers inlaid with silver was also discovered. Workers also uncovered a coal-fired vessel for boiling liquid. It had a faucet covered by a theater mask and a dolphin-embellished handle with three lion-legged feet to serve as its base. A patera and an oval-shaped vase with a decoration depicting Silenus with a wineskin on his shoulders were also found.

The next day, workers discovered in room (q) a bronze oil lamp with ring handle with fragments of chains for suspension, a liquid measure, a small bucket with movable handles, a strigil, some coins, bronze chair fragments, a shattered marble table top, a bowl, a glass cup, and a small glass carafe.

March 13, 1876, Graffito was uncovered: VIK PRIM VIR FELIX VK GERMANVS

August 16, 1876, a bronze jar and lock plate were found.

== Artwork ==
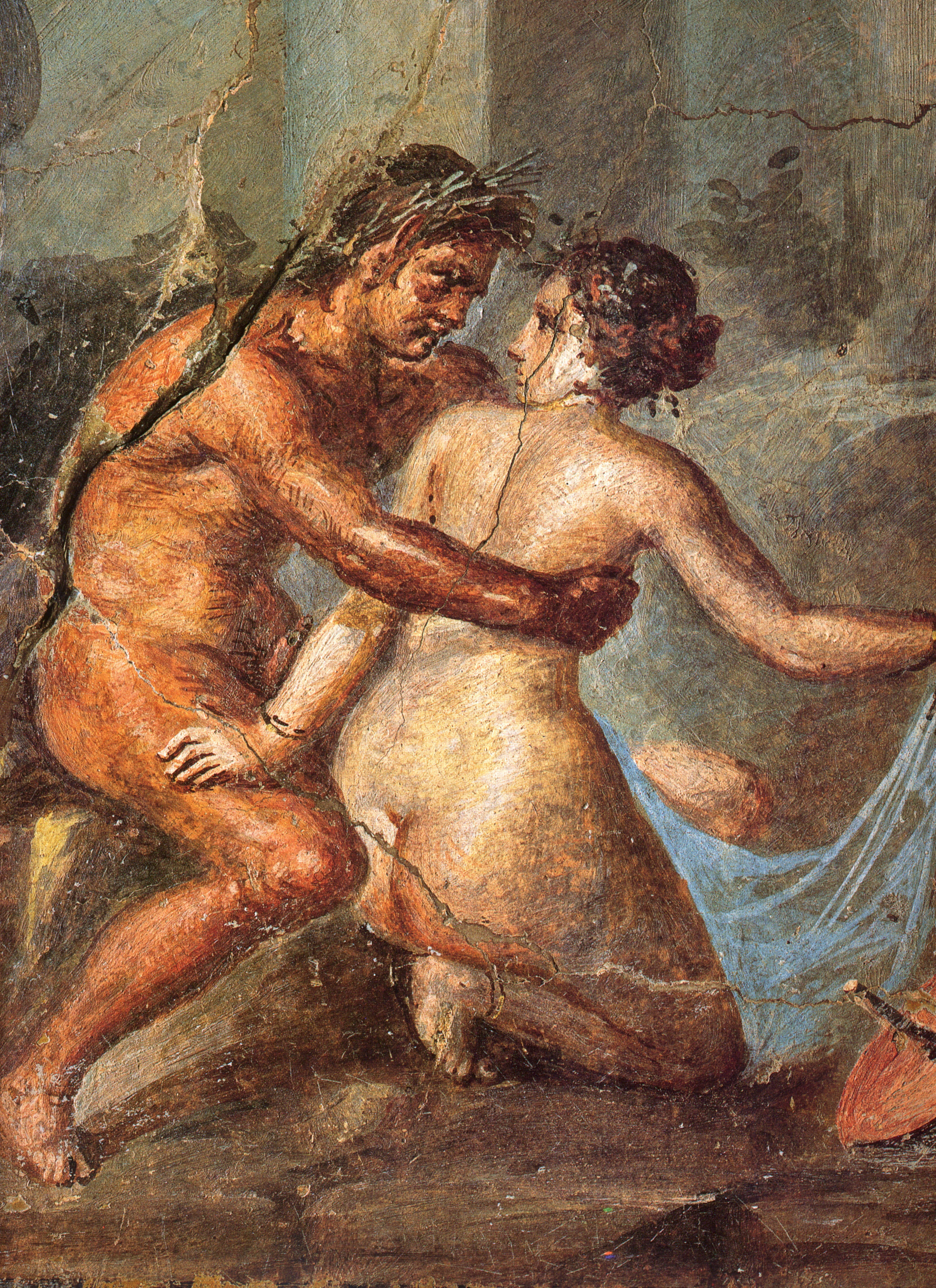
Fresco depicting Satyr ravishing a maenad from peristyle "i" House of the Greek Epigrams, Pompeii

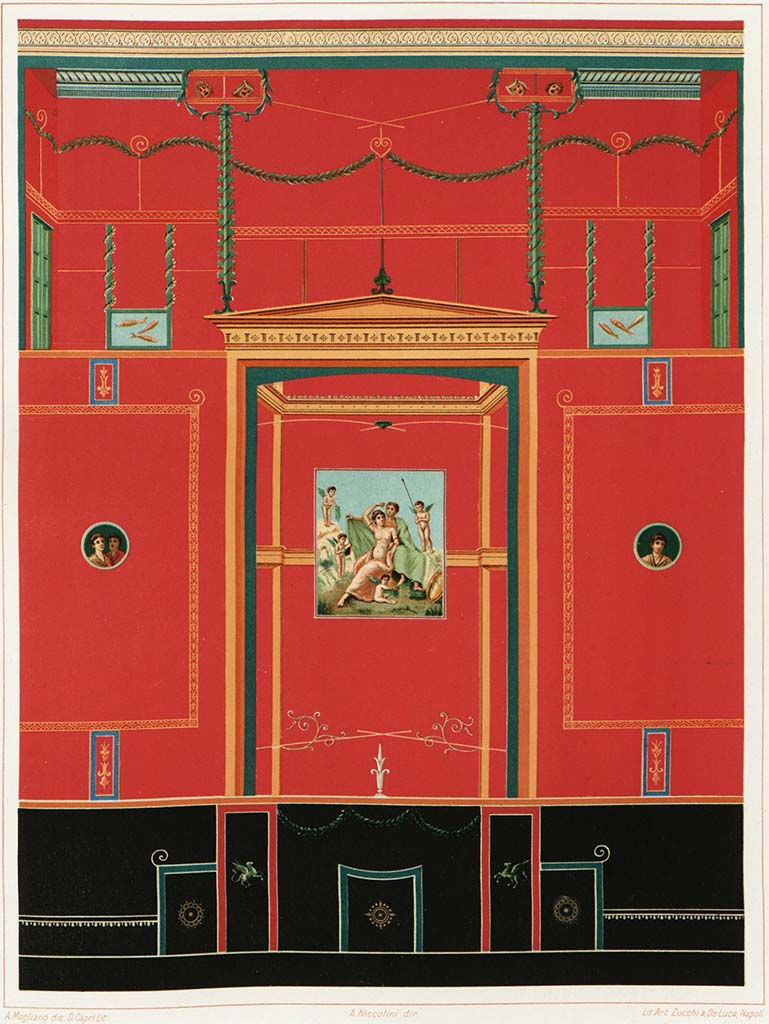
North wall of Exedra o in the House of the Greek Epigrams, Pompeii by A Magliano

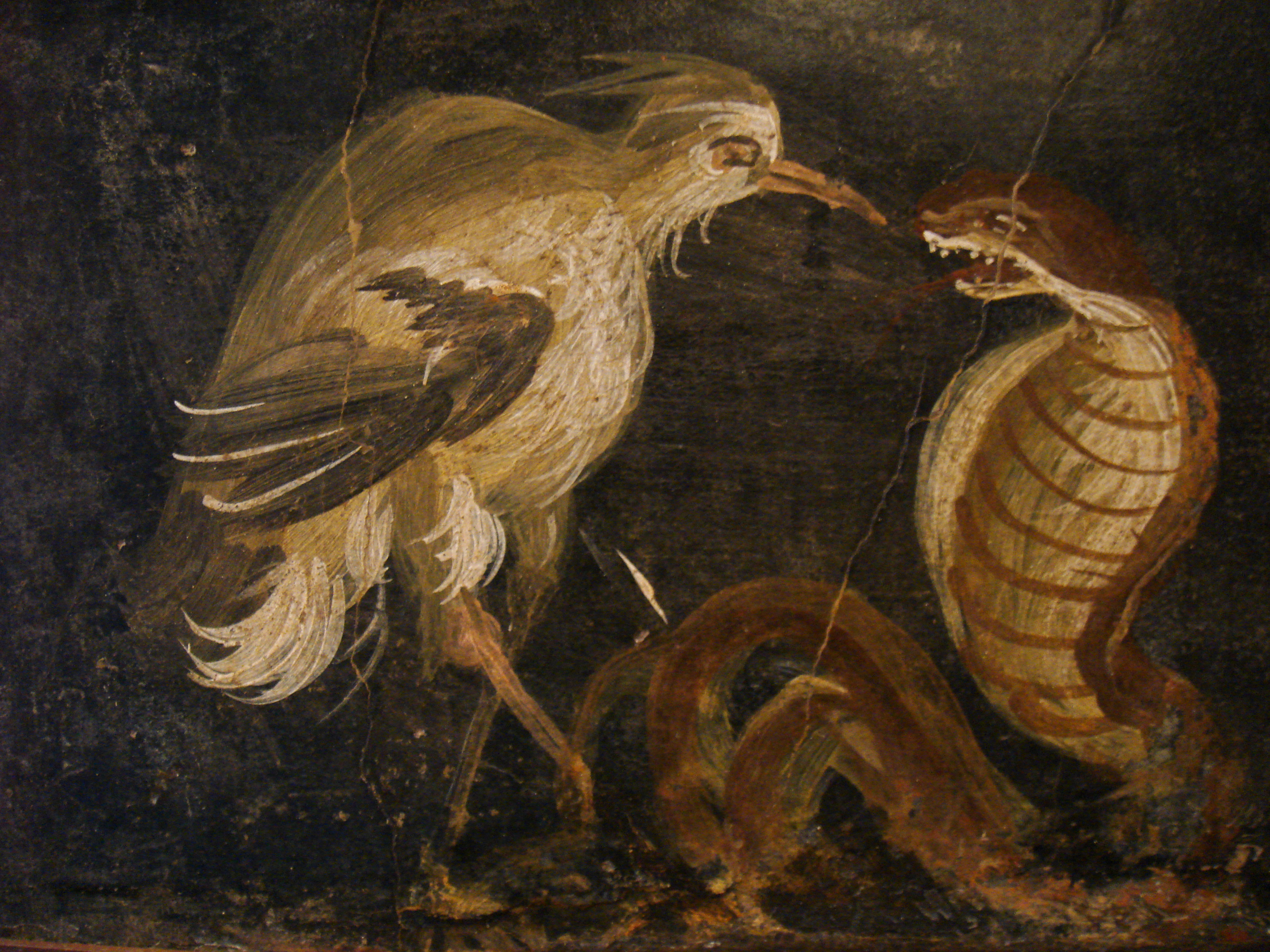
Heron attacking a cobra from the House of the Greek Epigrams, Pompeii

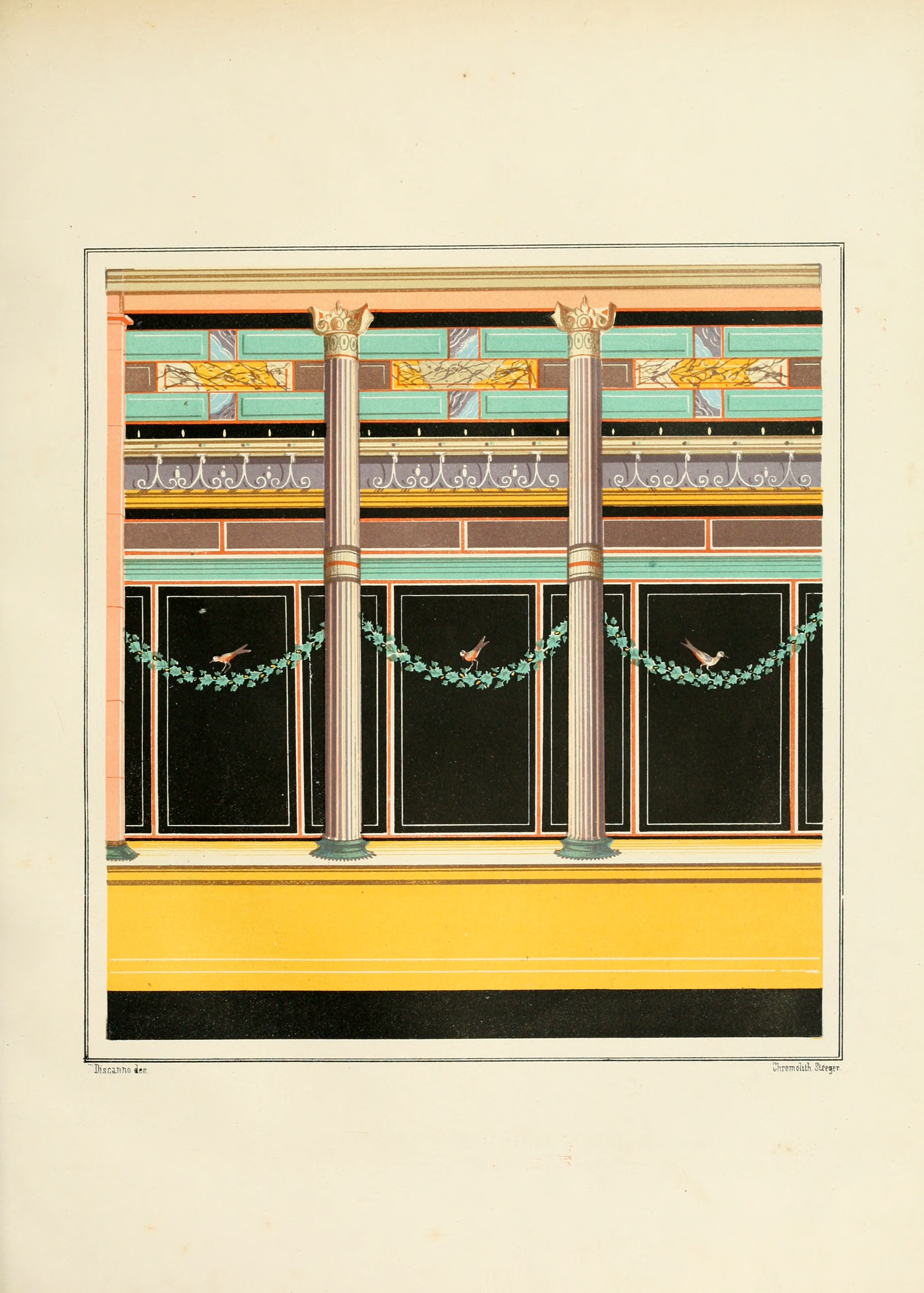
Frescoed wall from the atrium in the House of the Greek Epigrams, Pompeii by Geremia Discanno

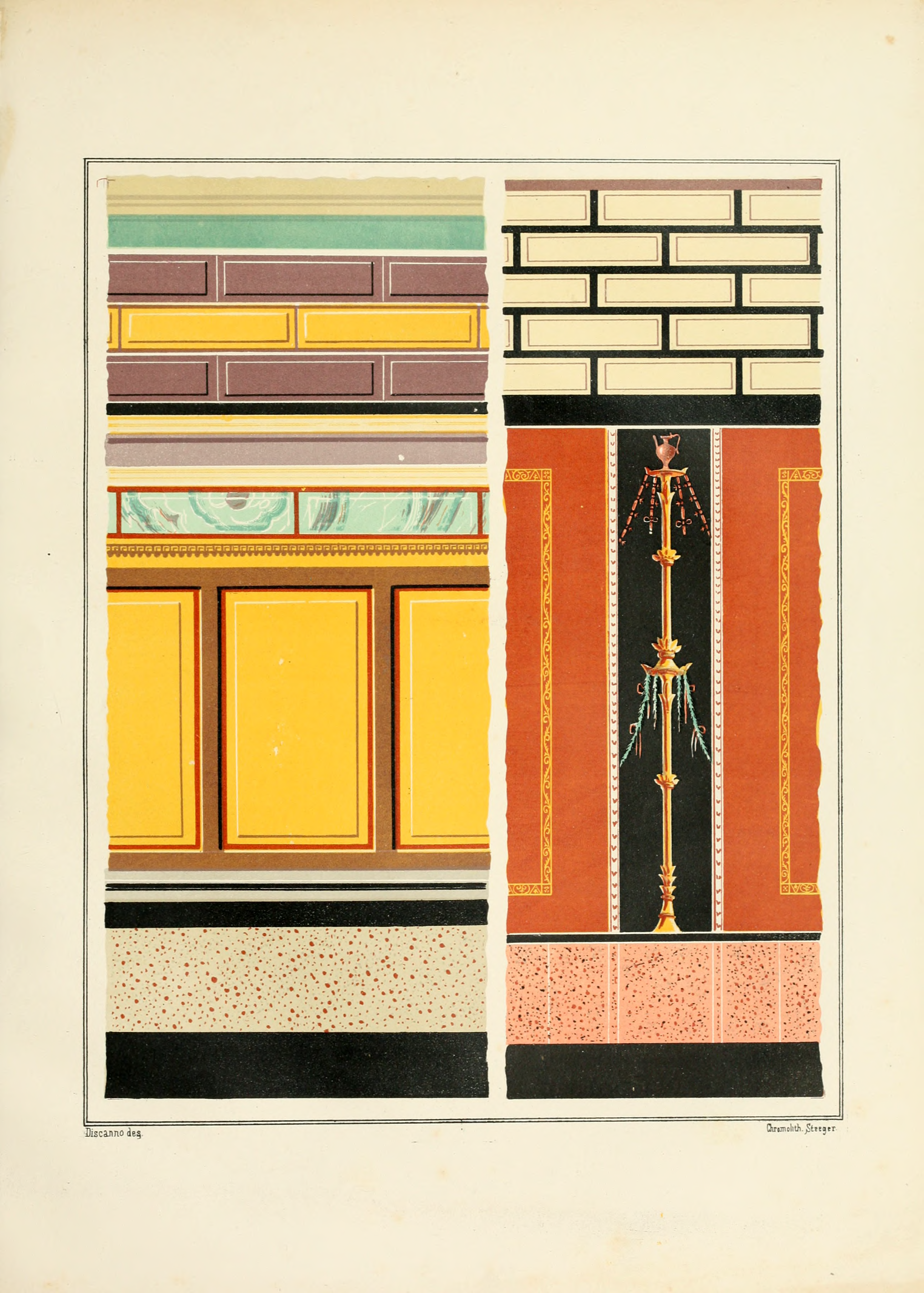
Frescoes from the atrium in the House of the Greek Epigrams, Pompeii by Geremia Discanno

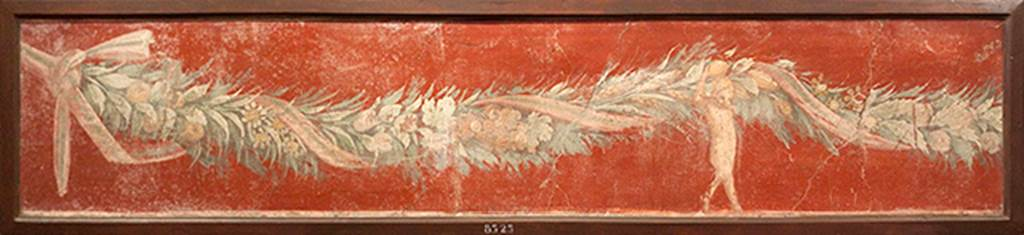
Fresco of ribbon wound in a garland of flowers, grapes, fruit and corn, and held up by a cupid in tablinum G

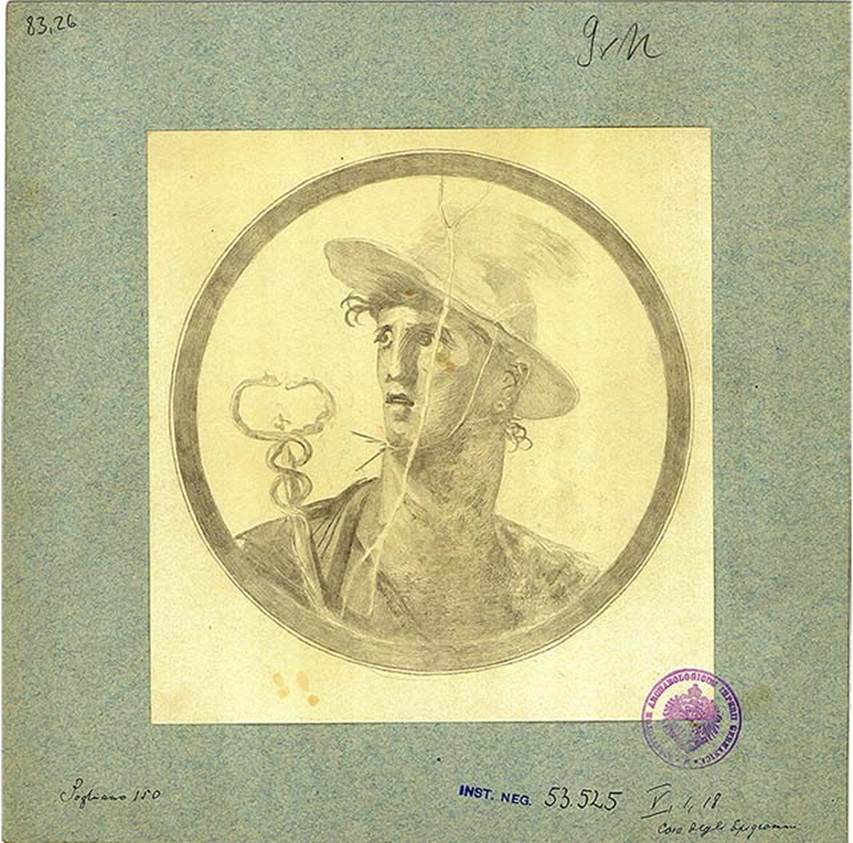
Medallion from the atrium depicting Hermes (Mercury) with petasus and caduceus

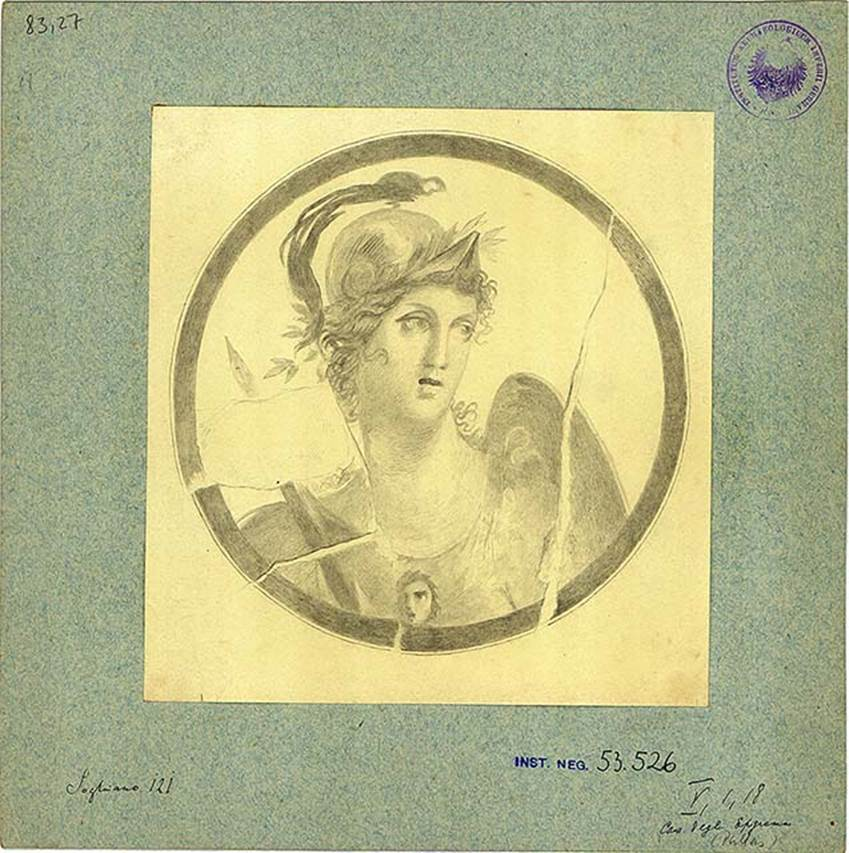
Medallion from the atrium depicting Athena (Minerva) with helmet, shield and lance

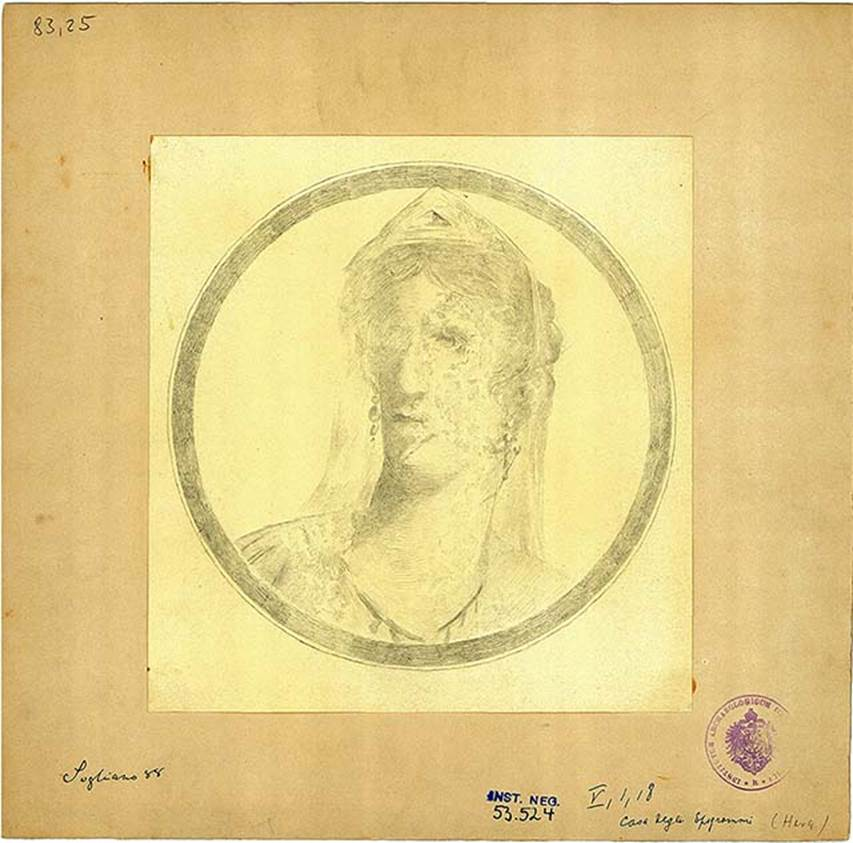
Medallion from the atrium depicting bust of Hera (Juno) wearing tiara and veil

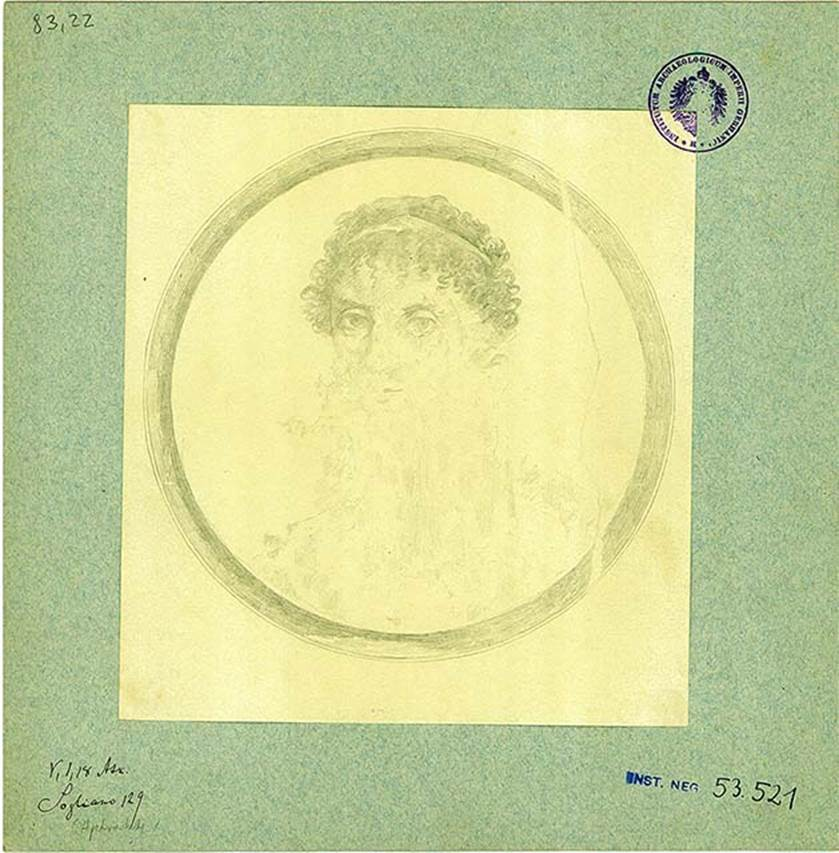
Medallion from the atrium depicting Aphrodite (Venus)

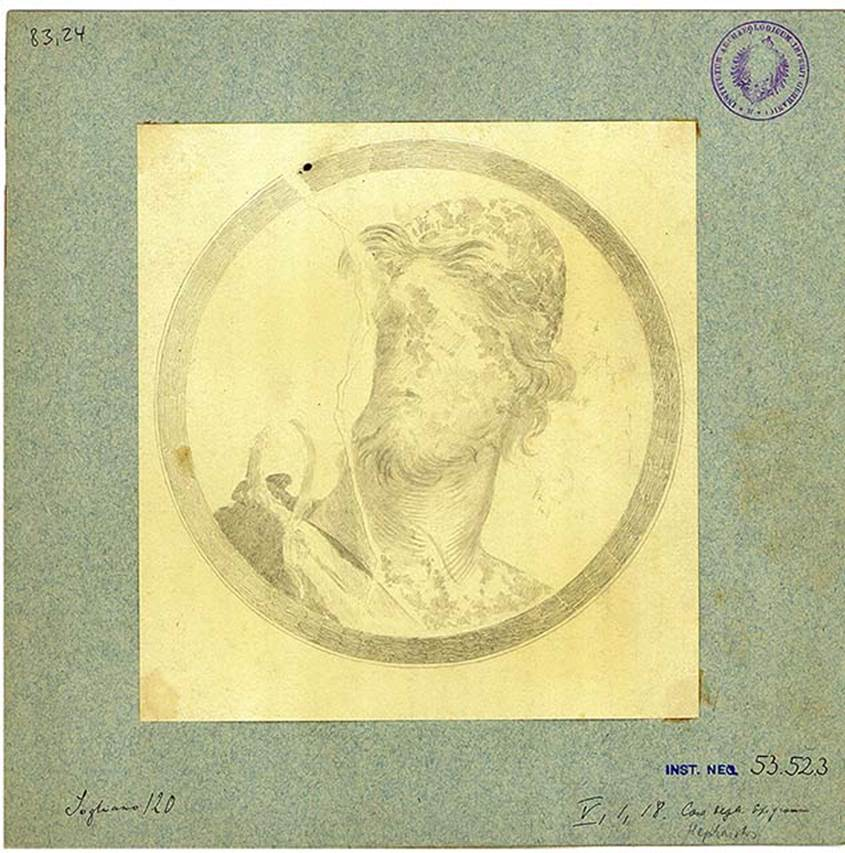
Medallion from the atriumdepicting Hephaestus (Vulcan) with beard

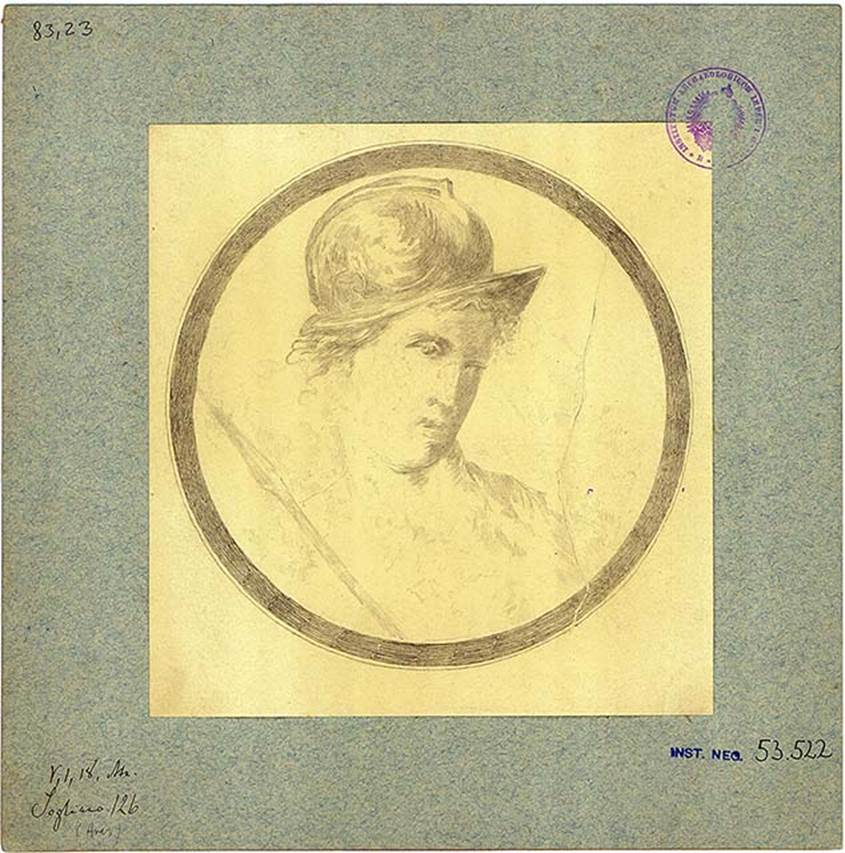
Medallion from the atrium depicting bust of Ares (Mars) with helmet and lance

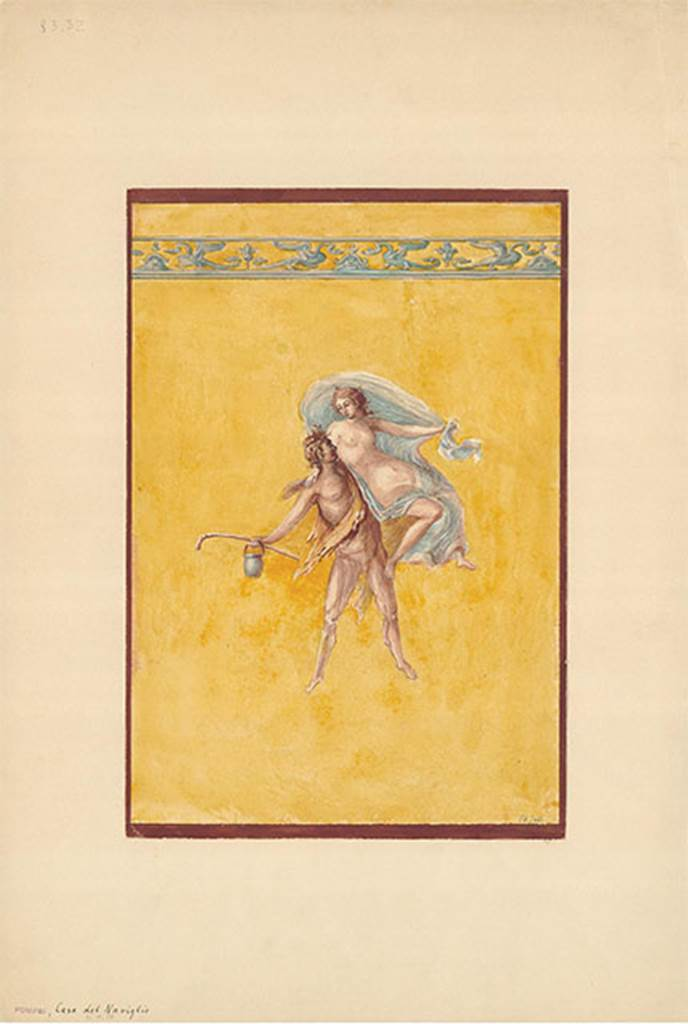
Satyr and maenad in cubiculum "n"

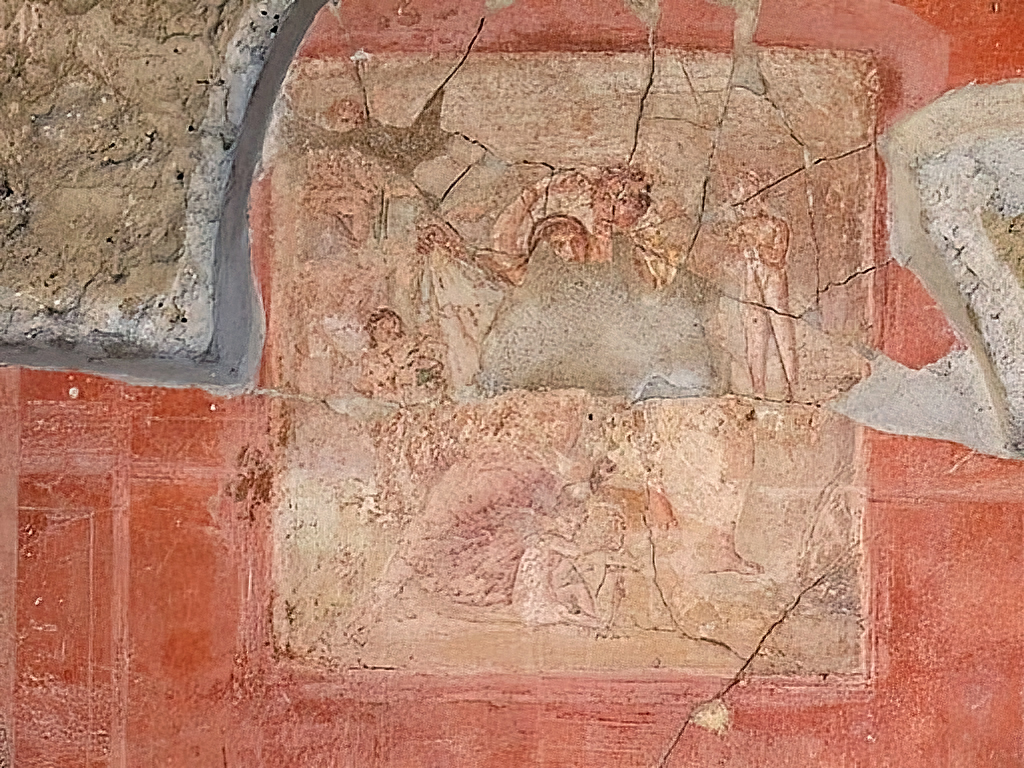
Venus at her toilette with Mars in Exedra "o"

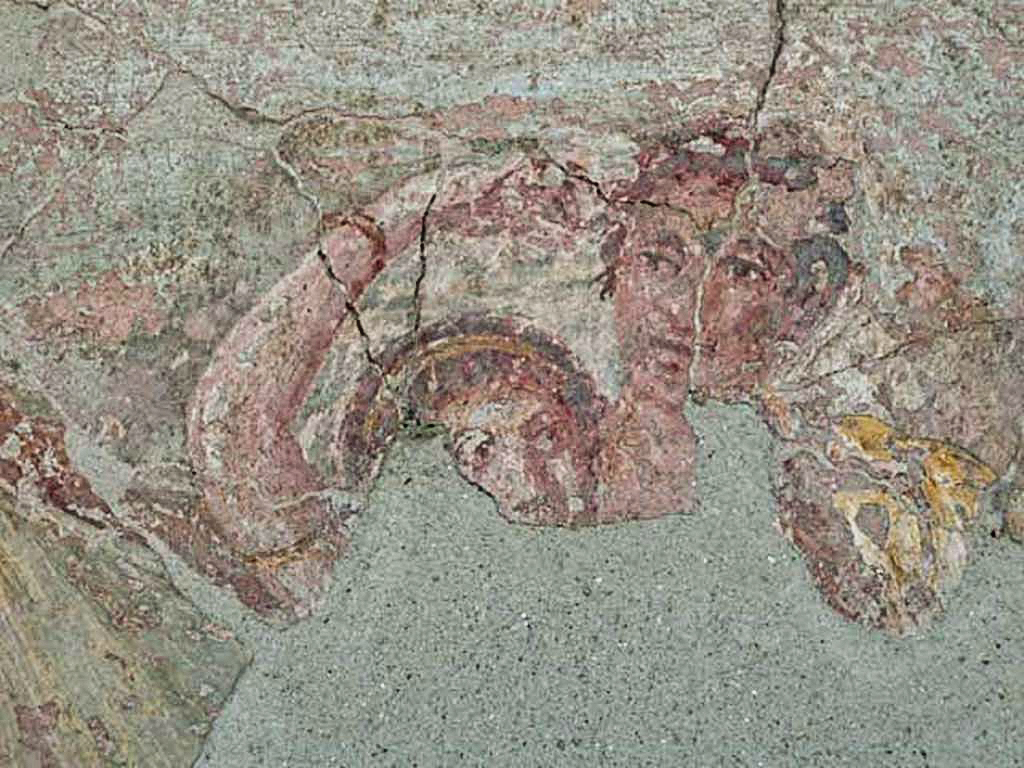
Closeup of Venus at her toilette with Mars in Exedra "o"

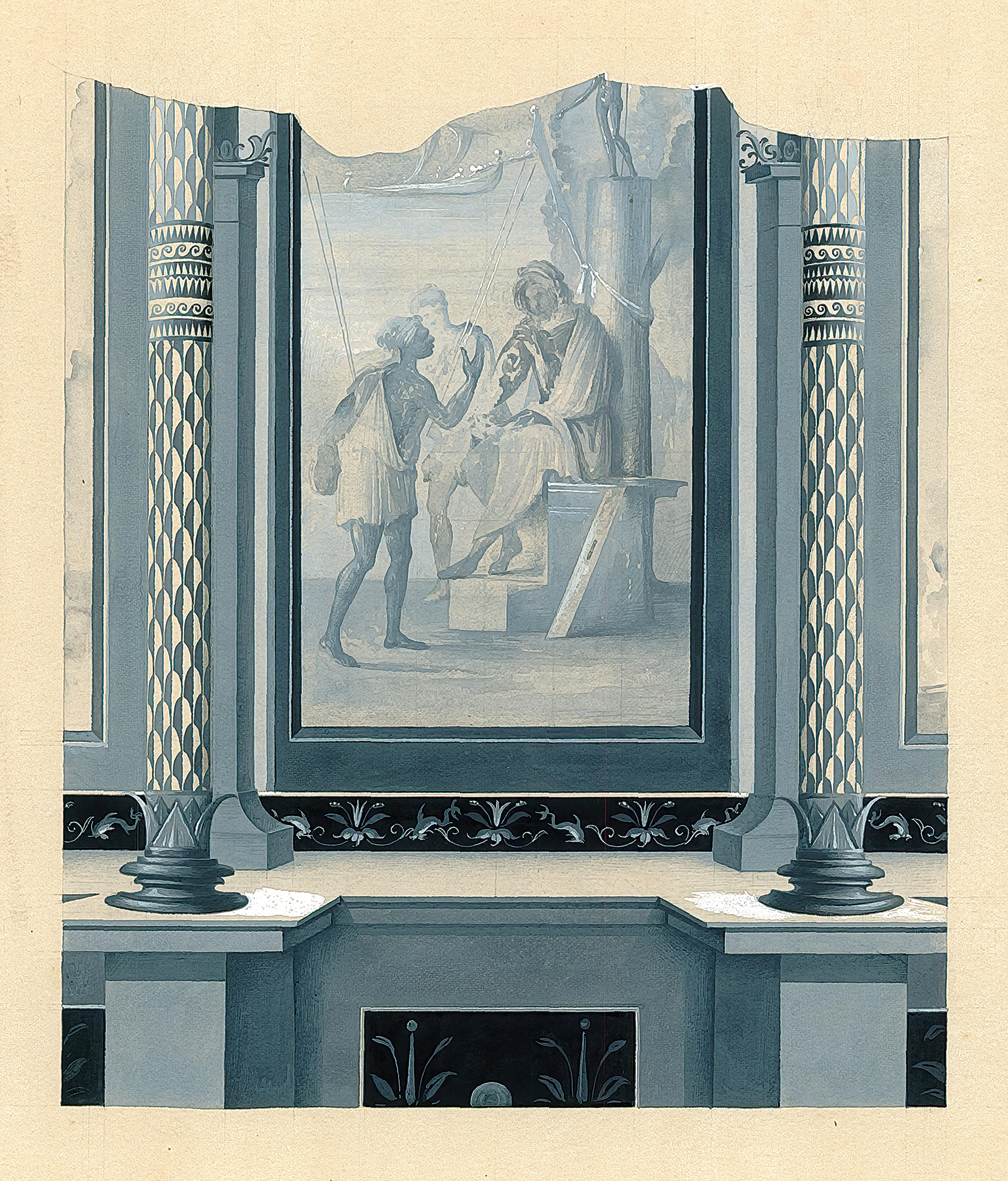
Homer with pan pipes listens to two fisherman from cubiculum "y"

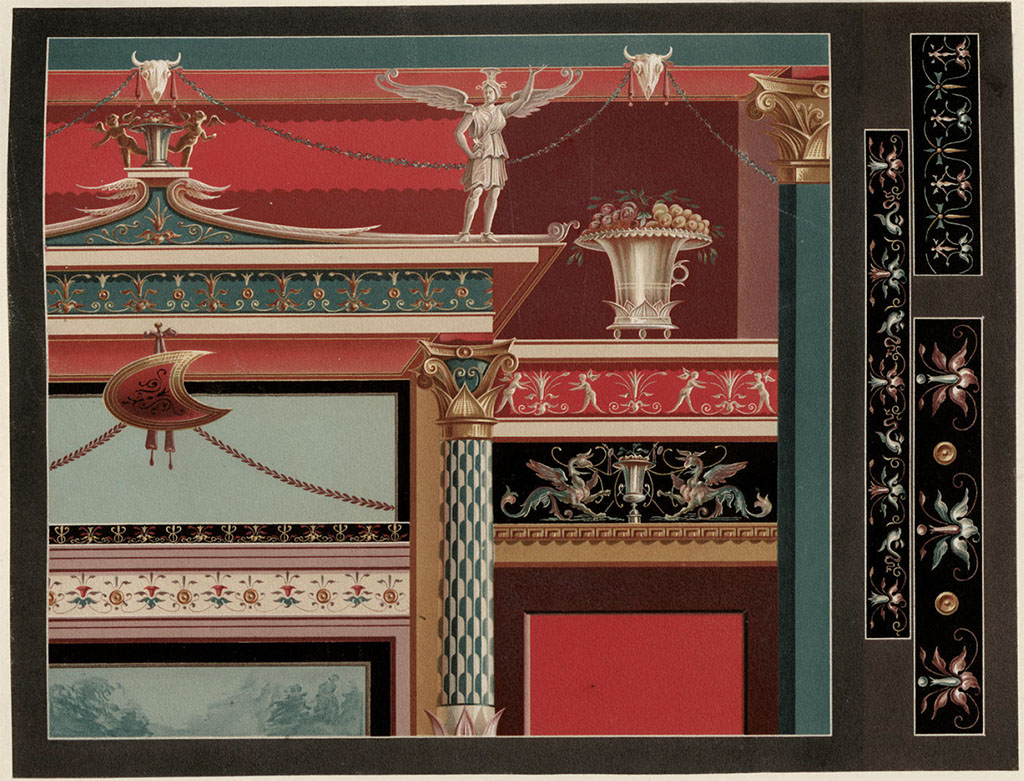
1882 painting by A Sikkard of parts of the east wall of exedra "y"

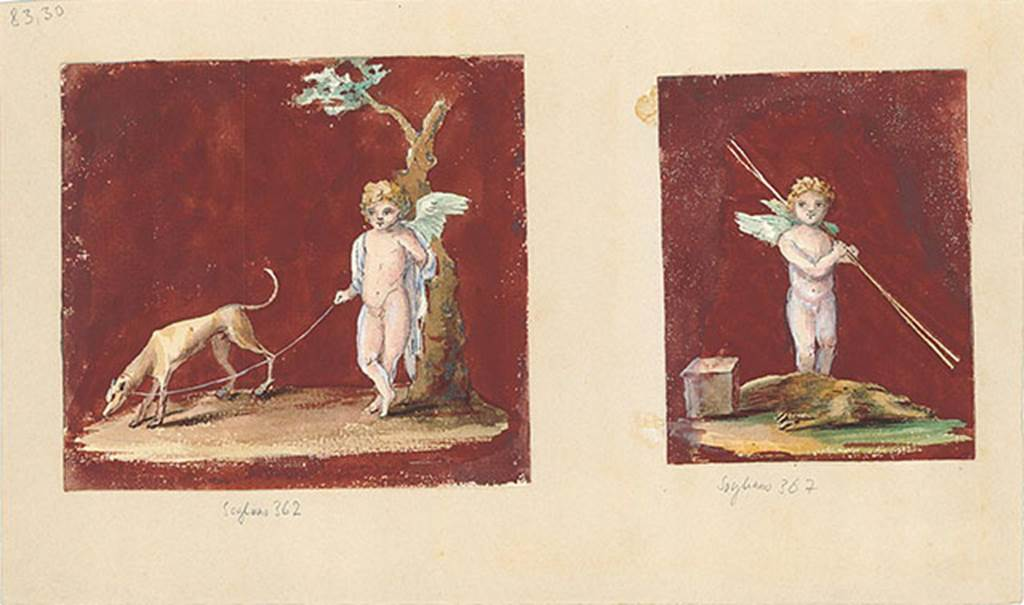
Cupid (Eros) with greyhound and with boar hunting scenes from tablinum G
