= Popina =

Ancient Roman equivalent of a bar

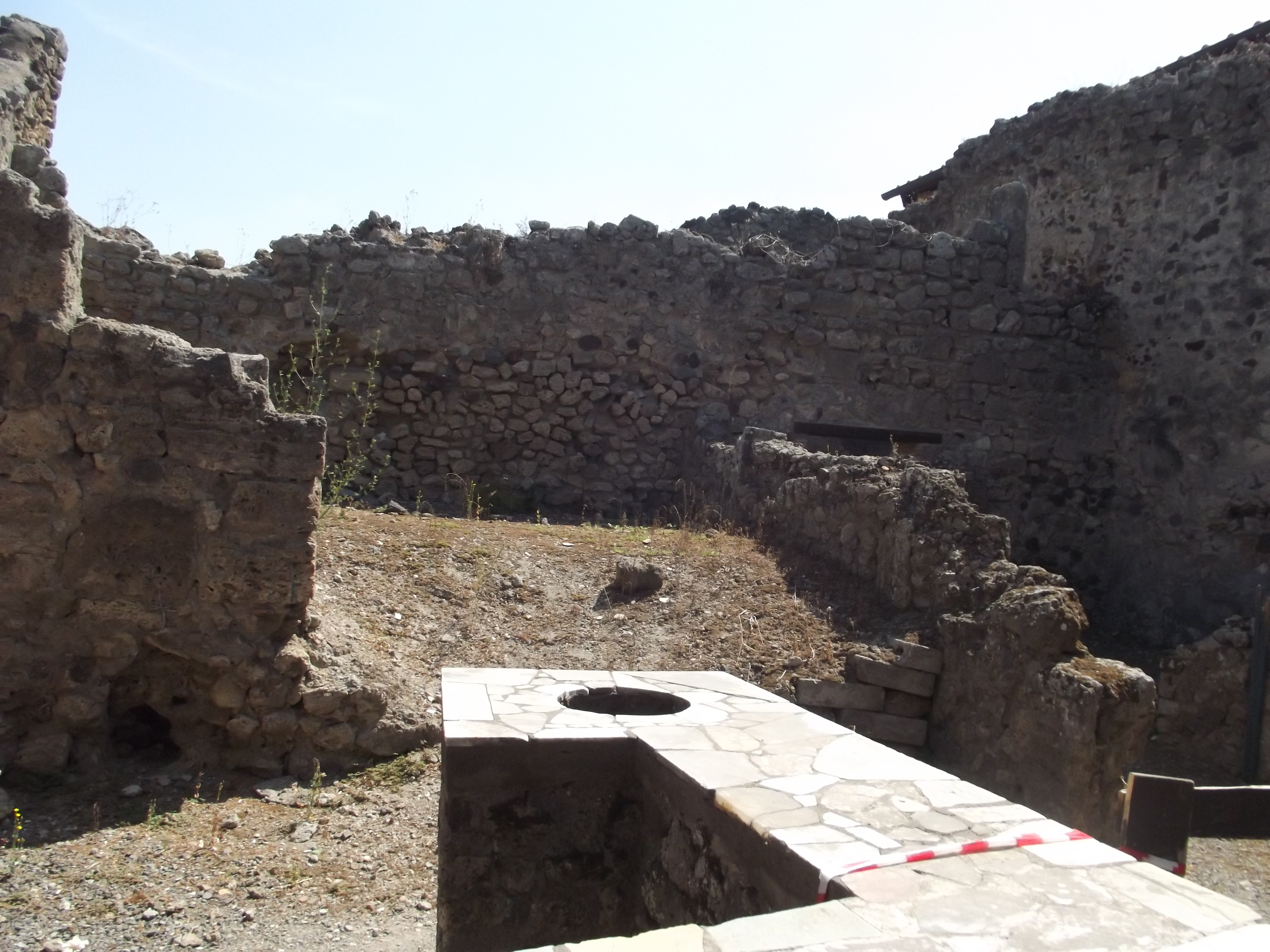
A picture of a popina in Pompeii

The popina (pl.: popinae) was an ancient Roman wine bar, where a limited menu of simple foods (olives, bread, stews) and selection of wines of varying quality were available. The popina was a place for plebeians of the lower classes of Roman society (slaves, freedmen, foreigners) to socialize; in Roman literature, they were frequently associated with illegal and immoral behavior.

== Etymology ==
The word is the Osco-Umbrian equivalent of Latin coquina, from Latin coquere "to cook".

== Features and clientele ==
Popinae were a type of wine bar generally frequented by the lower-classes and slaves, and were simply furnished with stools and tables. They provided food, drink, sex and gambling. Because they were associated with gambling and prostitution, the popinae were seen by respectable Romans as places of crime and violence. Juvenal, a 2nd-century CE Roman poet, mentions the popina to be frequented by assassins, some sailors, thieves, fugitive slaves, executioners and coffin-makers.

Although gambling with sets of dice was illegal, it would appear from the large number of dice found at cities like Pompeii that most people ignored this law. Several wall paintings from Pompeian popinae show men throwing dice from a dice shaker. Prostitutes frequented popinae, but as many of these wine bars found at Pompeii had no rooms provided with a bed, they must have met their customers at these bars then taken them elsewhere. The popina differs from the Roman caupona in that it did not provide overnight accommodation.

The popina usually fronted streets and was separated by a broad doorway. A service counter in a L or U shape would be in the main room where workers likely served customers food and drink. Frequently, a small water heater would be included into the counter or located nearby. In some popina, there would even be water basins embedded into the counter, such as in Ostia. Martial, a 1st-century Latin poet, describes a popina that had grown so massive it had occupied the entire street.

== Modern discovery ==
Physical remains of taverns and bars are found in well-preserved Roman cities. About 120 popinae were identified in Pompeii, but many of them might have been misidentified.

The taverns are often identified by evidence of storage jars set into them. However, regular shops also contained those storage jars. Some believed that the food and drink was sometimes catered when it was requested by a customer.

== See also ==
- Thermopolium
- Taberna

== Bibliography ==
- Potter, David S. (2008). A Companion to the Roman Empire. John Wiley & Sons. ISBN 978-1-4051-7826-6.
- William Stearns Davis, ed., Readings in Ancient History: Illustrative Extracts from the Sources, 2 Vols. (Boston: Allyn and Bacon, 1912–13), Vol. II: Rome and the West, pp. ??
- John DeFelice, Roman Hospitality: The Professional Women of Pompeii; Marco Polo Monographs, 2001
- Beard, Mary, The Fires of Vesuvius: Pompeii Lost and Found, Harvard University Press, 2010.
