= Thermopolium =

Ancient Greco-Roman cookshop

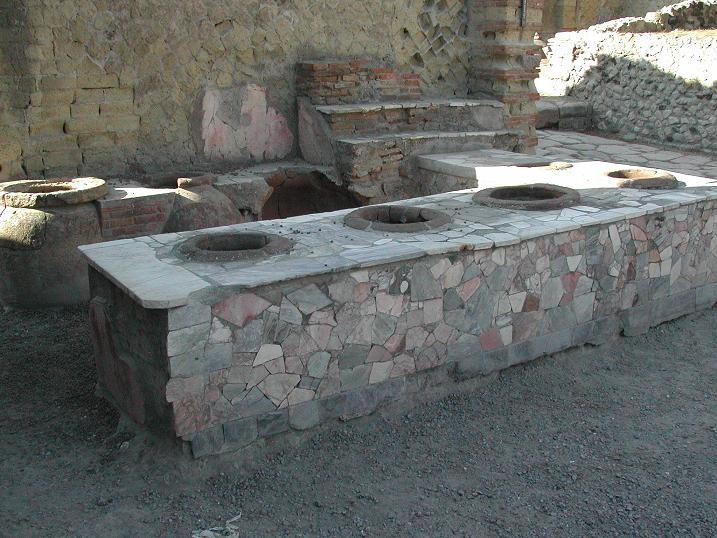
Thermopolium in Herculaneum

In the ancient Greco-Roman world, a thermopolium (pl.: thermopolia), from Greek θερμοπώλειον (thermopōlion), i.e. cook-shop, literally "a place where something hot is sold", was a commercial establishment where it was possible to purchase ready-to-eat food. In Latin literature, they are also called popinae, cauponae, hospitia or stabula, but archaeologists refer to them all as thermopolia. They were mainly used by those who did not have their own kitchens, often inhabitants of insulae, and this sometimes led to thermopolia being scorned by the upper class.

== Design ==
A typical thermopolium consists of a small room attached to, but not accessible from, a house, with a distinctive masonry counter in the front. An example can be seen in the House of the Painted Vaults in Ostia Antica. Embedded in this counter were dolia, earthenware jars used to store dried food such as nuts. A dolium in the thermopolium attached to the House of Neptune and Amphitrite in Herculaneum held the carbonized remains of nuts. Fancier thermopolia would also be decorated with frescoes. These frescoes depicted a range of Roman mythological and religious imagery, as well as images and scenes of day to day life in the ancient city. Like modern advertisement, thermopolia frescoes were not only artistically oriented, they served a practical function. The images depicted in fresco could signify what that thermopolium was selling, e.g., fish, poultry, baked goods. Thermopolia fresco would have been an important aspect in grabbing the attention of customers in the ancient city.

Well-preserved ruins of thermopolia can be seen in Pompeii, Herculaneum and Ostia.

== Thermopolium of Asellina ==
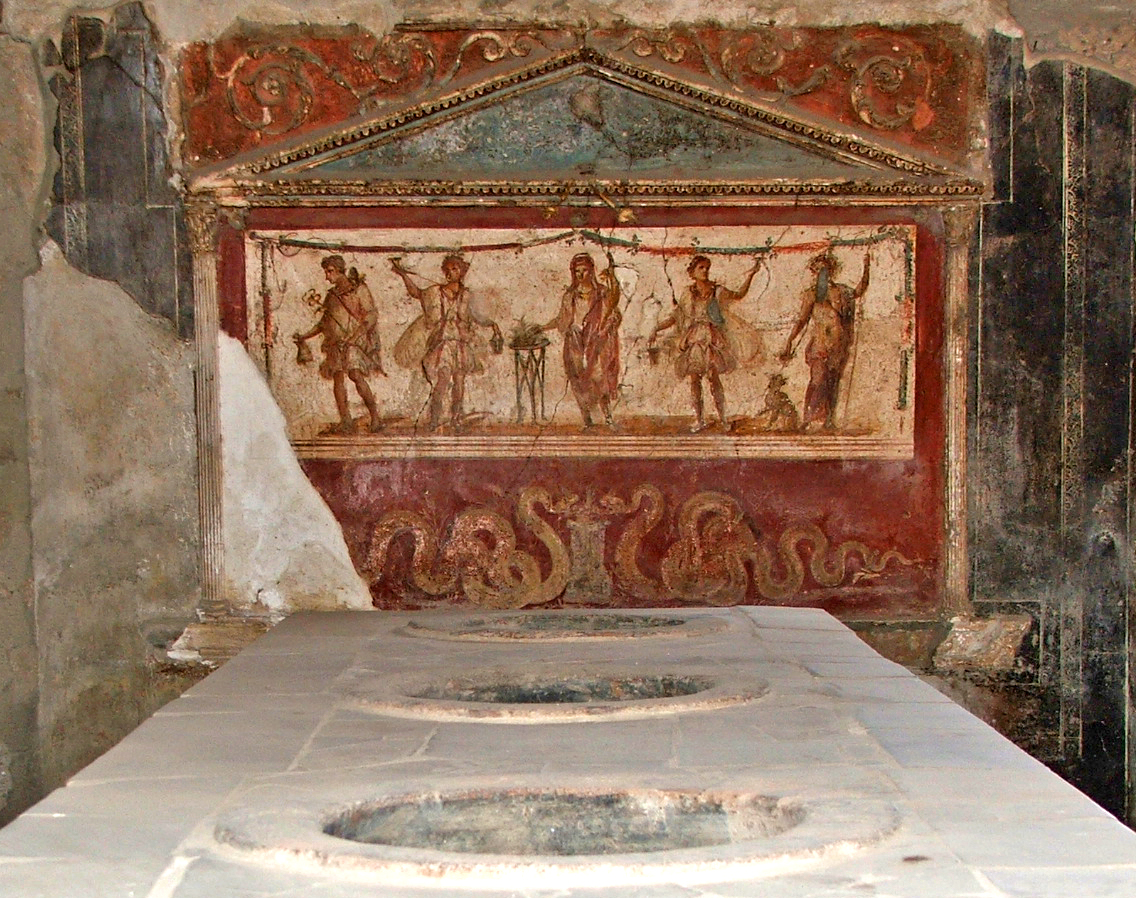
A thermopolium in Pompeii

The Thermopolium of Asellina is one of the most complete examples of a thermopolium in Pompeii. Complete jugs and dishes were found on the counter, as well as a kettle filled with water. The ground floor in the Thermopolium of Asellina was used for people to eat and drink, and some stairs led to guest rooms on the second floor.

It had a typical structure consisting of a wide doorway open to the street and a counter with holes where four jars were set into it (dolia) for food or wine. It had shrines for the Lares (household gods), Mercury (god of commerce) and Bacchus (god of wine), as these were the most important gods for this occupation. Upstairs, there were guest rooms as well, so this may have also been used as an inn. However, some think that this may have been a brothel due to the names of many women written as a part of an election notice on one of the outside walls of the thermopolium. Another theory is that these were the slave-girls who worked as barmaids. Behind the bar were remains of wooden racks suspended from the ceiling to stack amphorae.

== The Thermopolium of Regio V ==
Another Pompeiian thermopolium, containing eight dolia, was completely unearthed in 2020. In addition to frescoes reflecting foods available, one fresco depicts a dog with a collar on a leash, possibly a reminder for customers to leash their pets. The complete skeleton of an "extremely small" adult dog was also discovered that "attest to selective breeding in the Roman epoch to obtain this result." Archaeologists have also discovered remains of food in some of the deep terracotta jars. Other discoveries include a drink shop, a decorated bronze drinking bowl known as a patera, wine flasks, amphora, and ceramic jars used for cooking stews and soups.

== Other thermopolia ==
- Caupona of Euxinus
- Caupona of Salvius
- Inn of Hermes
- Thermopolium of the Via Diana

== See also ==
- Tabernae
