= Dolium =

Ancient Roman pottery container

A dolium (plural: dolia) is a large earthenware vase or vessel used in ancient Roman times for the fermentation of alcoholic beverages, as well as storage or transportation of goods. They are similar to kvevri, large Georgian vessels used to ferment wine.

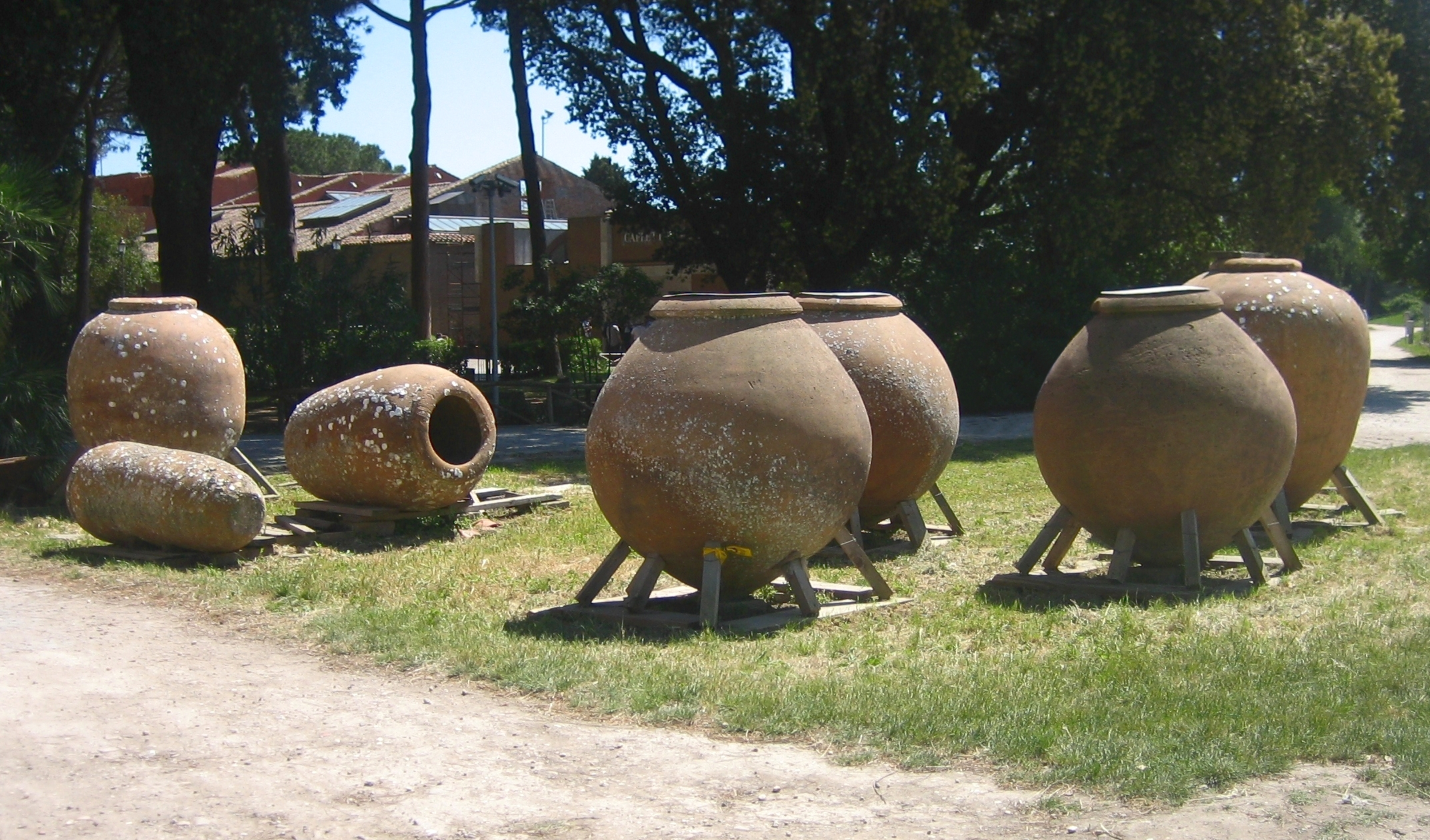
Dolia at Ostia Antica

Also used as urine containers in ancient rome in houses of multi occupation.

== Description ==
The dolium was a large jug or container made of fired clay. Oval in shape, with a wide mouth and rim, it was much larger than the amphora, a similar pottery container. The dolium had no neck or handles and, in many cases, could measure up to six feet in height. Some dolia have a rounded body tapering into a flat bottom, while more frequently, dolia maintained a rounded bottom. They were lined with pitch or wax in order to contain or process liquids and solid foods. Some sources mention dolia holding up to 50 quadrantals, equivalent to 346.5 US gallons (1,312 litres). There was no standard size for dolia.

== History ==
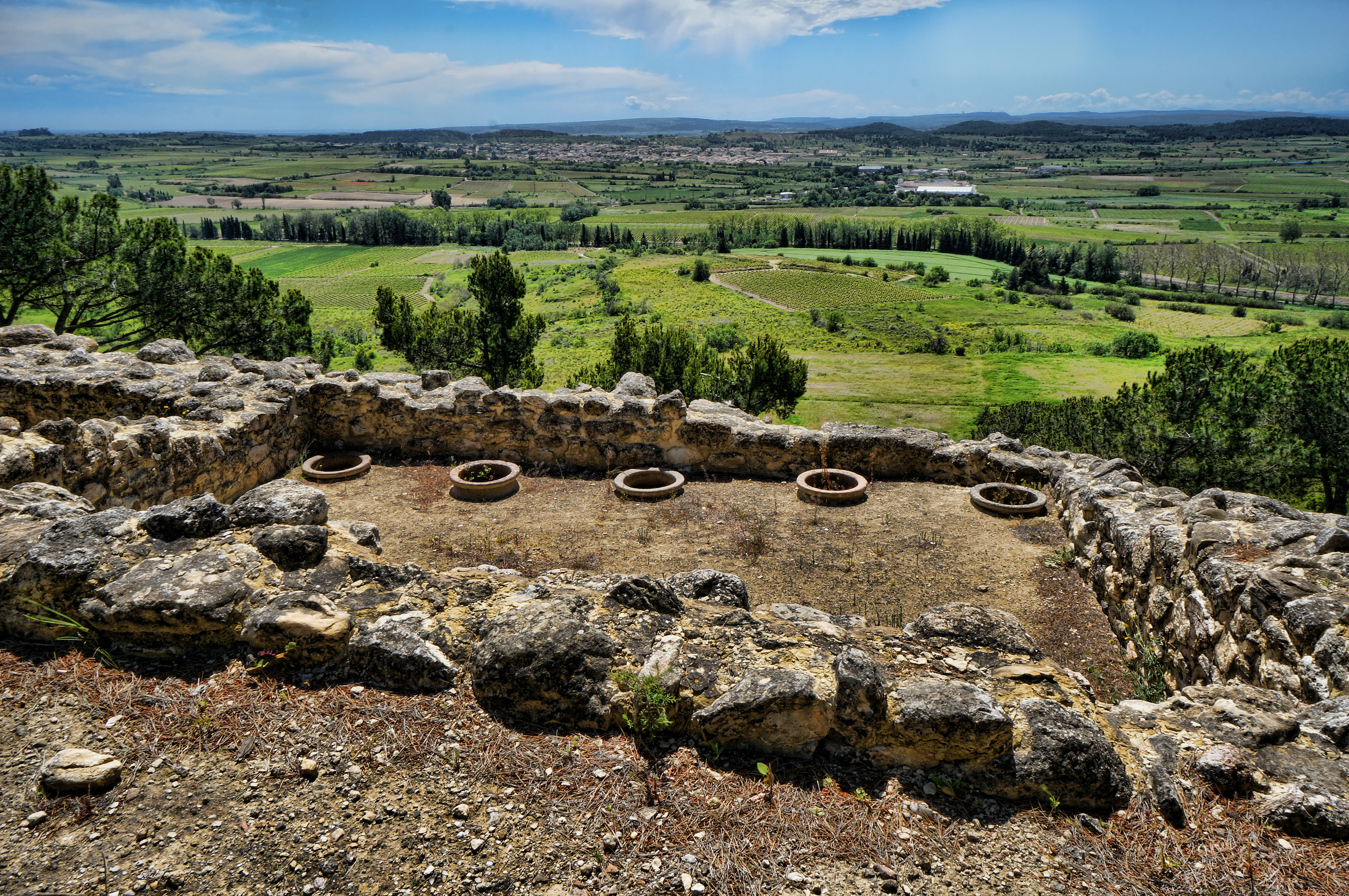
Dolia, earthenware storage jars for grain and other agricultural products embedded in the ground at the Oppidum d'Ensérune, France

Much of what modern scholars know about the dolium comes from ancient Latin literature. Sources which address agriculture, significantly De agri cultura by Cato the Elder, Res rustica by Varro, Res rustica by Columella, and the Res rustica by Palladius, help us determine the size, appearance and purposes of the dolia. Because these sources deal with rural matters of the time, they also give scholars an insight into the life and culture of ancient Rome in addition to specific information about use of the dolium. Another noteworthy source is the Digest of Justinian I. It is a collection of quotations from earlier works of Roman jurists that discuss the importance of the integration of dolia in ancient Roman society. These sources, along with a variety of other less significant sources where dolia are only briefly mentioned, characterize the dolia as the largest type of earthenware vessel made by the Romans.

== Use and purpose ==
There is evidence to support the claim of many classical archaeologists that dolia were used exclusively on land for the processing and storage of foodstuffs. For instance, dolia were manufactured for the most part by travelling specialist potters or by workshops that were involved principally in production of architectural ceramics. Dolia were used in food production areas, such as farmhouses, and selling points like taverns and town warehouses. Dolia were also used in theatres for their acoustic qualities (presumably for special sound effects).

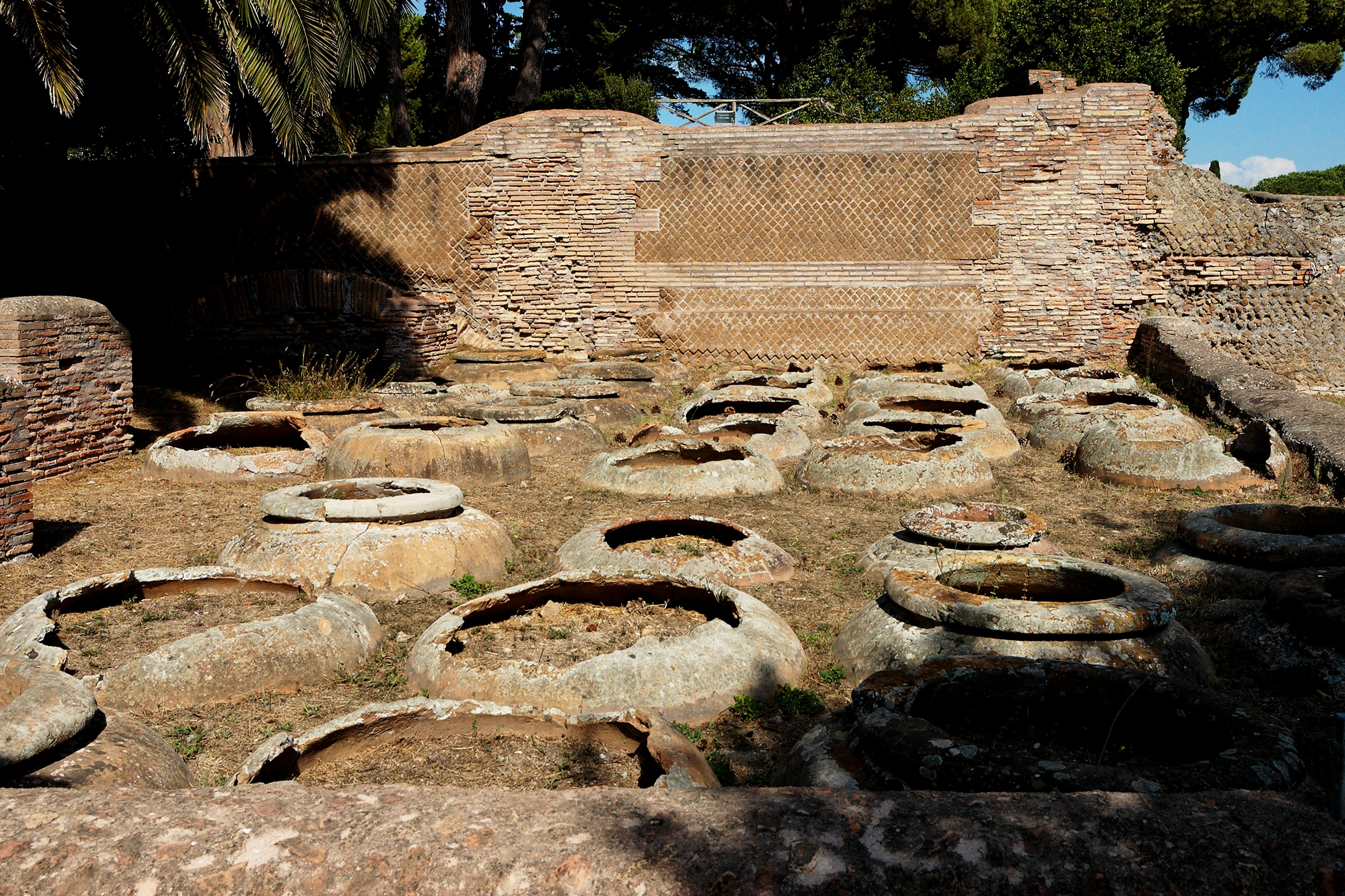
Storing-rooms with jars, Caseggiato dei dolii (Ostia Antica), Italy

The two methods of storing dolia were to either bury them half way in the ground or standing under a roof. They were used to hold goods such as wine, grape husks, olive oil, amurca, wheat, and other common grains. Many dolia hold record amounts of 40-50 quadrantals (quadrantals being the general amount held in one amphora). Unlike the amphora, the dolium was not regarded as an accessory and sold along with the wine that it contained. Rather, dolia were fixed facilities not employed for the distribution of wine. Its major purpose was for the permanent storage capacity of goods.

However, dolia were also commonly used in conjunction with transport facilities such as merchant ships and temporary storage places like harbor warehouses. Surprisingly, given their construction, dolia were often used in overseas transport. Recent archaeological discoveries indicate two or three rows of dolia were sometimes positioned along the keel of a merchant ship, apparently cemented in place to prevent shifting with the ship's movement at sea. This technique allowed dolia to serve as fixed receptacles for the transport of wine. The high prices of dolia is evidence to indicate that their incorporation into maritime transportation represented a substantial investment of funds. Also, given their great weight and bulk, replacement must have represented both an inconvenience and an expense. Thus, extraordinary caution must have been employed when handling the dolia to preserve and maintain their useful life.

Ethnographic research indicates that in many cases dolia remained in use for several decades, and therefore, it seems plausible to suggest that dolia regularly remained in prime use for up to 20–30 years and perhaps longer.

== Dolia in maritime commerce ==
=== Positions of dolia in ships ===
While the mystery of the dolia in relation to maritime commerce is still being researched, archaeologists have substantial evidence from shipwrecks to support its significant, yet short role. One of the most striking evidences of the use of dolia in the commerce of food supplies is their presence on board Roman merchant ships. There have been at least seven shipwrecks discovered carrying dolia, dating between the 1st century BC and the 3rd century AD. Three of the most interesting and identifiable shipwrecks that lend themselves to study of dolia are the Diano Marina, the Petit Congloue, and the La Giraglia shipwrecks.

The Diano Marina shipwreck (IM, Liguria, Italy) was discovered with fifteen dolia still intact. Its relatively deep underwater location provided sufficient protection from both natural and human disturbances to allow for a more detailed study on the position of dolia on board this Roman merchant ship. The dolia from this shipwreck were found to be of two different shapes, corresponding to two different positions on board the ship. Four long, cylindrical dolia were located in a line along the keel of the ship, while ten shorter, more rounded dolia were divided into two lines and laid alongside the central dolia. This type of disposition seems to be related to the structure of the ship and most likely implies that the lips of all the dolia were lying at an even level. The preservation of the Diano Marina's entire cargo provides a rare chance to estimate the capacity of Roman ships. Based on the calculations of the capacity of the central cylindrical dolia and the surrounding rounded dolia on board, the total capacity of the dolia on board the “Diano Marina” would have been approximately 9,500 gallons.

The Petit Congloue shipwreck (Marseille, Bouches-du-Rhone, Provence, France) was discovered in a similar environment as the Diano Marina shipwreck. Its relatively deep underwater location sufficiently protected the site from disturbances as well, which also allowed for a more detailed study on the position of dolia on board this Roman merchant ship. However, in the Petit Congloue shipwreck, the dolia are all unfortunately silted up to their shoulders, making it impossible to distinguish their different shapes. But their disposition clearly shows the same pattern of three lines parallel to the keel as in the Diano Marina shipwreck, which allows us to further specify that the vases in each line were actually sized compared to the ones in the neighboring line. Even though this shipwreck does not allow study of the shapes of these particular dolia, the sporadic recovery of single dolia from the sea without their known origins basically shows two different and distinct shapes: cylindrical or rounded.

=== Construction of dolia ships ===
The La Giraglia shipwreck, discovered off the coast of Corsica, France, is particularly interesting because it is officially recognized as a cistern boat. This type of vessel was intended to transport dolia in bulk as the dolia appear to have been placed in the hold as the ship was being built. The La Giraglia was carrying at least eight dolia and its excavation gives insight into the ship’s design and how such vessels contributed to patterns of trade in the western Mediterranean. The cistern boat was an innovation in ship construction, intended to respond to changes in the production and transportation of wine brought about by Roman expansion. The cistern boat began being built during the Augustan Period, and continued until the 2nd century. The relatively short period of production for this ship-type suggests that there were problems with its design which caused the design to be superseded. Because each discovery illuminates the ways in which maritime commerce adapted to the demands of production and transportation, the La Giraglia shipwreck is essential in the understanding of mutual exchange within the Mediterranean.

As this dolia ship came to a very traumatic ending, there is little left to be excavated and studied of the hull. The hull planking is also poorly preserved, but there were, however, thirteen strakes that may serve for extrapolation to the design of the entire ship. The strakes were fastened together by pegged mortise and tenon joinery and assembled in the classic shell-first construction. The spacing between mortises and the width of the mortises is very tight and they also appear to be slightly wider than the tenons. It is believed that the space left within the mortises was intended to compensate for possible misalignment of opposite mortises. It appears that they were arranged in a straight line, rather than alternating from the inboard to the outboard edge and the back inboard in order to prevent the wood from splitting. Twenty-six frames were also identified and recorded from the La Giraglia dolia shipwreck. The large quantity of nails indicates their significance as a strengthening element in the assemblage of the frames with the planking.

The La Giraglia was a medium-sized ship, but possessed a few rather unusual characteristics because the discovery and study of the twenty-six frames reveal that 58.8% of the preserved hull was composed of oak. The use of oak solely for the hull planking has never before been seen in the Mediterranean. However, given the fragmented nature of the remaining wreck, this preponderance of oak in the surviving portions may not reflect the composition of the rest of the original ship. It could have perhaps only been used for the bottom of the hull, which would certainly be an interesting characteristic for such cistern boats. The ship builder might have thought it necessary to use this hardwood because the weight of the cargo was concentrated in the center section of the ship. Overall, there were six species of wood used in the construction of the La Giraglia: oak was used for the frames and tenons, beech and elm also for the frames, ash made up the small pegs used in the hull planking, and fir and two other types of oak. The shipwright obviously knew how to use the available species appropriately for the construction of the different structures and elements of the ship.

“Whatever the answers to the numerous questions raised about the dolia vessels or cistern boats, these ships must be considered not only as a technical innovation of their time, but also as a daring enterprise. The presence of huge containers in the hold presented an obvious and real danger. The rupture of a full dolium would have caused almost two tons of wine to pour rapidly into the hold, which could have resulted in a sudden destabilization and capsizing of the vessel. In spite of the advantages of dolia over amphoras, the obvious risks may explain why cistern boats disappeared”.

=== Recent discovery ===
A new dolia shipwreck has recently been discovered on the seabed just off the coast of the Tuscan island of Elba. The contents of the Roman ship were perfectly preserved, containing nine intact dolia that measured two meters high and five meters round. Experts estimate the ship to be about twenty-two meters in length and date back to the time of the first Roman empire. "This is the first time a complete, inviolate wreck has been found," Michelangelo Zecchini, an archaeologist who works for the Forum UNESCO commented. "However in itself just the number of containers and their superb condition makes this a truly astounding discovery”. Excavation remains slow and tedious as the shipwreck lies under a meter of lime, but archeologists are hoping that this discovery will provide valuable information and details about the layout and cargo of the ship, as well as cargo ships like it. Doing so will help historians better understand and study the shipping routes of the Mediterranean in antiquity.

ProMare, a non-profit organization that promotes marine discovery and archeology around the globe, is currently heading up the excavation process. It began on September 2, 2008 and represents current attempts to use modern technology in the excavation process. So far, it has been discovered that the ship was carrying ten dolia with a capacity of 400-450 gallons each. The project plans to continue excavating the site in 2009 with the use of a custom-built remotely operated vehicle.

=== Conclusions ===
Study and analysis of shipboard use of dolia on Roman merchant ships indicates a strong similarity to how dolia were used on land. “It seems that dolia were made in a shape that allowed them to fit perfectly inside a ship in order to leave minimal empty space. The central row was composed of the highest cylindrical dolia, while the two other lines, laid on both sides of the central one, were composed of shorter and more rounded vases. The very tight disposition of the dolia has led to the deduction that these containers were never removed from their places on board ship and that when they carried wine, it had to be poured in and out at the ports-of-call. This conclusion is supported by the fact that all the dolia found on Roman port buildings were imbedded in the ground, and therefore were also irremovable.”

In terms of maritime commerce, two assumptions about dolia presented: one, dolia were intended to carry wine and two, they were irremovable within the ships that carried them. This is supported by an ambiguous passage of Latin text from Pliny’s Digest that talks about wine being poured for ships specialized for wine. This would support the conclusion that ships carrying dolia were specifically transporting only wine.

“Perhaps one of the most interesting results of the search for information on dolia is the fact that they have been found in considerable quantities in every step of a system of food supply which was related to the overseas trade. In fact, the archaeological evidence confirms the existence of a commercial organization, which would buy a certain food commodity, most likely wine, stored in dolia… In a second step the same commodity may have been further transported to other dolia in other warehouses located closer to possible buyers… All the archaeological and literary evidence support this vision” of the role of dolia in maritime commerce.

== Bibliography ==
- “La Nave ‘A Dolia’ di Diano Marina,” https://web.archive.org/web/20090403124259/http://www.sullacrestadellonda.it/archeo/dianoindex.htm (28 April 2009).
- “Mystery of seabed resolved with 2,000 year old ship’s discovery.” The Roman Hideout. http://www.romanhideout.com/news/2002/irna20020824.asp (Dated 15 August 2002; Access date: 26 April 2009).
- Brenni, G. M. R. 1985. “The Dolia and the Sea-Borne Commerce of Imperial Rome.” MA thesis, Texas A&M University.
- Gambogi, P., et al. 2008. “Dolia Shipwreck.” Promare: Promoting Marine Research and Exploration. https://web.archive.org/web/20090412095140/http://www.promare.org/project_doliashipwreck.html (26 April 2009).
- Marlier, S. and P. Sibella. 2002, “La Giraglia, a dolia wreck of the 1st century BC from Corsica, France: study of its hull remains.” International Journal of Nautical Archaeology 31.2: 161-71.
- Pena, T. J. 2007. Roman Pottery In The Archaeological Record. New York: Cambridge University Press. 20, 46-49.
