= Erotic art in Pompeii and Herculaneum =

Aspect of art in ancient Rome

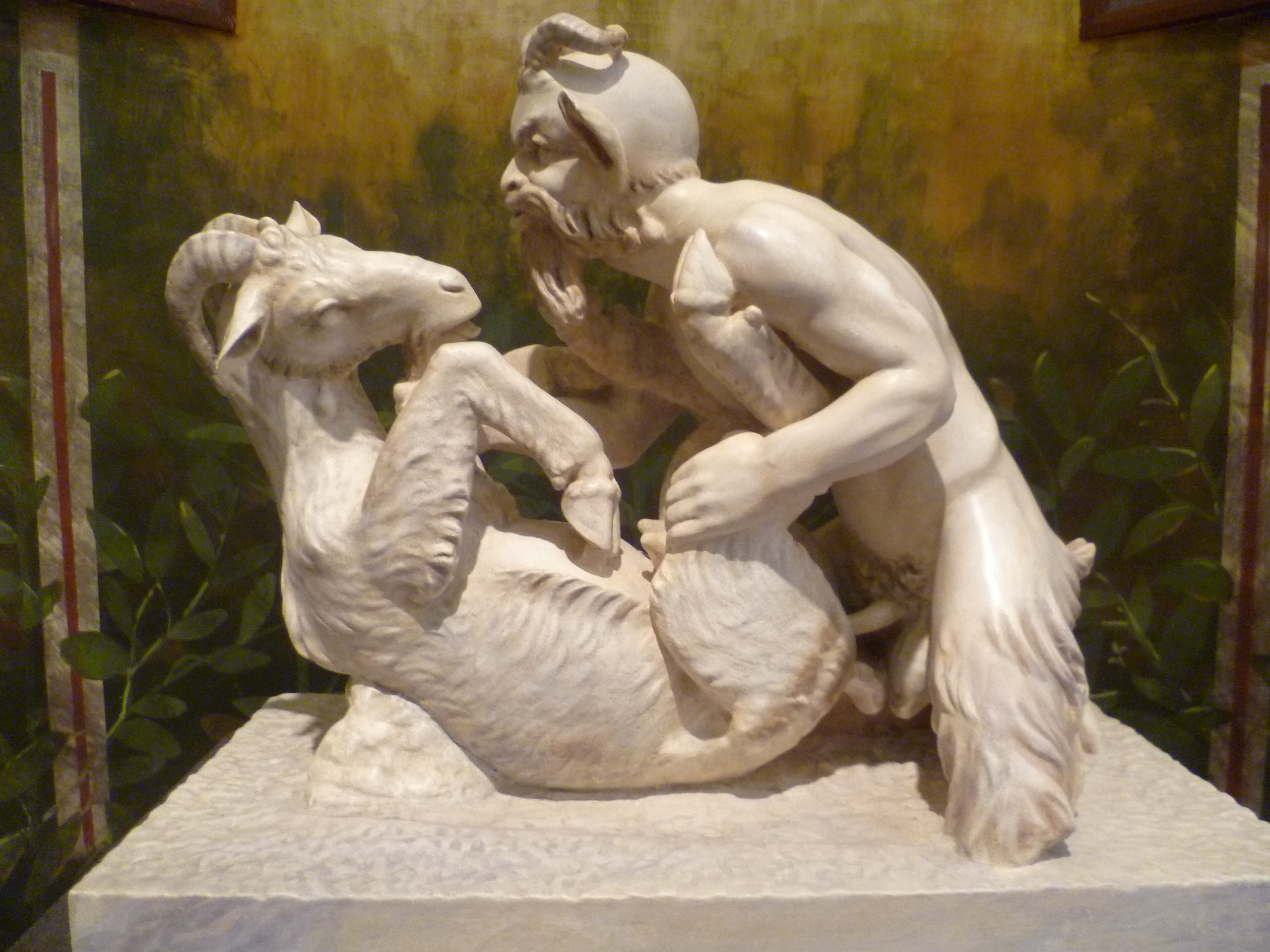
Sex between Pan and a goat. From the Herculaneum villa of the Papyri. National Archaeological Museum, Naples. Marble. 1st century BCE - 1st century CE

Erotic art in Pompeii and Herculaneum has been both exhibited as art and censored as pornography. The Roman cities of Pompeii and Herculaneum around the bay of Naples were destroyed by the eruption of Mount Vesuvius in 79 AD, thereby preserving their buildings and artefacts until extensive archaeological excavations began in the 18th century. These digs revealed the cities to be rich in erotic artefacts such as statues, frescoes, and household items decorated with sexual themes.

The ubiquity of such imagery and items indicates that the treatment of sexual iconography in ancient Rome was more relaxed than in current Western culture. The creation of erotic art in ancient Rome is thought to have occurred over seven centuries from the first century BCE to the fifth or sixth century CE.

Much of what might strike modern viewers as erotic imagery, such as oversized phalluses, could arguably be fertility imagery. Depictions of the phallus, for example, could be used in gardens to encourage the production of fertile plants.

This clash of cultures led to many erotic artefacts from Pompeii being locked away from the public for nearly 200 years. In 1819, when King Francis I of Naples visited the Pompeii exhibition at the Naples National Archaeological Museum with his wife and daughter, he was embarrassed by the erotic artwork and ordered it to be locked away in a "secret cabinet", accessible only to "people of mature age and respected morals". Re-opened, closed, re-opened again and then closed again for nearly 100 years, the Secret Museum, Naples was briefly made accessible at the end of the 1960s (the time of the sexual revolution) and was finally re-opened for viewing in 2000. Minors are still only allowed entry to the once-secret cabinet in the presence of a guardian, or with written permission.

== Phalluses ==
The phallus (the erect penis), whether on Pan, Priapus or a similar deity, or on its own, was a common image. It was not seen as threatening or even necessarily erotic, but as a ward against the evil eye. The phallus was sculpted in bronze as tintinnabula (wind chimes). Phallus-animals were common household items.

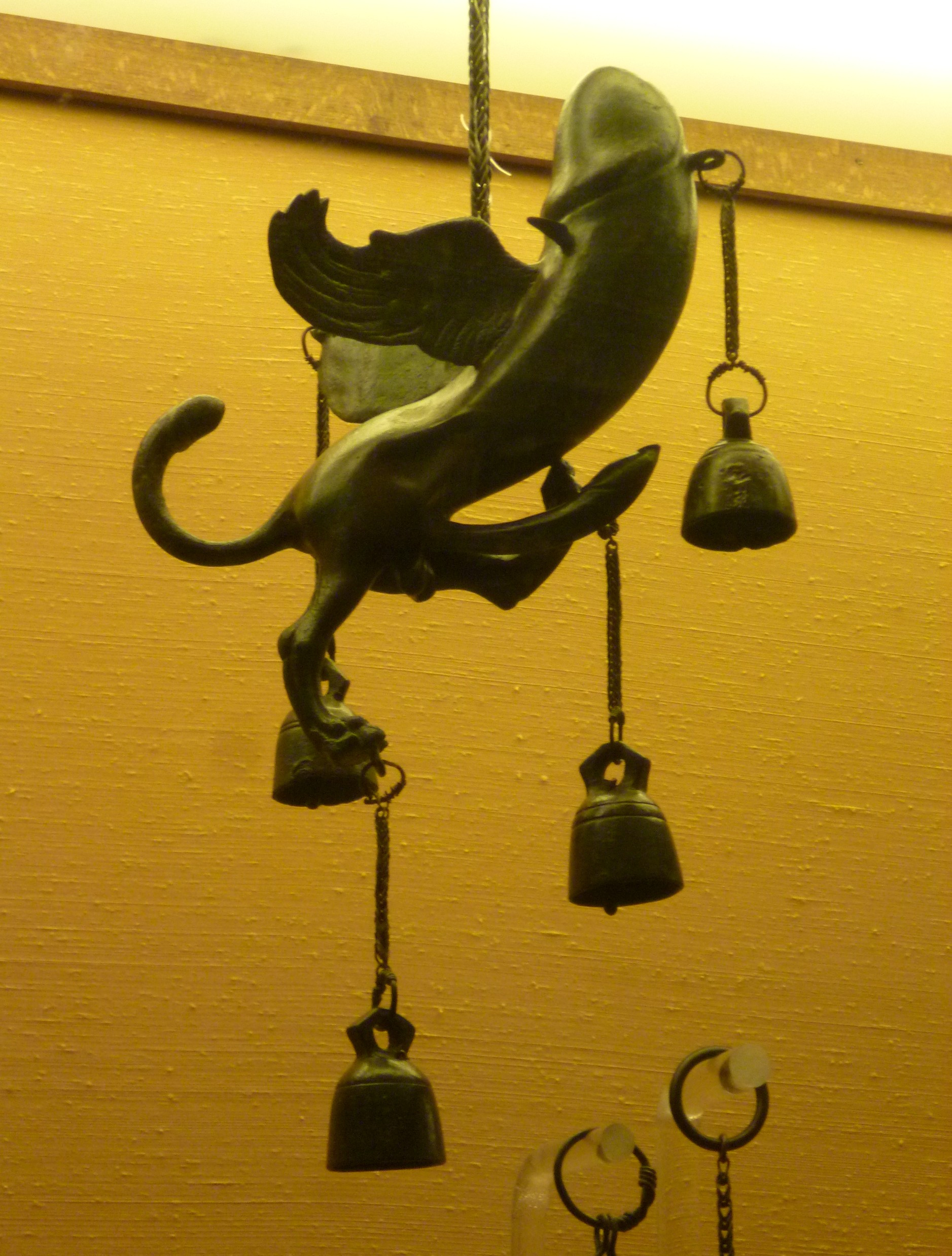
Bronze tintinabulum; phallus in the form of a winged lion, with suspended chimes. 1st Century BCE

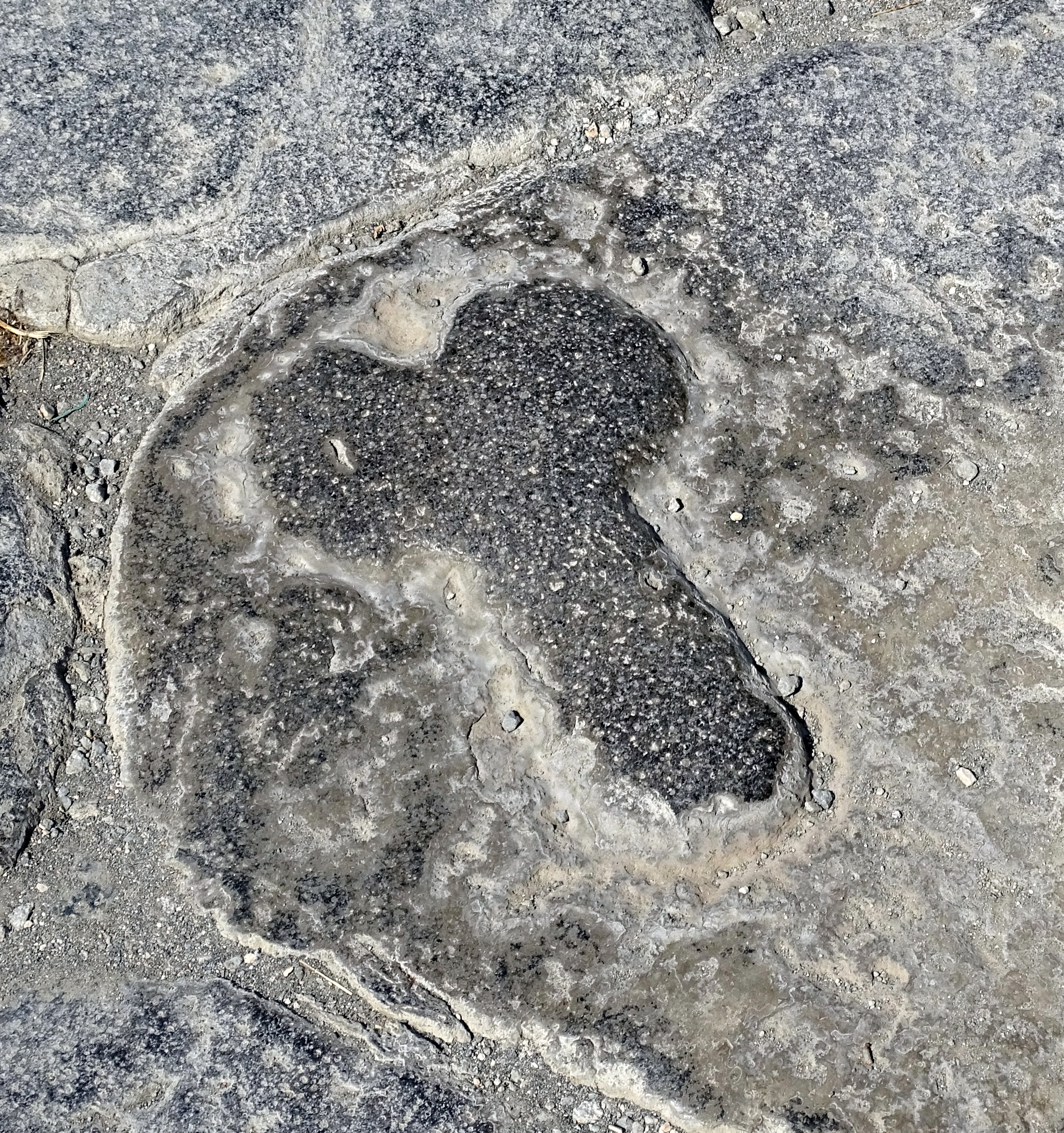
Relief of a Phallus on a lava paving stone showing directions to a brothel on the Via dell' Abbondanza. Pompeii.

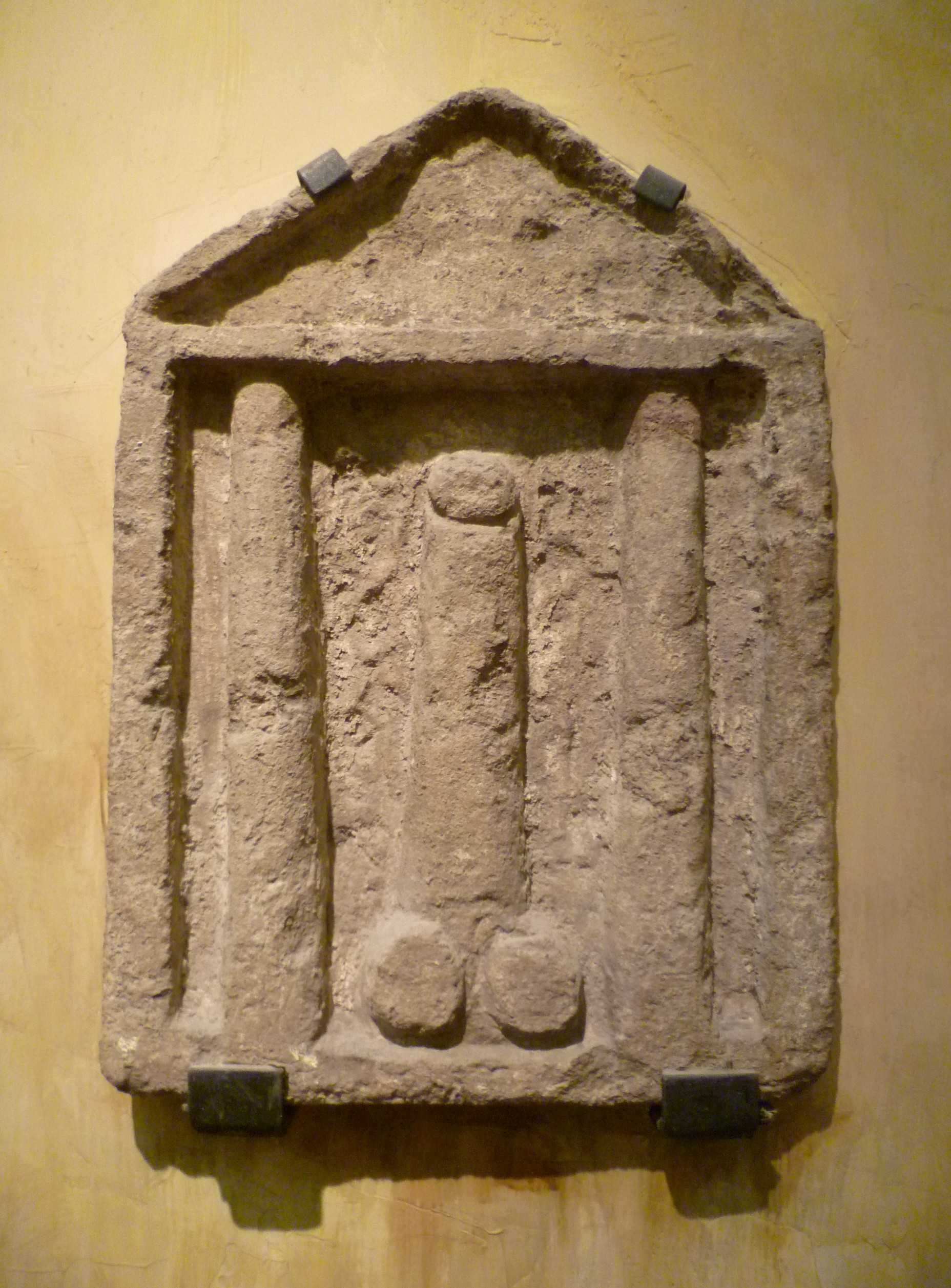
Phallus relief from Pompeii, c. 1–50 AD

== Priapus ==
A wall fresco which depicted Priapus, the god of sex and fertility, with his oversized erection, was covered with plaster (and, as Karl Schefold explains, even the older reproduction below was locked away "out of prudishness" and only opened on request) and only rediscovered in 1998 due to rainfall. The Romans believed that he was a talisman protecting the riches of the house.

The second image, from Schefold, Karl: Vergessenes Pompeji: Unveröffentlichte Bilder römischer Wanddekorationen in geschichtlicher Folge. München 1962., with its much more brilliant colors, has been used to retouch the younger, higher resolution image here.

A statuette of Priapus in the House of the Vettii in Pompeii is from a small cubicle leading off from the kitchen. It is thought the statue used to be placed in the garden and was used as a fountain. A hole runs through its phallus allowing it to spurt like a fountain. Also in this room where the statue was located were erotic paintings.

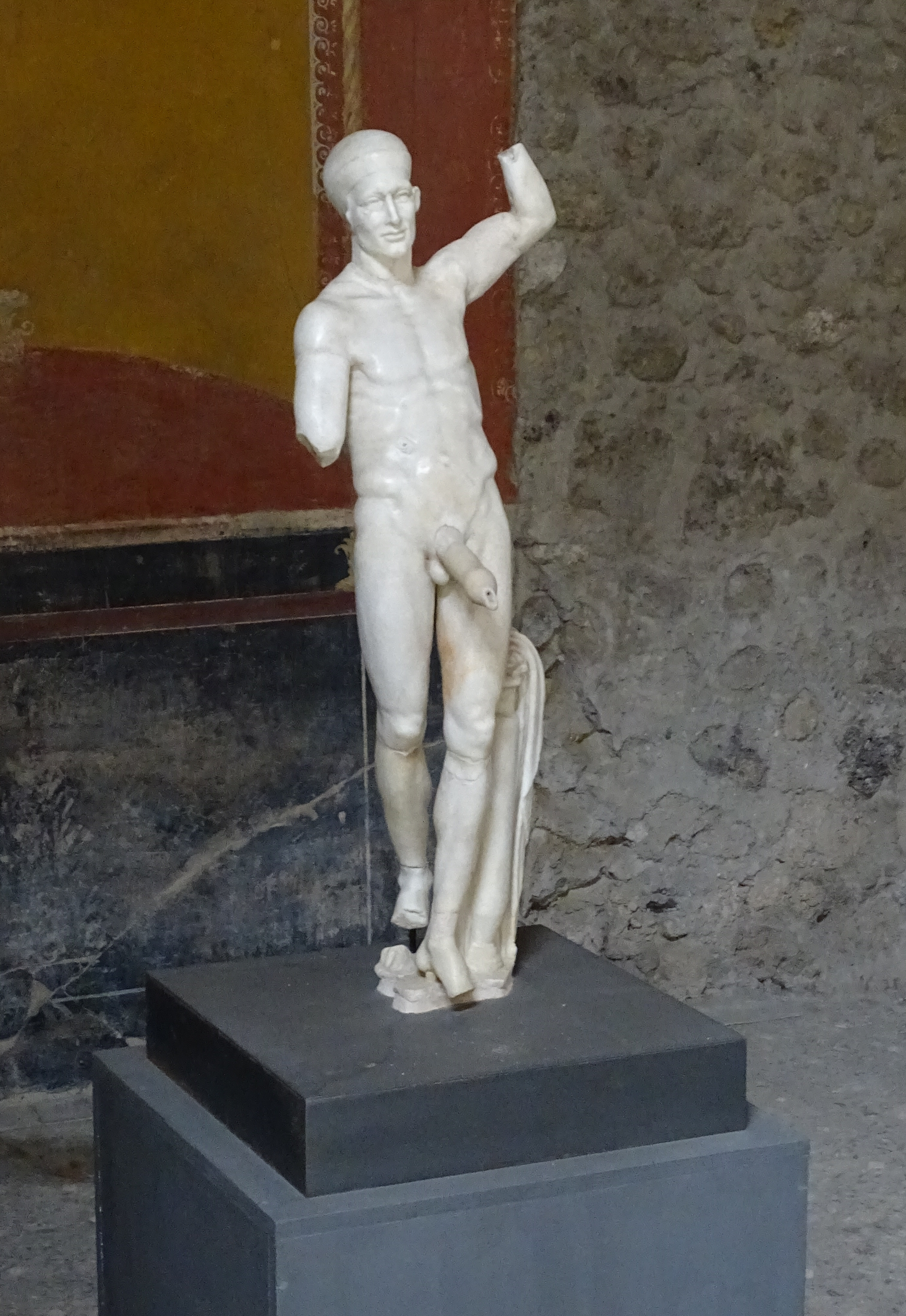
A statuette of Priapus in the House of the Vettii. A hole runs through its phallus allowing it to spurt like a fountain.

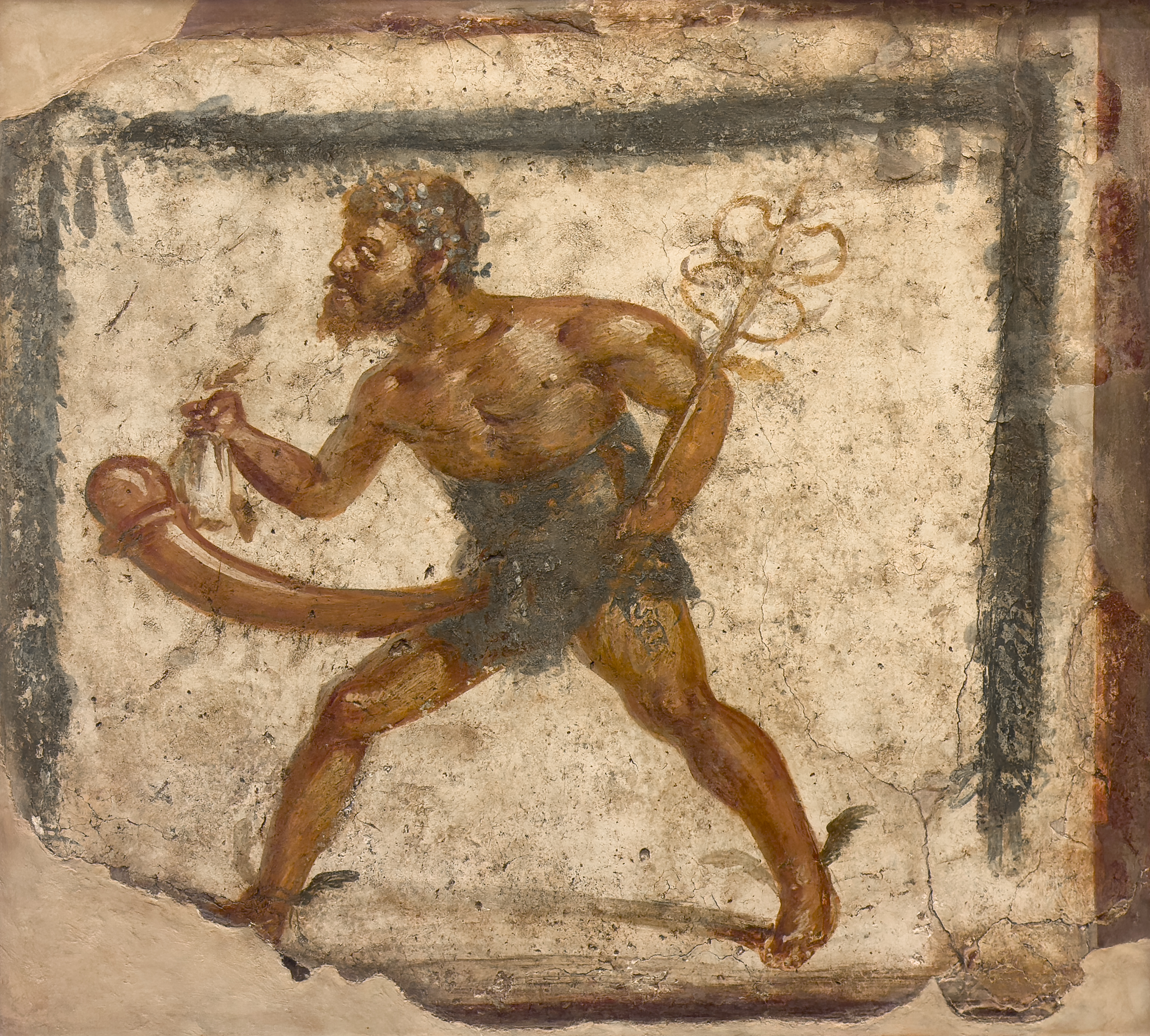
Wall mural of Mercury/Priapus

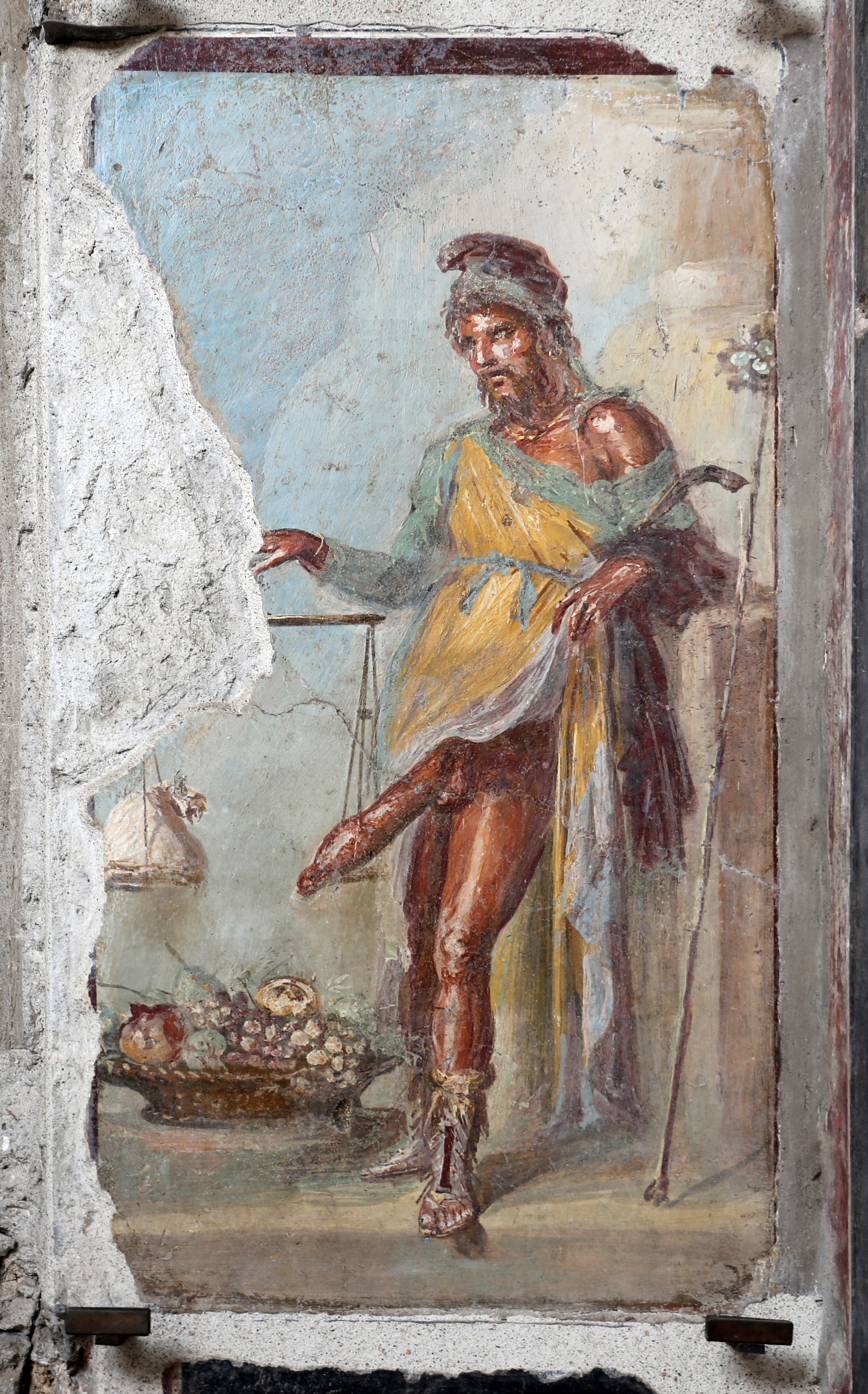
Wall Painting of Priapus, House of the Vettii

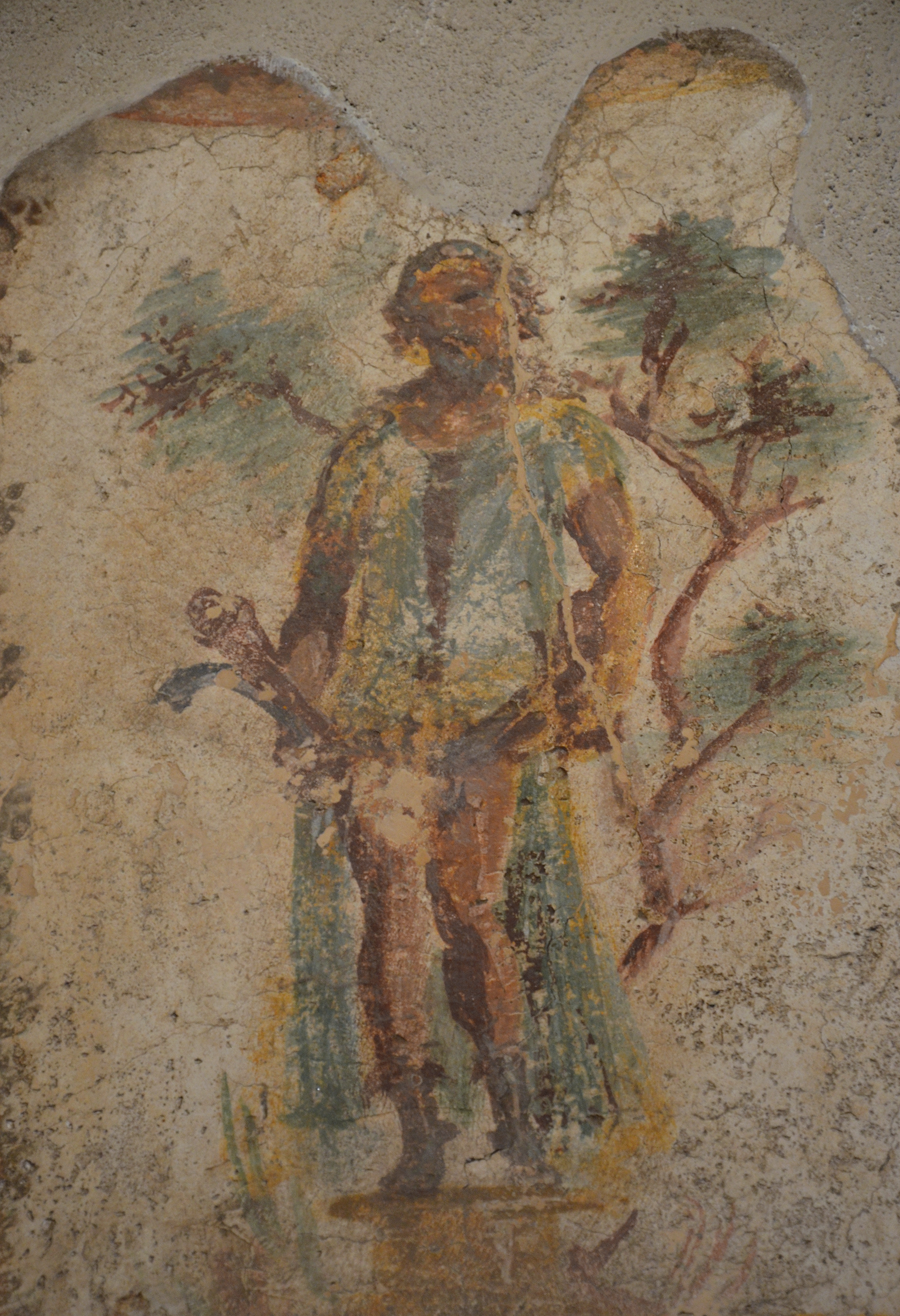
Wall painting of Priapus with two phalluses in the Lupanar 72 -79 CE

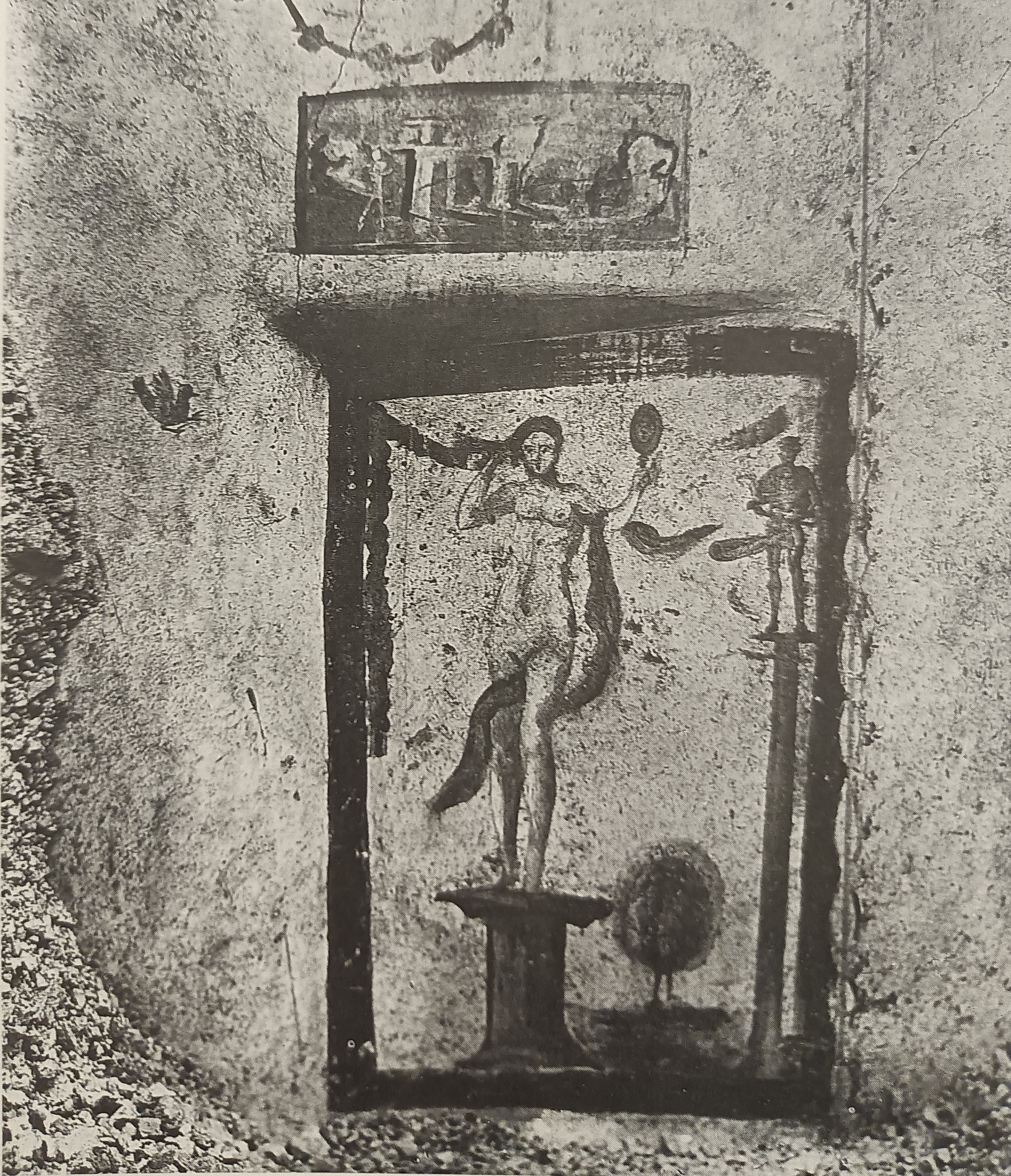
A fresco of Venus and Priapus. Above them is a landscape. House at I. 62 - 79 CE

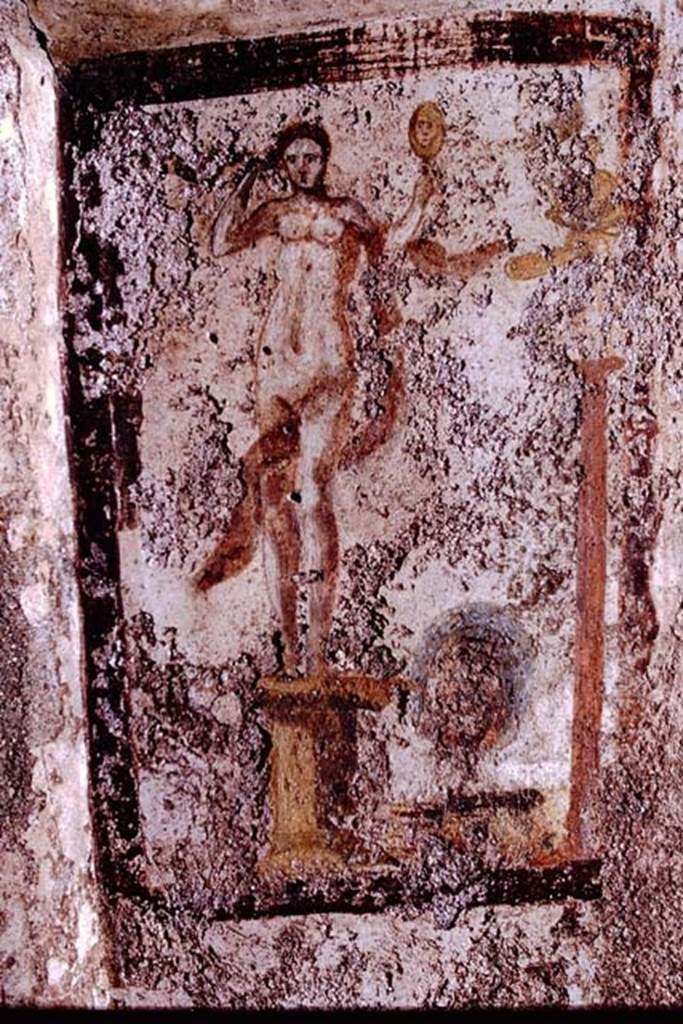
A second image of the wall painting. House at I. 62 - 79 CE

== Brothels ==
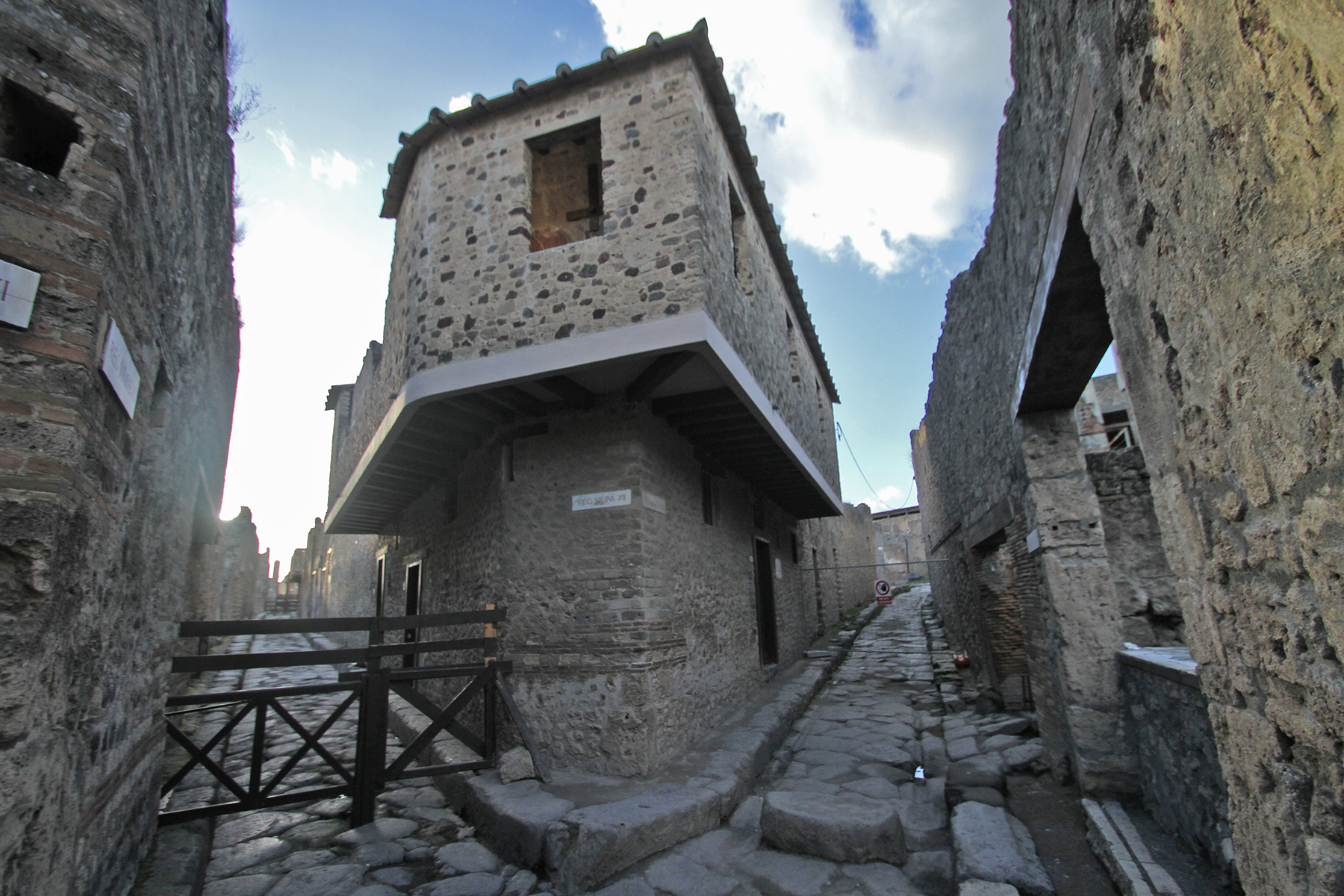
The Lupanar in Pompeii

It is unclear whether the images on the walls were advertisements for the services offered, or if they were merely intended to heighten the pleasure of the visitors. As previously mentioned, some of the paintings and frescoes became immediately famous because they represented erotic, sometimes explicit, sexual scenes.

One of the most curious buildings recovered was the Lupanar, a brothel, which had many erotic paintings and graffiti inside. The erotic paintings seem to present an idealised vision of sex, at odds with reality. The Lupanar had 10 rooms (cubicula), 5 per floor; a balcony; and a latrina. There is no proof that the rooms in the brothel were reserved for specific sexual acts to be performed within them. In 1995, Andrew Wallace-Hadrill determined that the Lupanar possessed three elements characteristic of ancient brothels: raised stone areas that could be used as beds for performing sexual favors, erotic art, and erotic graffiti.

The Lupanar is not the only brothel in Pompeii, though it is the most famous and the first officially discovered. The town seems to have been oriented to a warm consideration of sensual matters: on a wall of the Basilica (sort of a civil tribunal, thus frequented by many Roman tourists and travelers), a piece of graffiti tells the foreigner: If anyone is looking for some tender love in this town, keep in mind that here all the girls are very friendly (loose translation). Other inscriptions reveal some pricing information for various services: Athenais 2 As, Sabina 2 As (CIL IV, 4150), The house slave Logas, 8 As (CIL IV, 5203) or Maritimus licks your vulva for 4 As. He is ready to serve virgins as well. (CIL IV, 8940). These graffiti were not necessarily advertisements for sexual services but may have been insults, male prostitution to serve female clients is extremely unlikely. The amounts vary from one to two asses up to several sesterces. In the lower price range, the service was not more expensive than a loaf of bread, and may have been more of a conventional insult than a true representation of the price charged for the service.

Wall paintings from the Lupanar

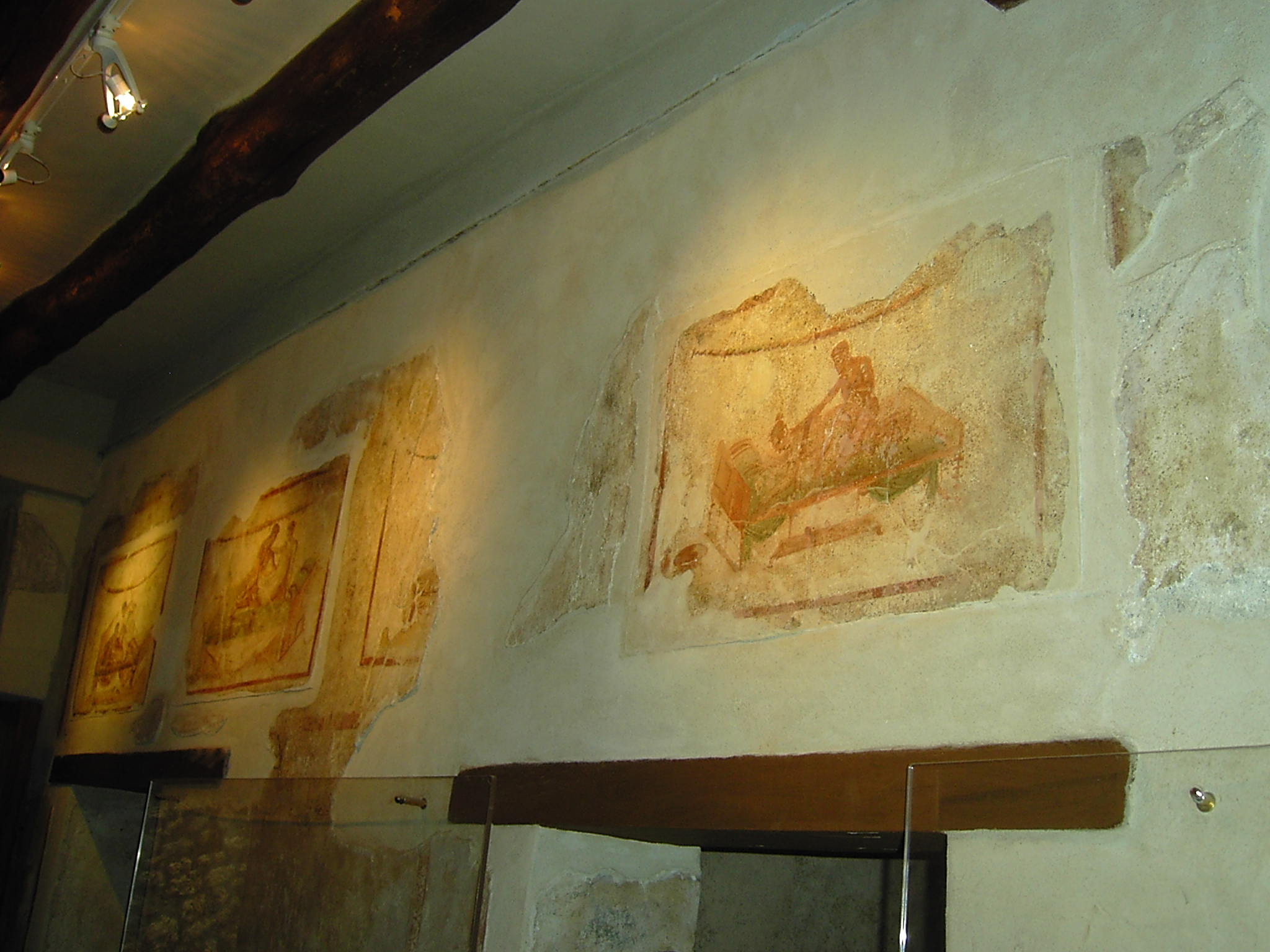
Erotic frescos on the walls of the Lupanar brothel

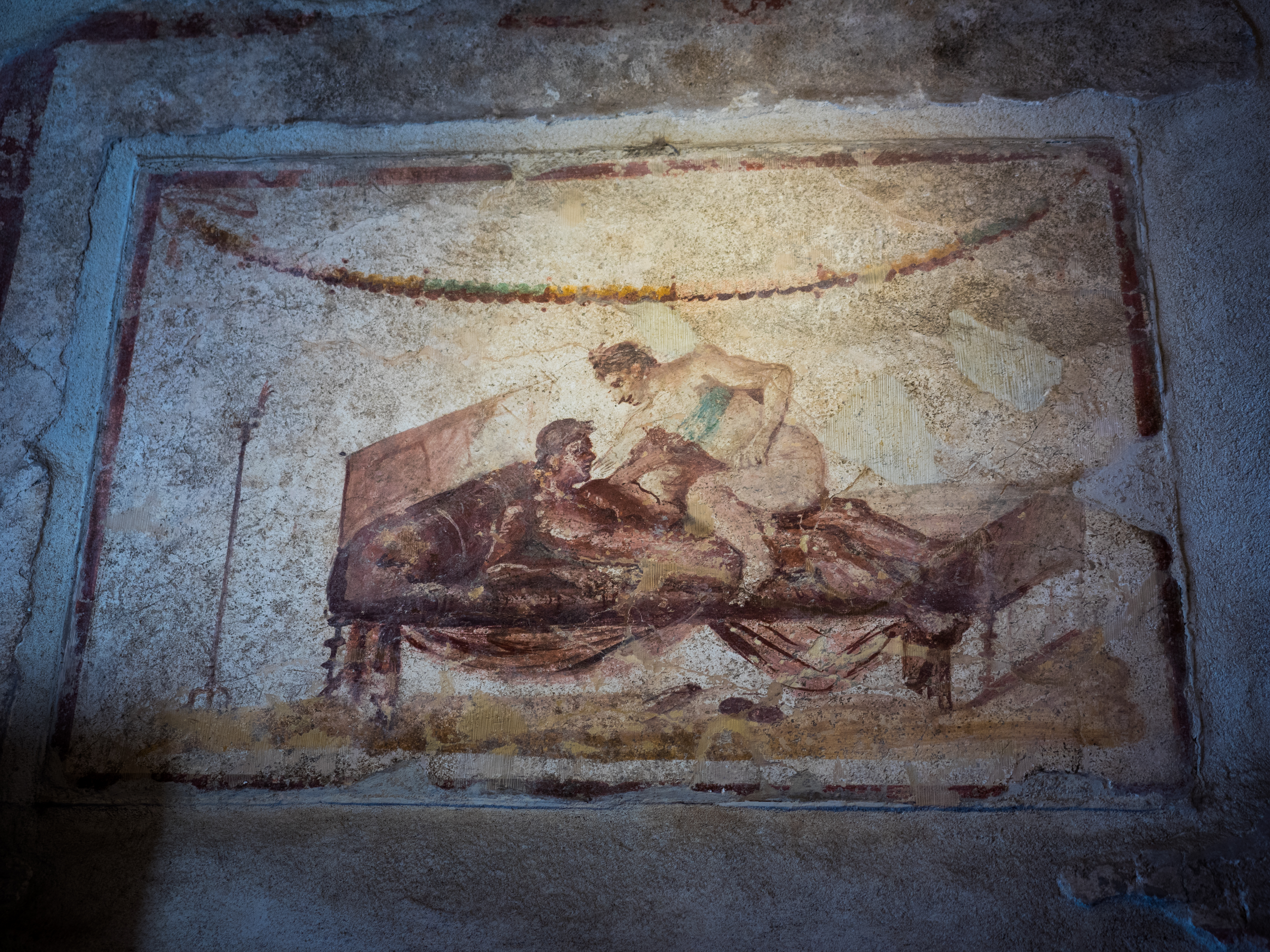
Erotic Fresco from the Lupanar brothel. 72 - 79 CE

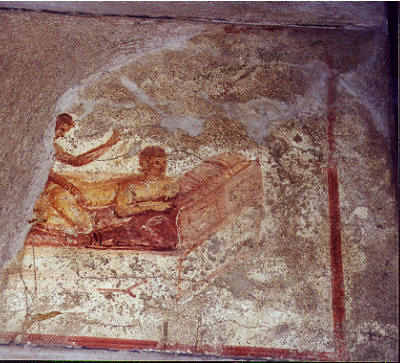
Fresco from the Lupanar brothel, the largest Pompeii brothel. 72 - 79 CE

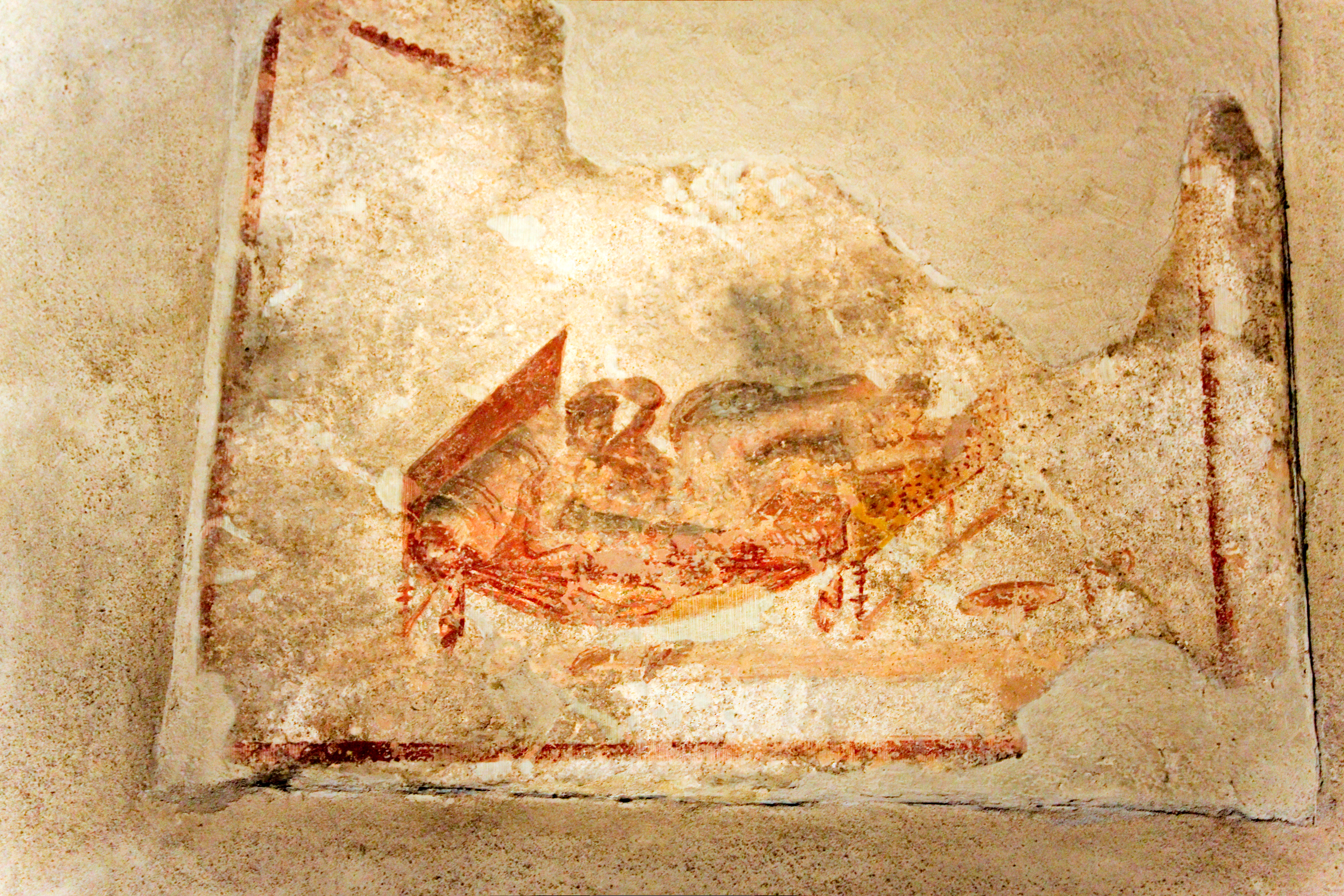
Erotic Fresco from the Lupanar, Pompeii. 72 - 79 CE

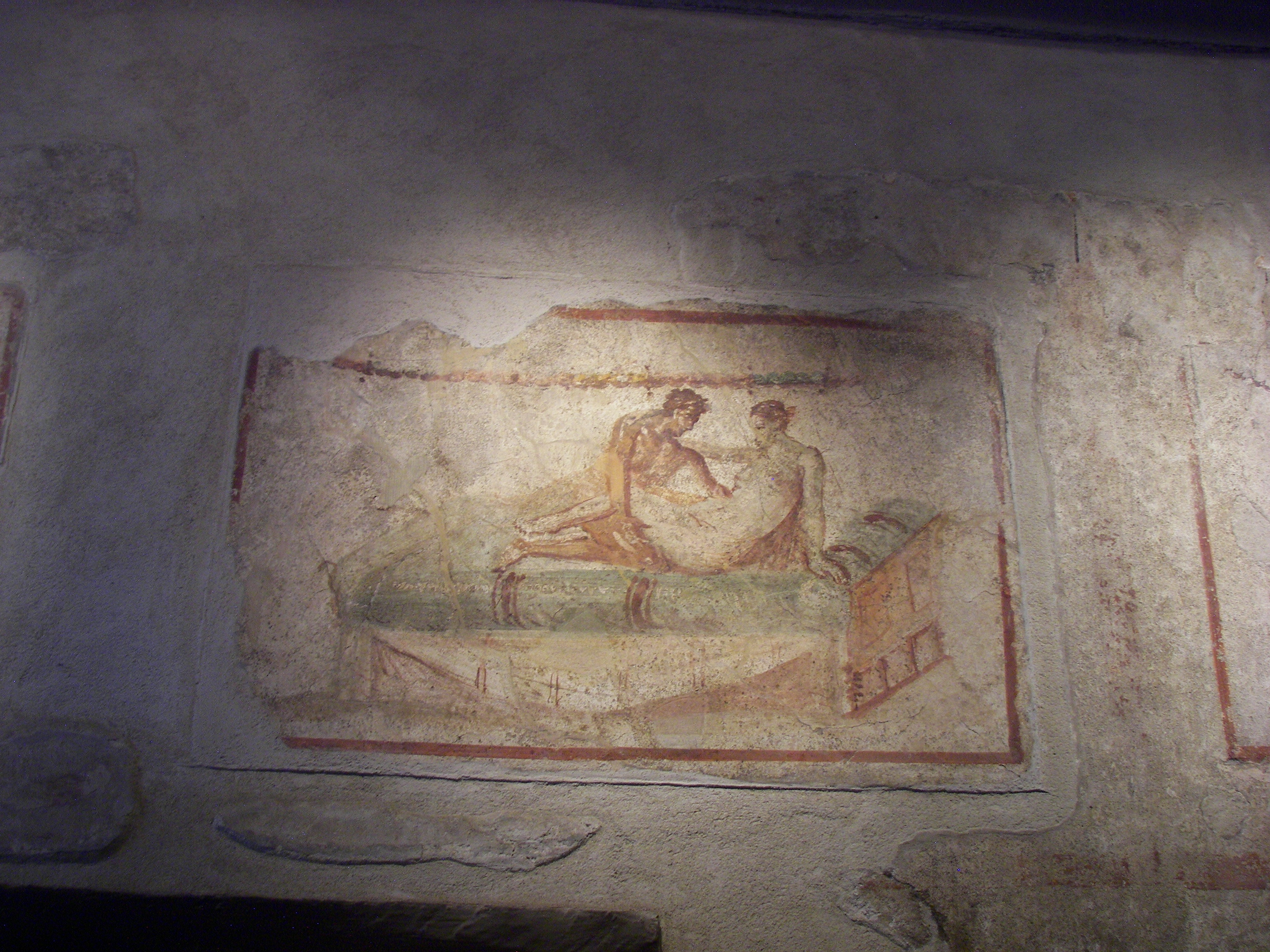
Erotic Fresco from the Lupanar, Pompeii. 72 - 79 CE

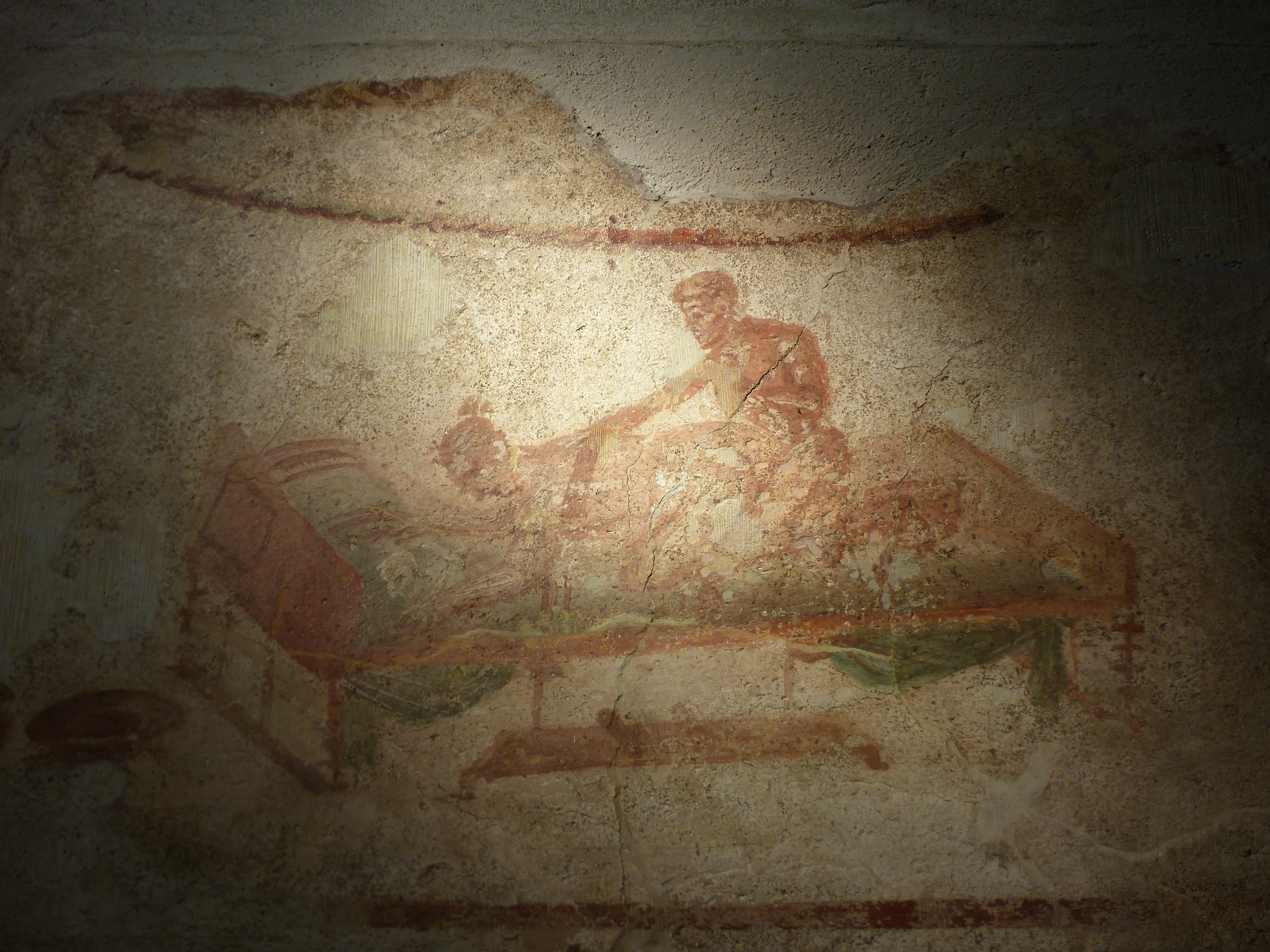
Erotic Fresco Lupanar, Pompeii. 72 - 79 CE

== Suburban baths ==
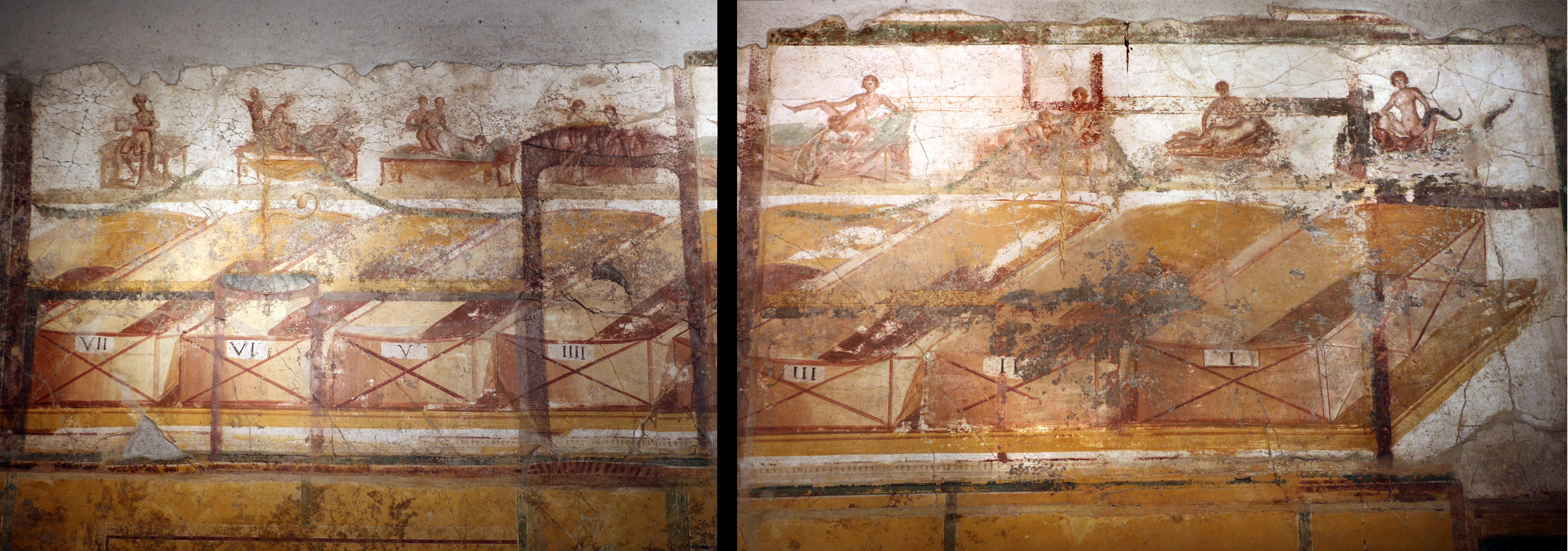
A wall in the dressing room in the suburban baths. On this wall there are seven paintings of sexual scenes located above paintings of numbered boxes.An eighth painting is of a nude male. 62 to 79 CE

The Suburban Baths are located near the Marine Gate in Pompeii. In one room, thought to be a dressing room, there are seven wall paintings of sexual scenes and one of a figure with an enlarged scrotum.

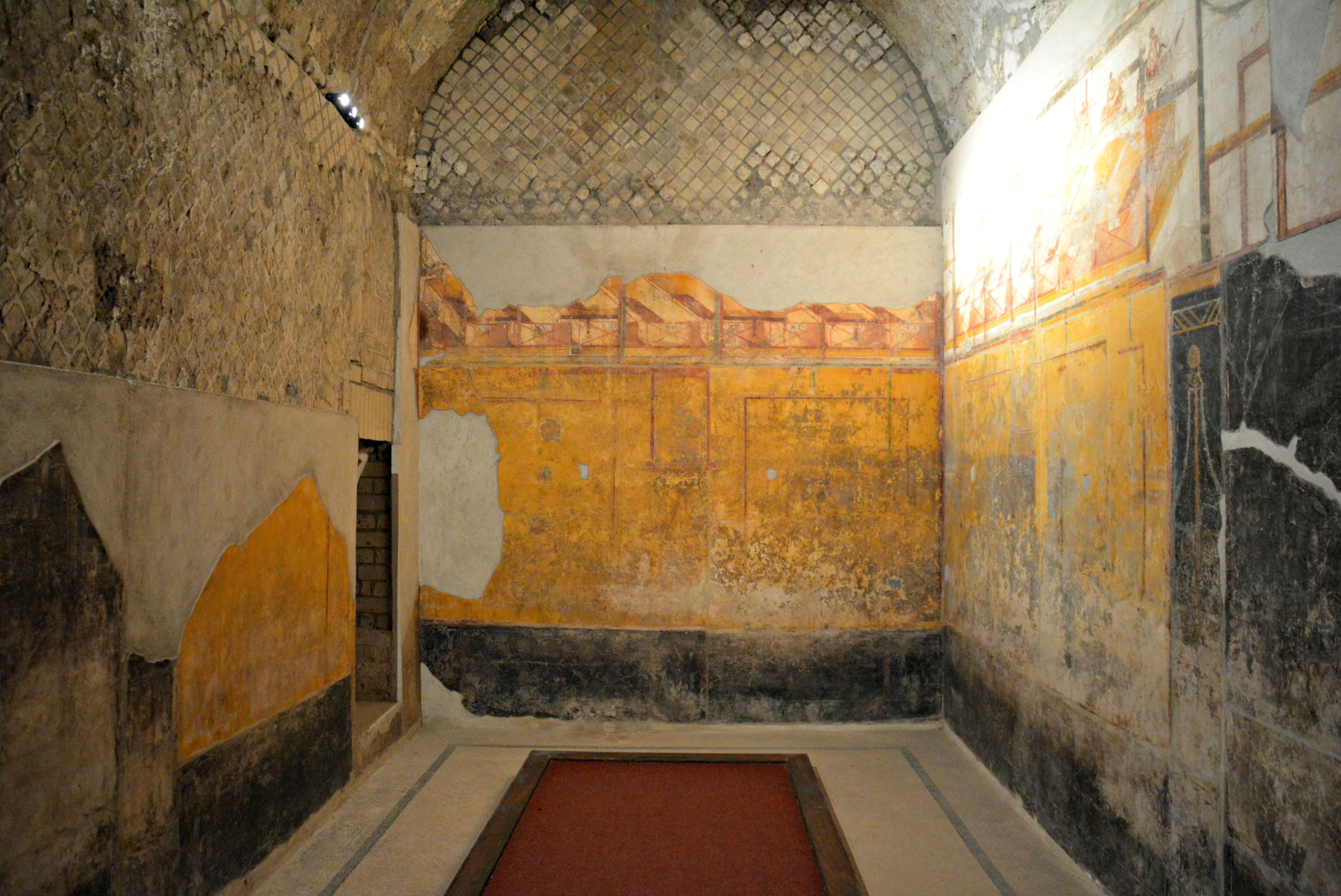
The dressing room in the suburban baths. It is thought that a wooden shelf may have extended along two of these walls and that on this shelf were placed boxes where bathers could place their clothes.

These eight paintings are located above paintings of numbered boxes sitting on a shelf. These wall paintings were found in 1986 when the room was first excavated. The paintings are dated to 62 to 79 CE. The building that the baths are in is two stories with the baths taking up the ground floor.

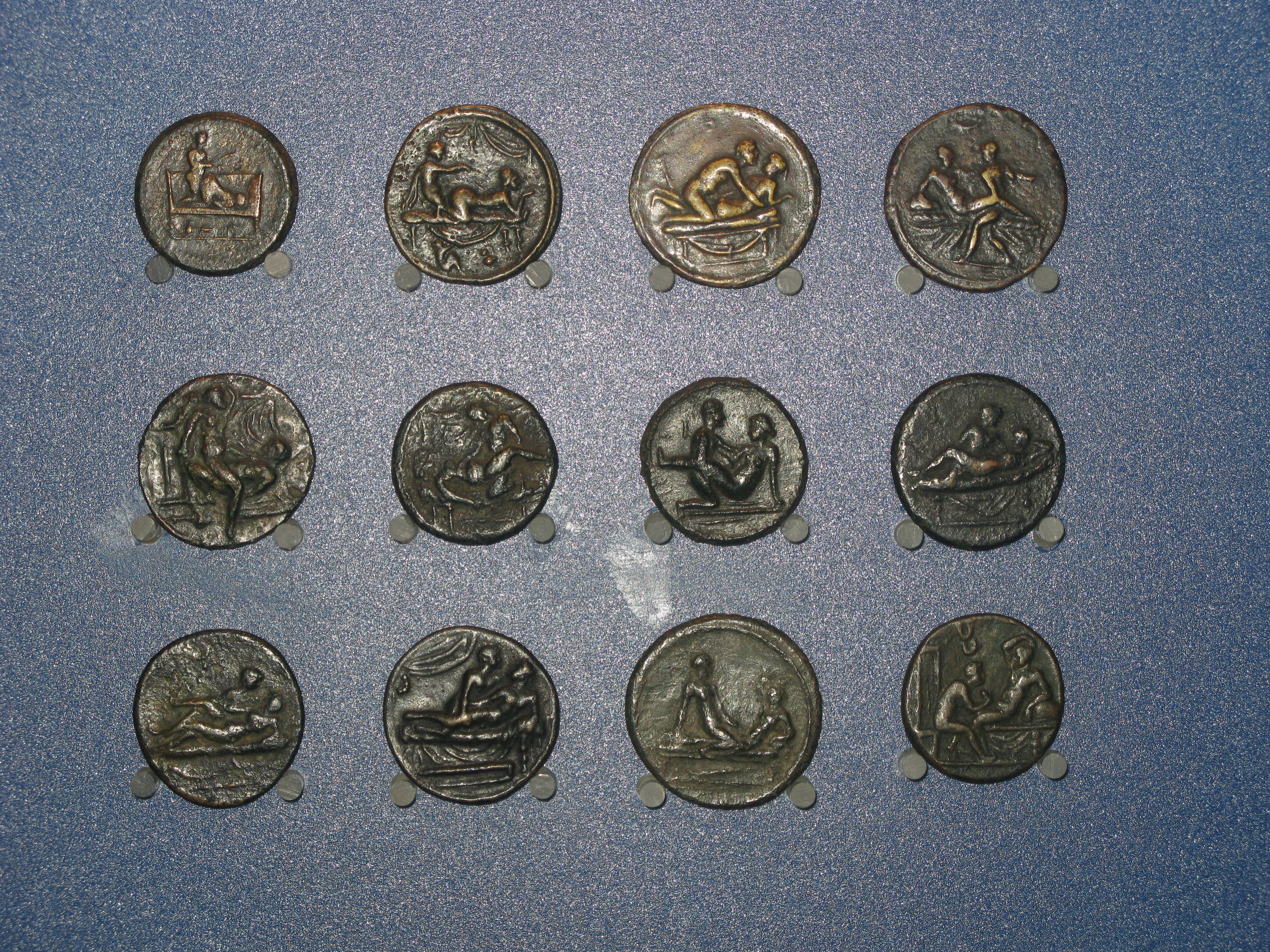
Ancient Roman Spintria Tokens that are speculated to have been used as locker tokens in the dressing room of the suburban baths. On one side of the tokens is an image of a sexual scene and on the other side is a numeral. Found in Rome. Dates of production are around 22 to 79 CE. Hunterian Museum and Art Gallery, Glasgow.

The function of the wall paintings is not yet clear: some authors say that they indicate that the services of prostitutes were available on the upper floor of the bathhouse and could be a sort of advertising, while others prefer the hypothesis that their only purpose was to decorate the walls with joyful scenes, as these were in Roman culture.

Another idea is that both the paintings of sexual scenes and the paintings of boxes with numerals on them were related to the use of spintria tokens that gave people access to a locker in the dressing room.

Each wall painting of a sexual scene has a painting just below it of a box with a number on it. It is thought that there were actual boxes that were placed under these paintings. These boxes would have been placed on a wooden shelf. This wooden shelf would have run along two walls of this dressing room just underneath where the paintings of numbered boxes are. There are some holes in the rear and right wall where brackets that held the shelves could have been. It is thought that these boxes that were sitting on this wooden shelf under these paintings would have been where people attending the baths would have put their clothes after they had undressed in this room. The only remains of the boxes themselves are metal straps. In the wall paintings of the boxes an "X" shape at the front of the boxes indicates where the straps were. The wall painting also shows the wooden shelf underneath the boxes.

Spintria tokens have a numeral on one side and an image of a sexual scene on the other. It is speculated that the sexual scenes and numerals on the tokens related to the wall paintings of sexual scenes and numerals in the dressing room. When the token was given to a person it then gave them access to a place to put their clothing. Possibly they may have put their clothing inside the box that was sitting on the wooden shelf in the dressing room.

It has been commented that "Graffiti from Pompeii, Herculaneum and 2nd century Ostia Antica, often refer to group sex, although none describe the pose of scene VI [from the suburban baths]."

Wall paintings from the dressing room in the suburban baths

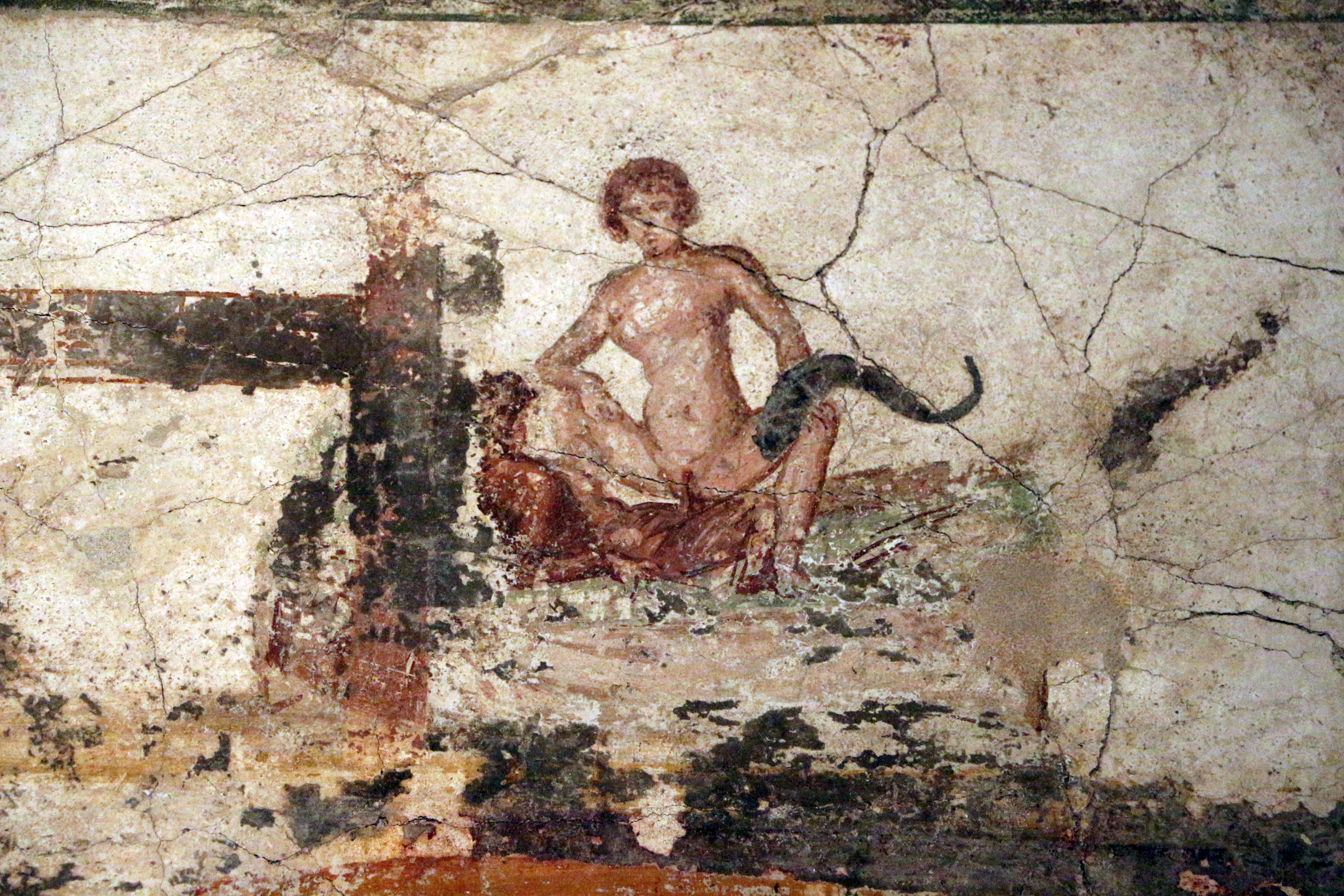
Fresco showing a cowgirl position. A ferret is on the knee of one of the figures. Suburban baths, Pompeii. 62 to 79 CE

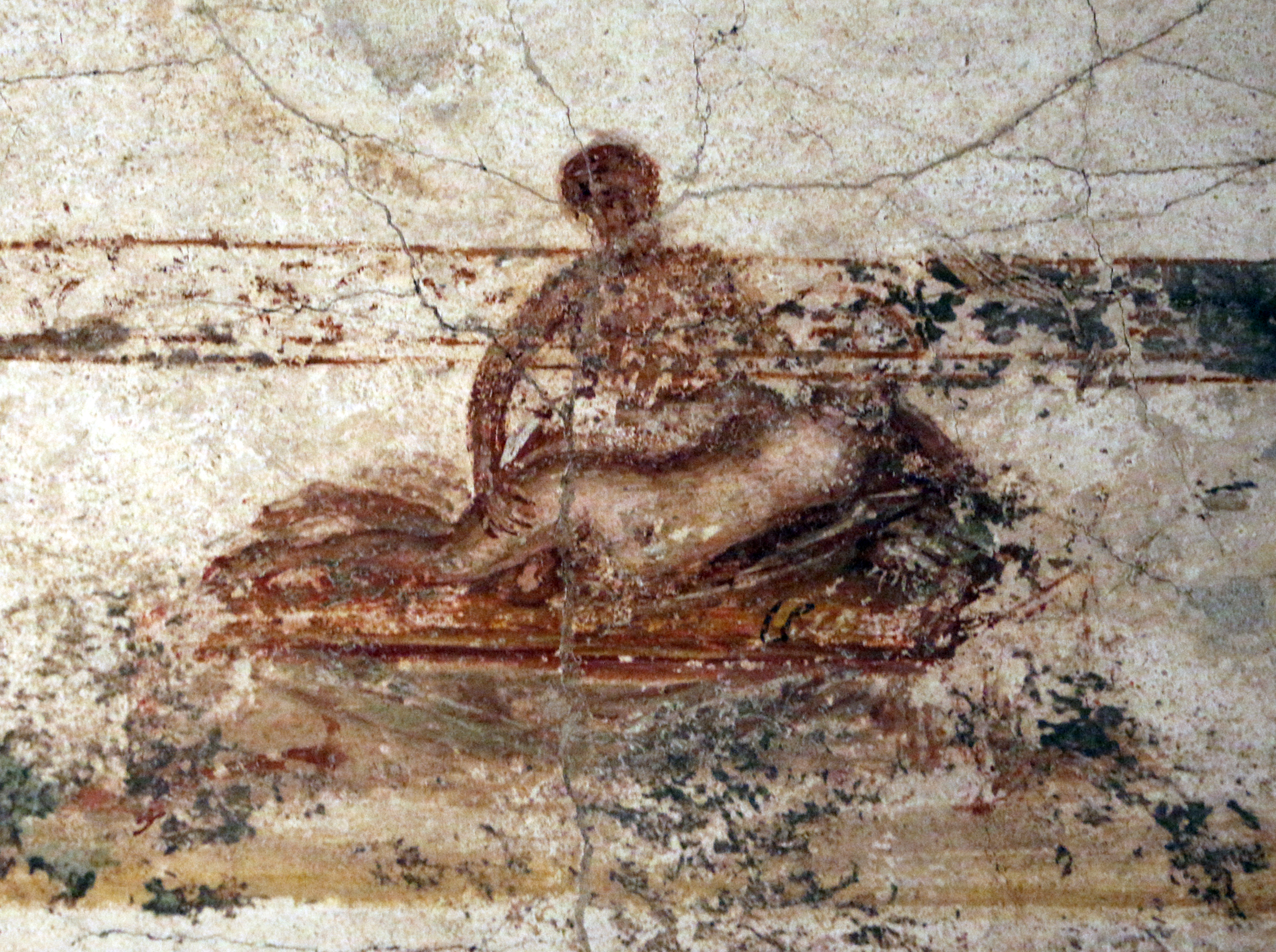
An erotic scene on a bed. Wall painting. Suburban baths, Pompeii. 62 to 79 CE

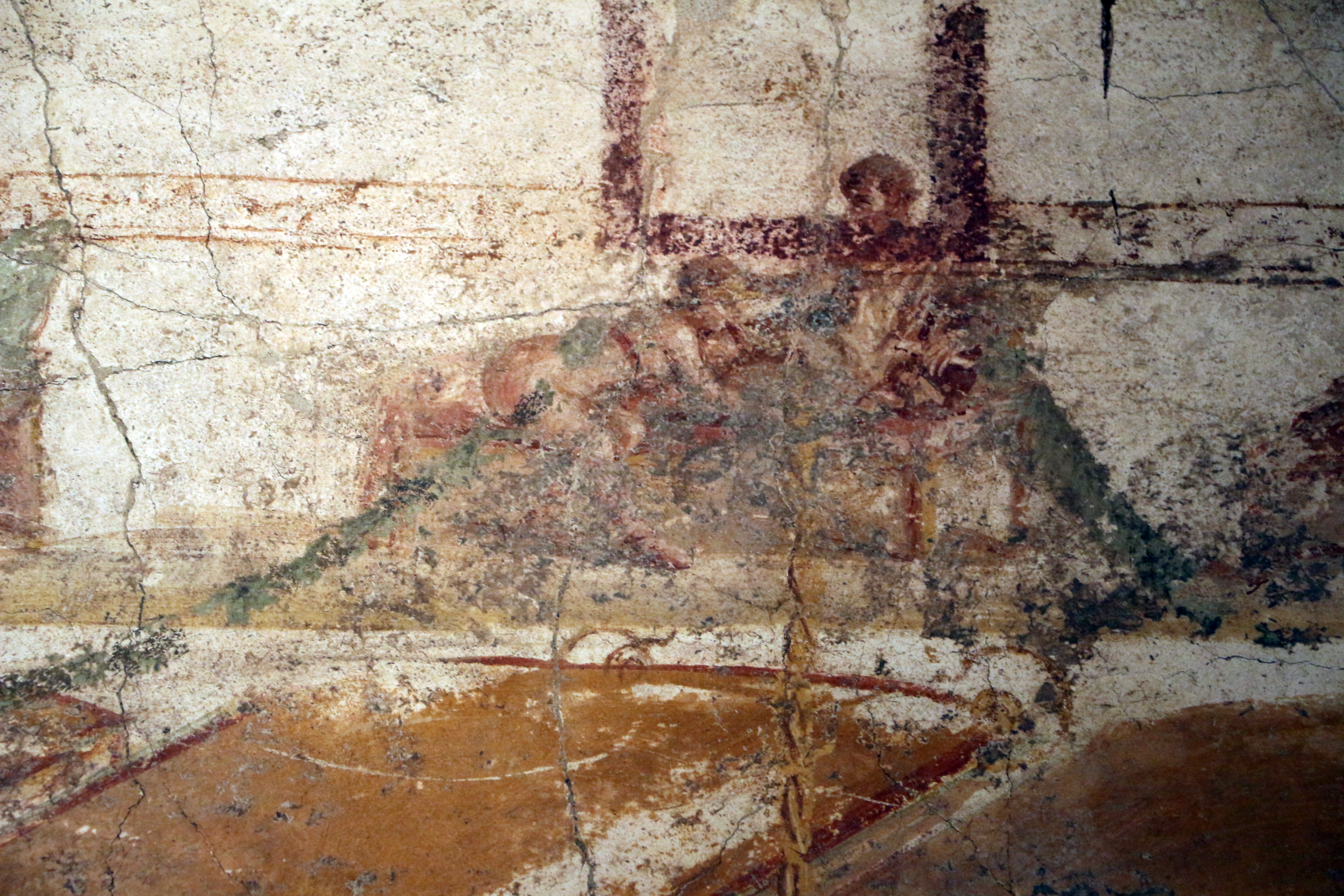
Fellatio. Wall painting. Suburban baths, Pompeii. 62 to 79 CE

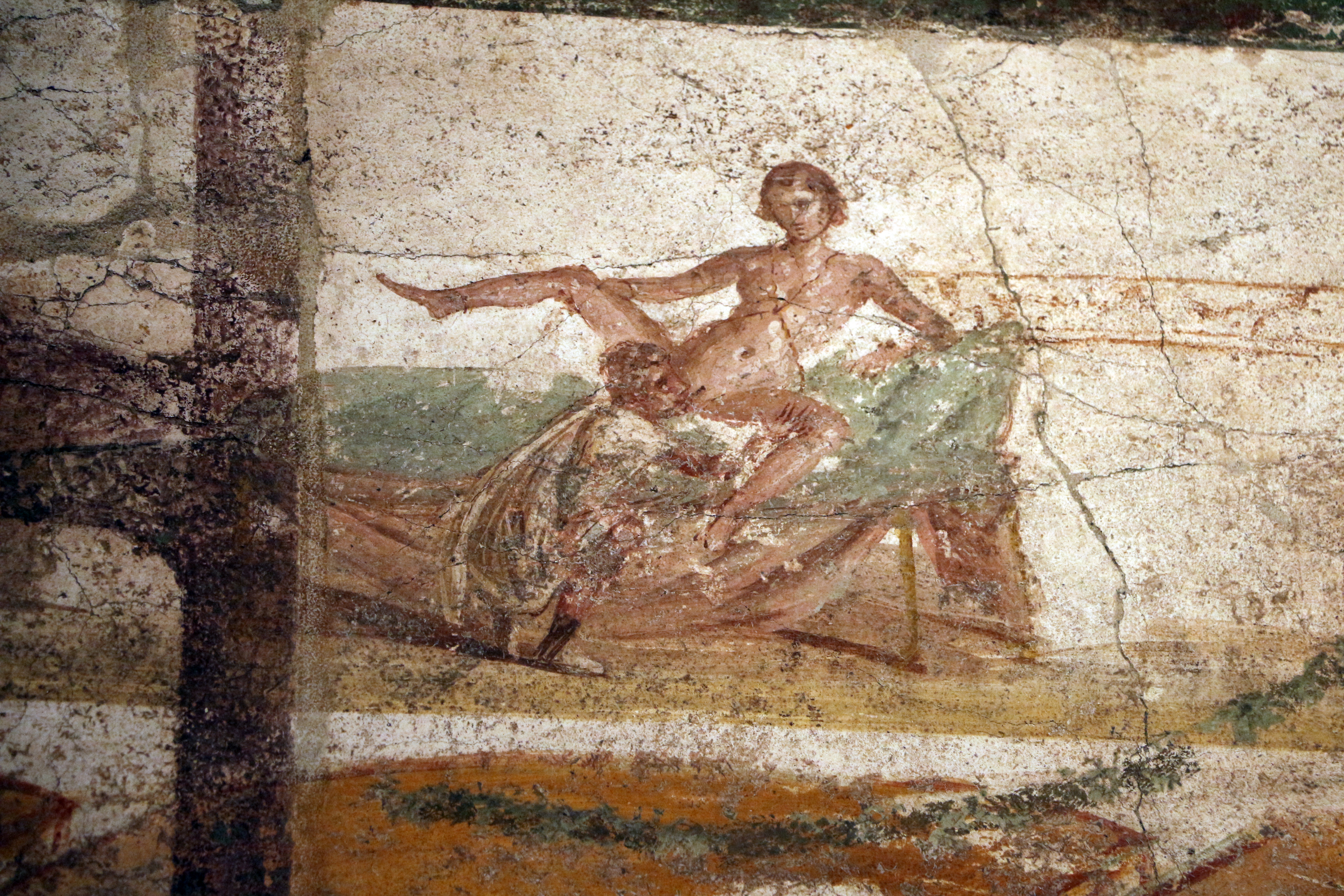
Fresco depicting cunnilingus. Suburban baths, Pompeii. 62 to 79 CE

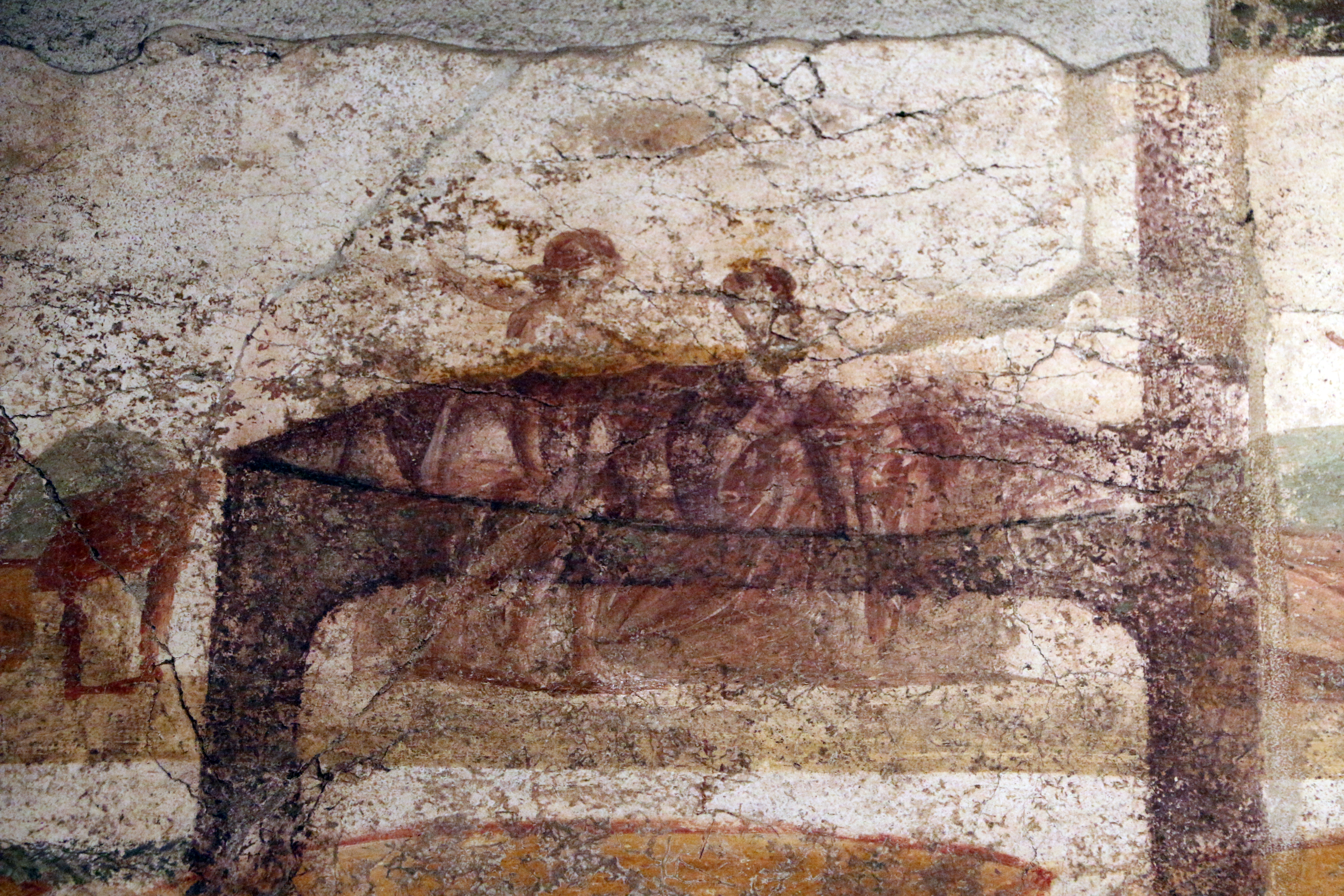
Lesbian sex scene. The patches of dark green color are remains of the repainting of the wall. Suburban baths, Pompeii. 62 to 79 CE

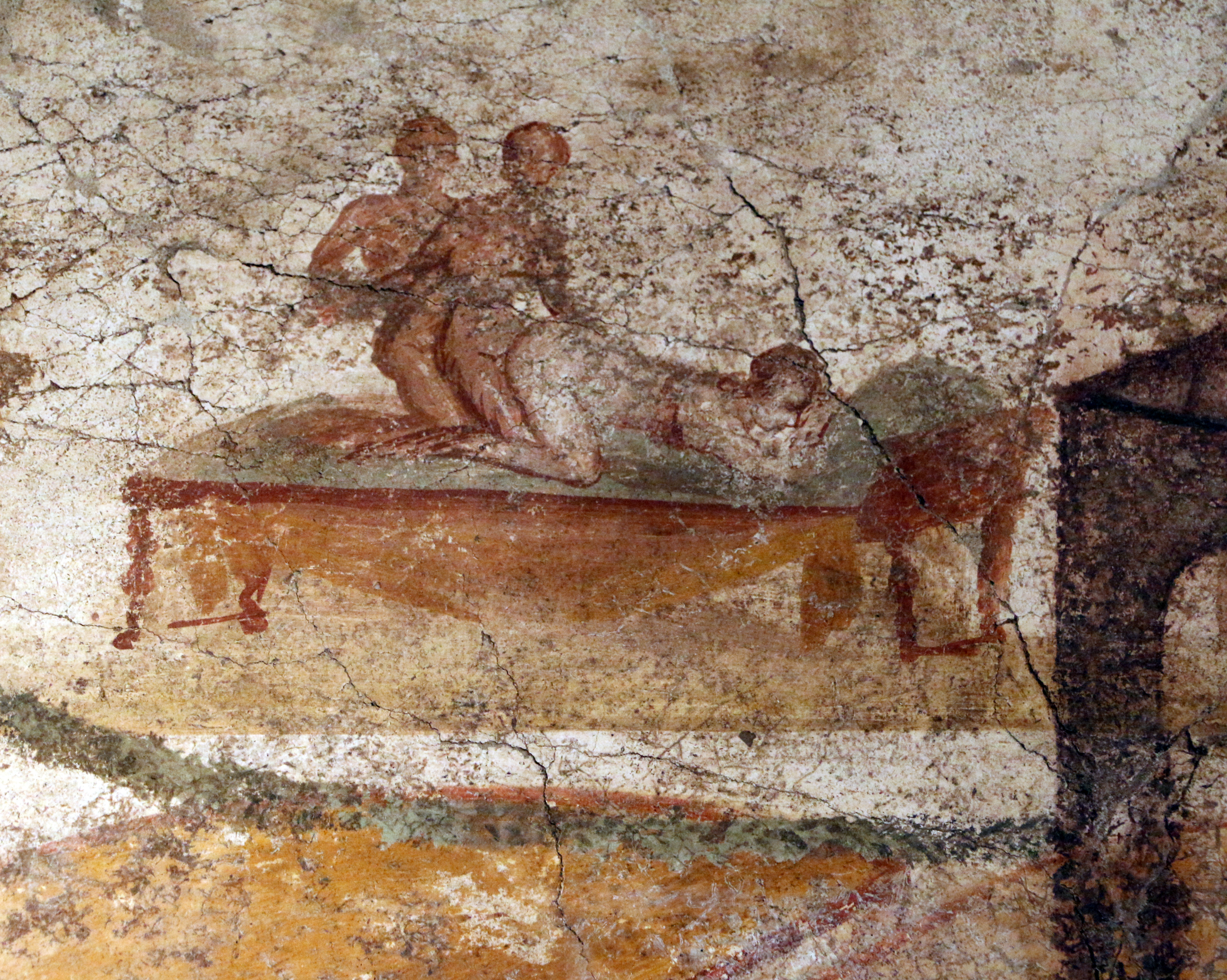
Sex between a female and two males. Wall painting. Suburban baths, Pompeii. 62 to 79 CE

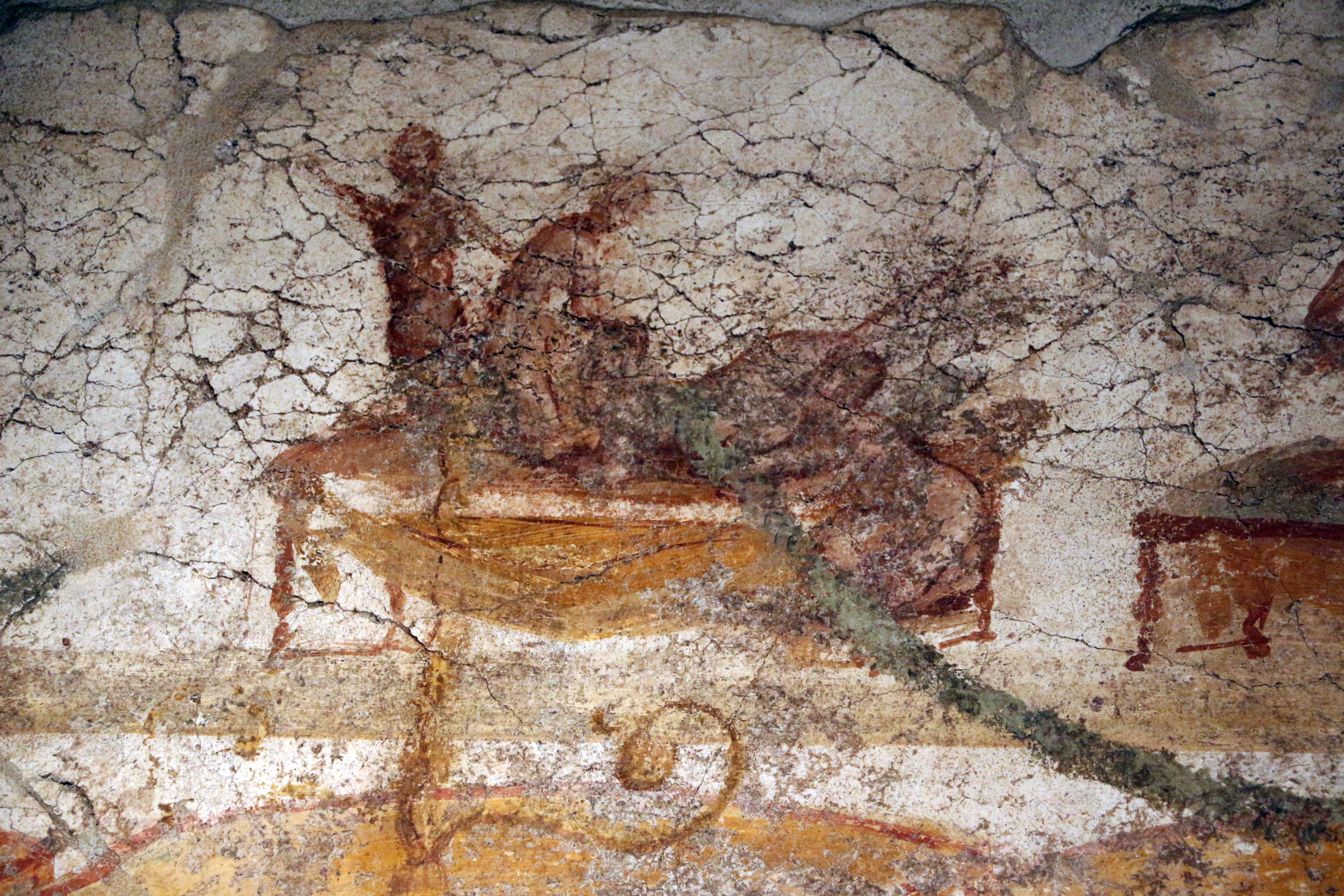
Cunnilingus, fellatio and anal sex between two females and two males. Wall painting, Suburban baths. Pompeii. 62 to 79 CE

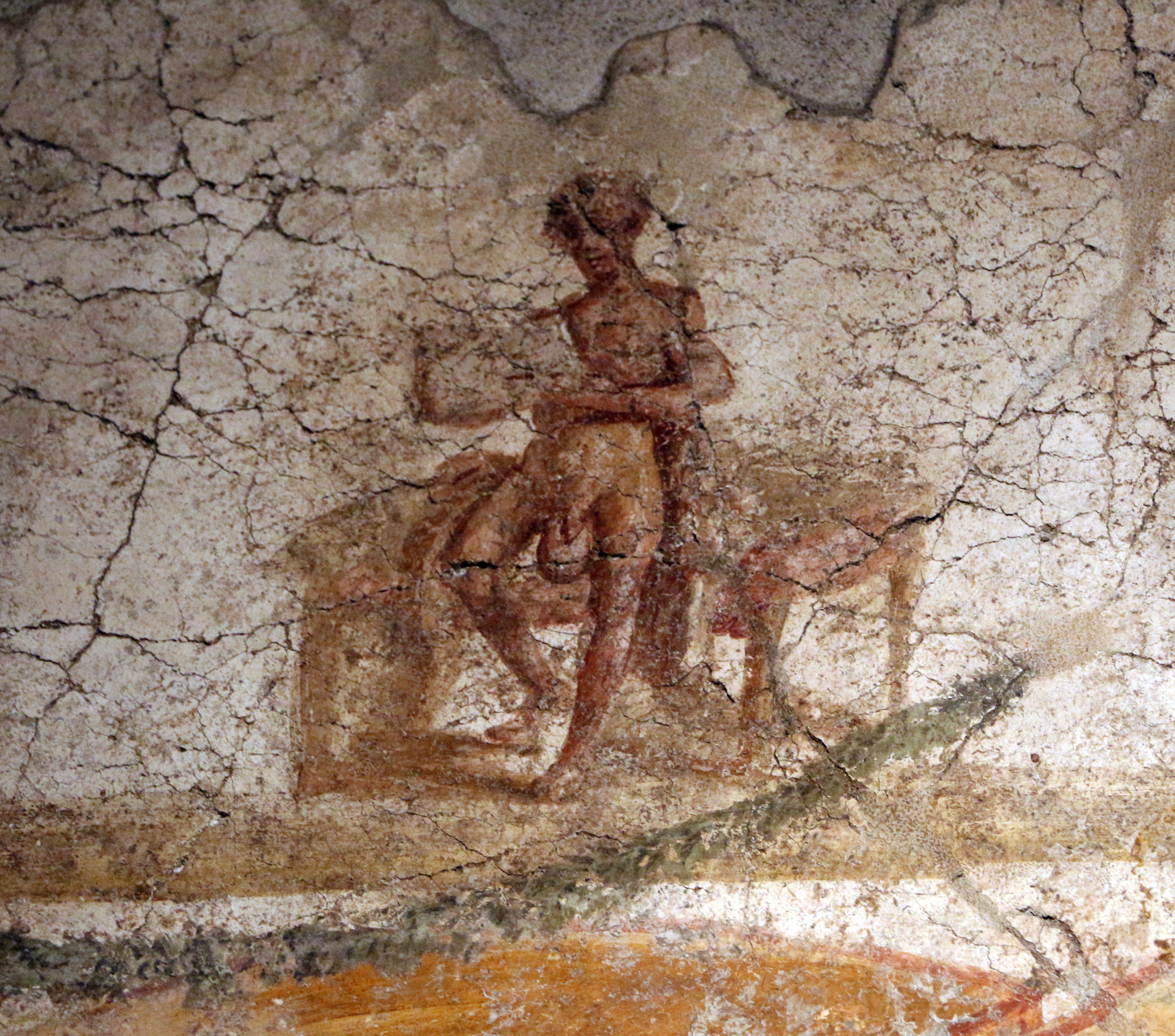
A nude male with an enlarged scrotum holding a scroll. Wall painting. Suburban baths, Pompeii. 62 to 79 CE

== Venus ==
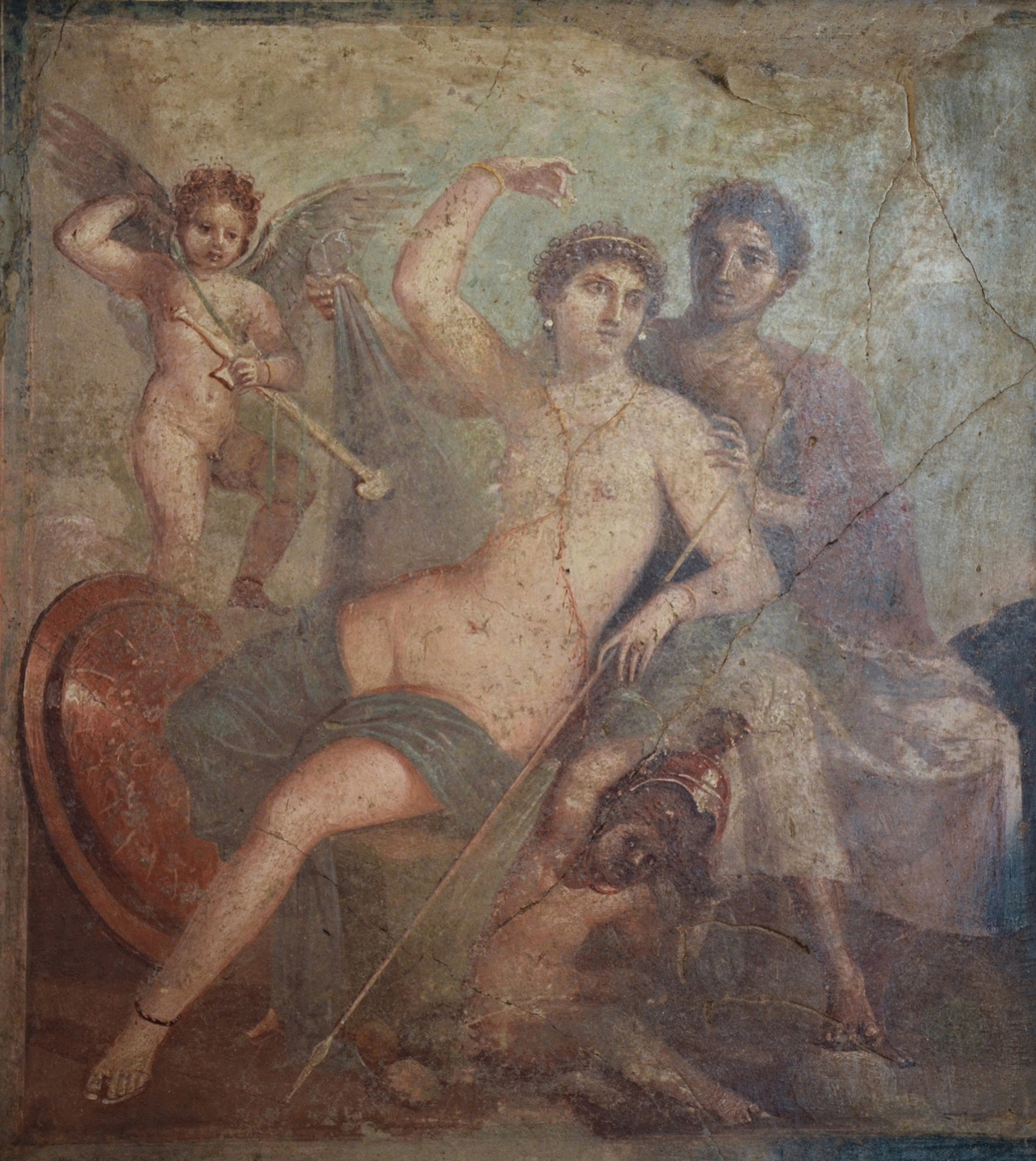
Fresco Depicting Mars and Venus, from the House of Mars and Venus in Pompeii

Venus was the divine protector of Pompeii, and featured in many frescoes around the city. The goddess of love, sex, and fertility, Venus was closely associated with eroticism and prostitution in ancient Rome. The mural of Venus from Pompeii may have been a Roman copy of the then famous painting by Apelles which Lucian mentioned.

The fresco of Mars and Venus, located in the tablinum of the House of Mars and Venus, is believed to model the proper family roles of husband and wife for those entering the home. Mars and Venus, a popular couple from mythology, were represented in many houses' tablinum for this reason. Venus has appeared in Pompeian artwork at least 197 times, the majority of these depictions located in a home's reception area where a guest would not need an invitation to enter, although she also appears on tavern signs and political banners. Previous scholarship assumed Venus would be more common in cubicula, small inclosed rooms that may function as a bedroom, due to her association with love and sex. Recent studies have shown this is not the case and that Venus is more commonly portrayed in large common rooms. Approximately one third of artwork featuring Venus represents some sort of love scene. There are two Venus types found almost exclusively in Pompeii, Venus Pompeiana ("Venus of Pompeii") and Venus Pescatrice ("Venus the Fisher-woman"). Venus Pompeiana is depicted standing rigidly, usually trapped with a mantle and holding her right arm across her chest. She is most commonly depicted in places that would be seen by many people, possible to demonstrate a house's patron goddess or for protection as this form of Venus has special religious and ritual significance to Pompeii. Venus Pescatrice is typically shown sitting down, holding a fishing rod and is always semi-naked. The depictions of Venus Pescatrice are all similar in structure, suggesting they derive from the same source, though this source has not been found.

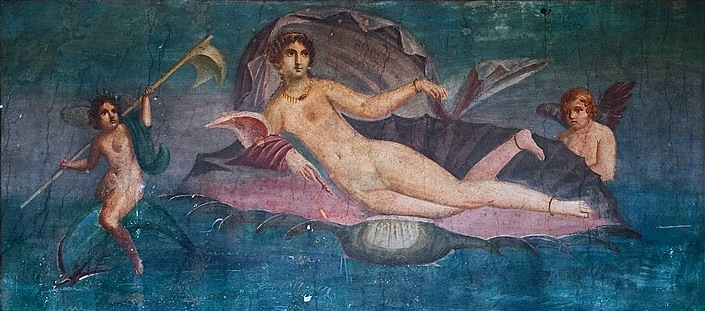
Mural of Venus

== Gallery ==
Mythology

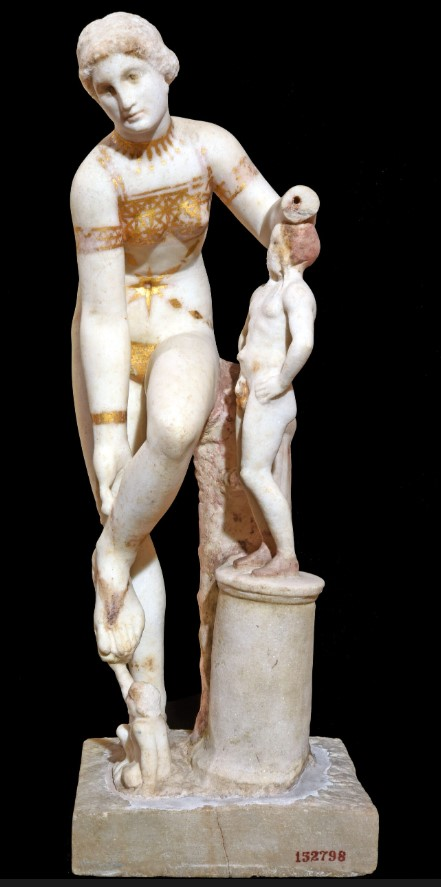
A statuette of Aphrodite with eros. Some of the body decoration is gilt. From Pompeii. National Archaeological Museum, Naples.

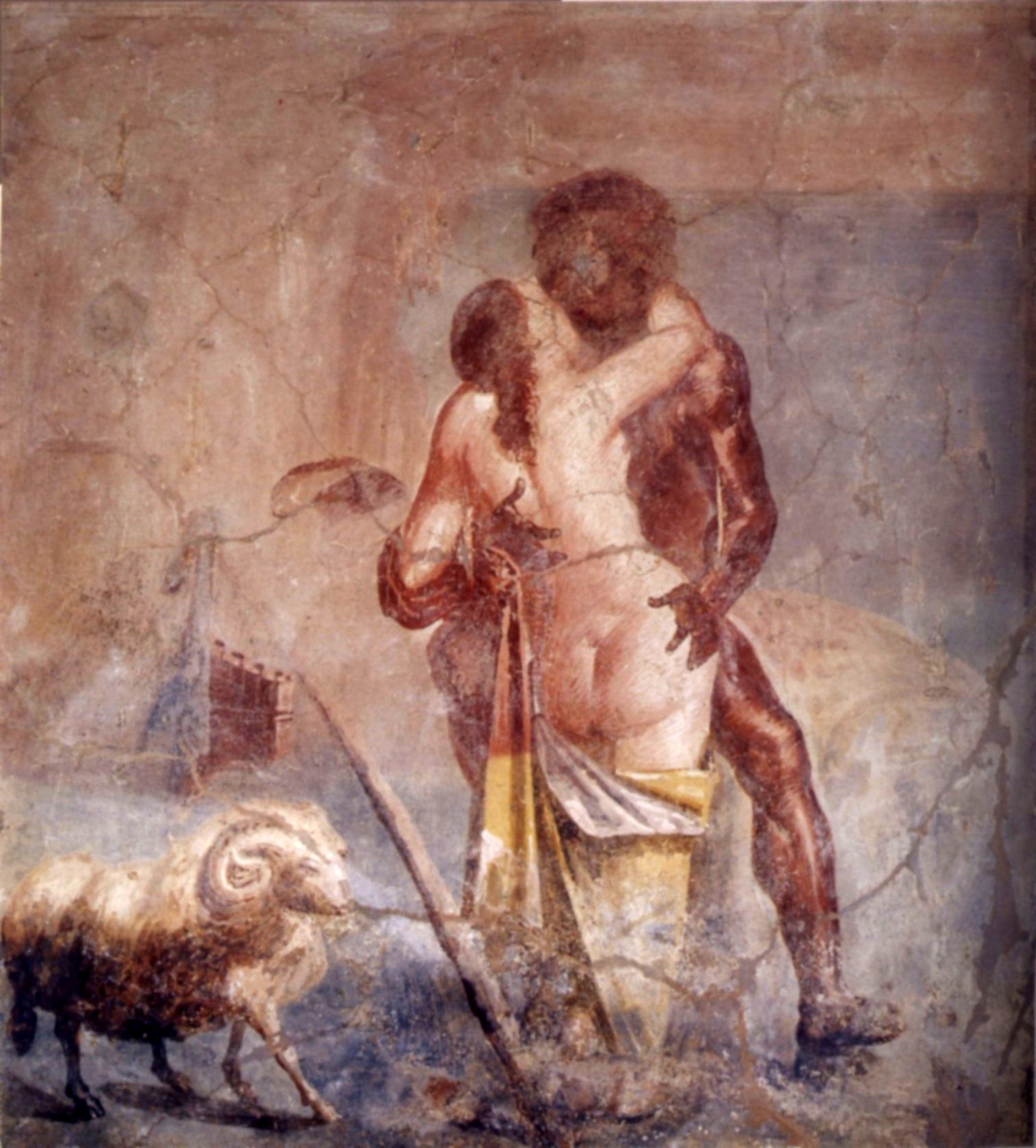
Polyphemus and Galatea kissing. Fresco from a Pompeii sleeping room. Naples National Archaeological Museum. around 50 CE – 79 CE

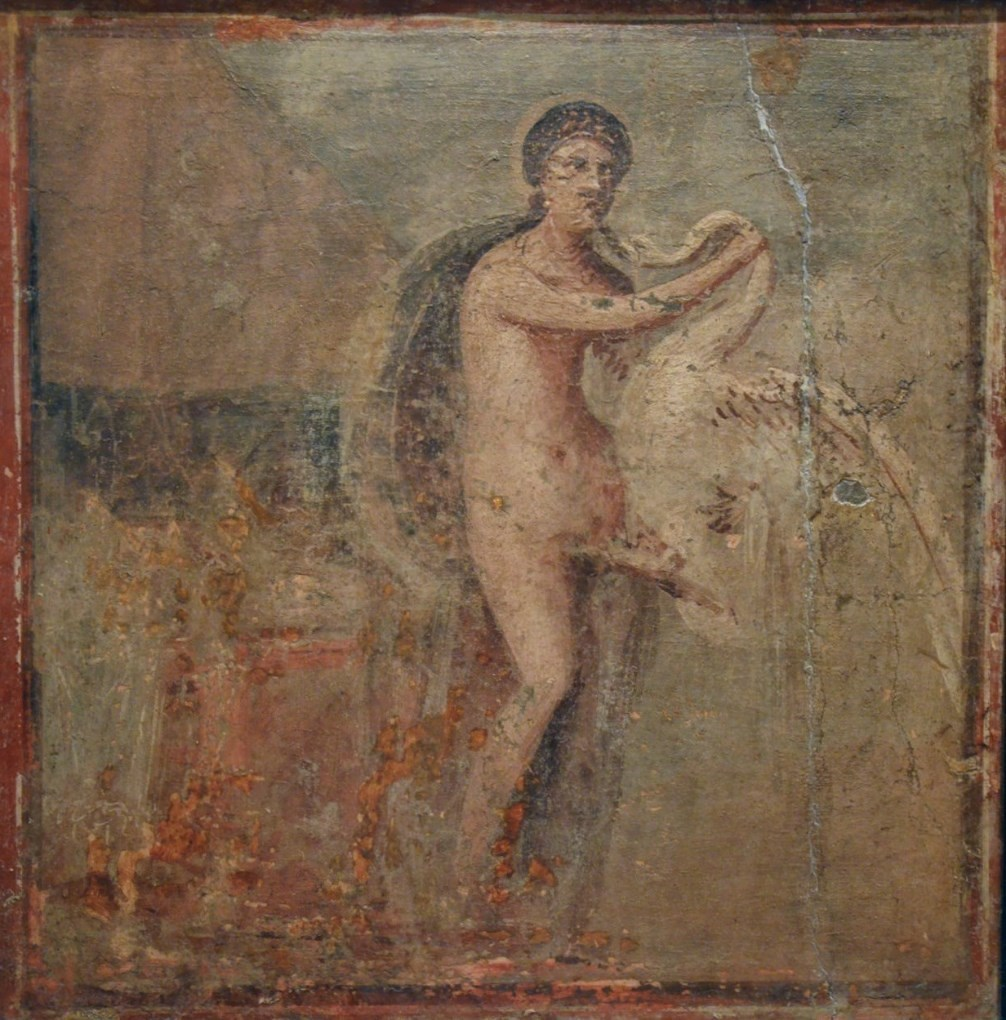
Fresco showing Leda and the swan, from Pompeii, National Archaeological Museum, Naples 50–79 CE

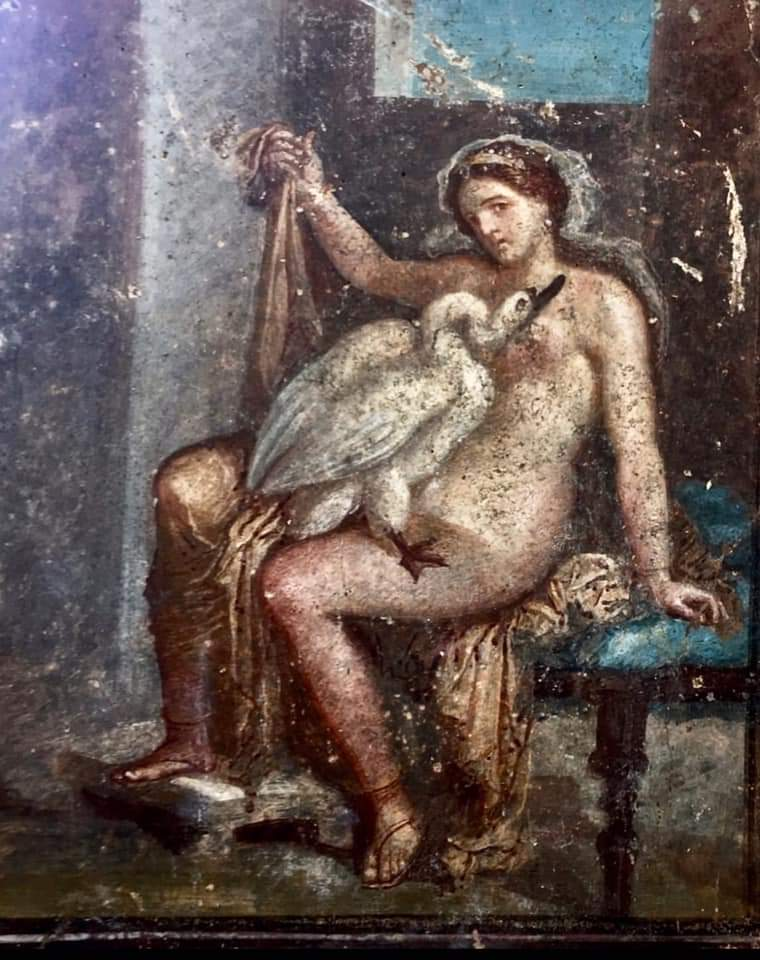
Fresco showing Leda and the swan. From Pompeii.

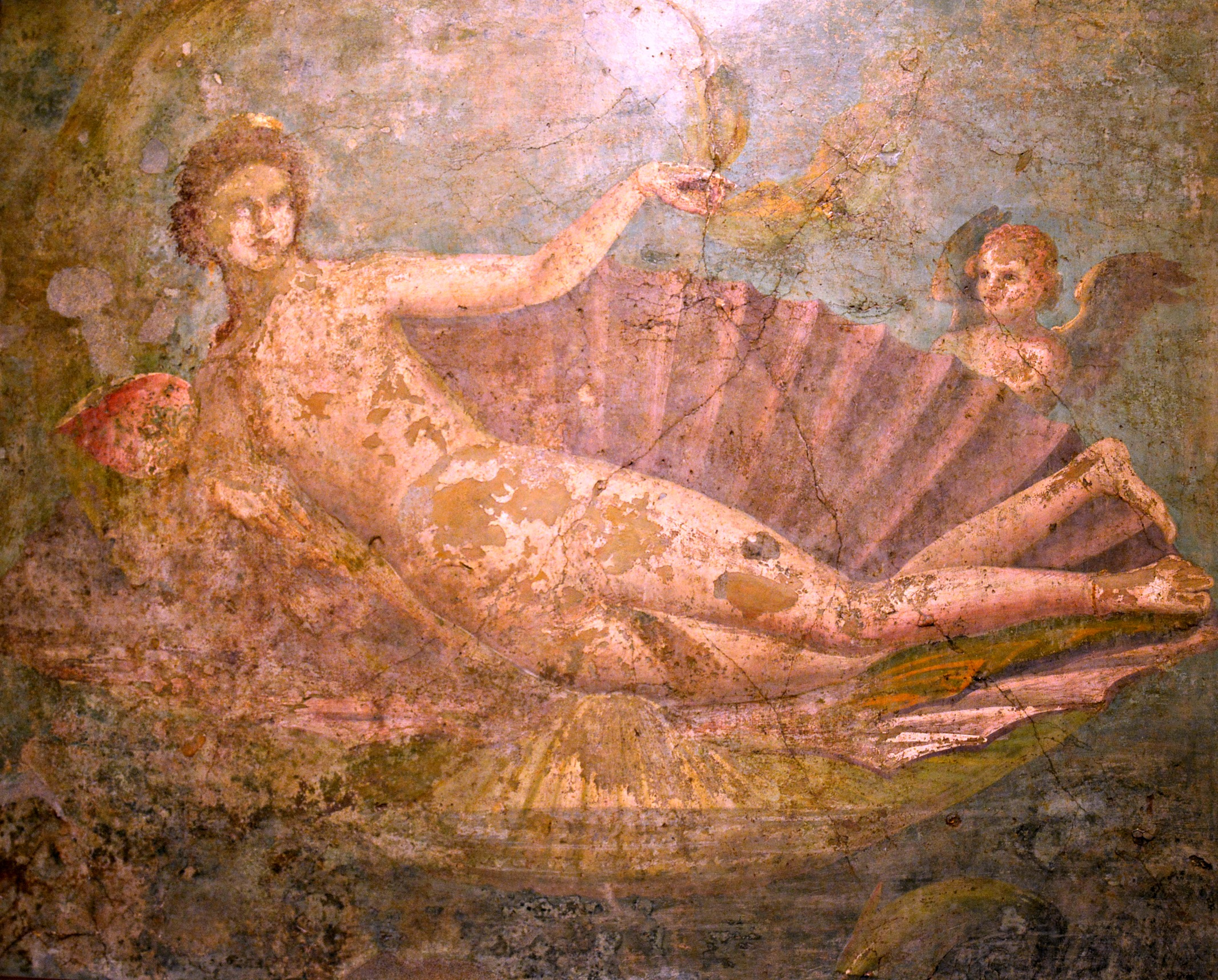
Venus and Eros. Wall painting from Pompeii.
Nymph, Maenad and Satyr

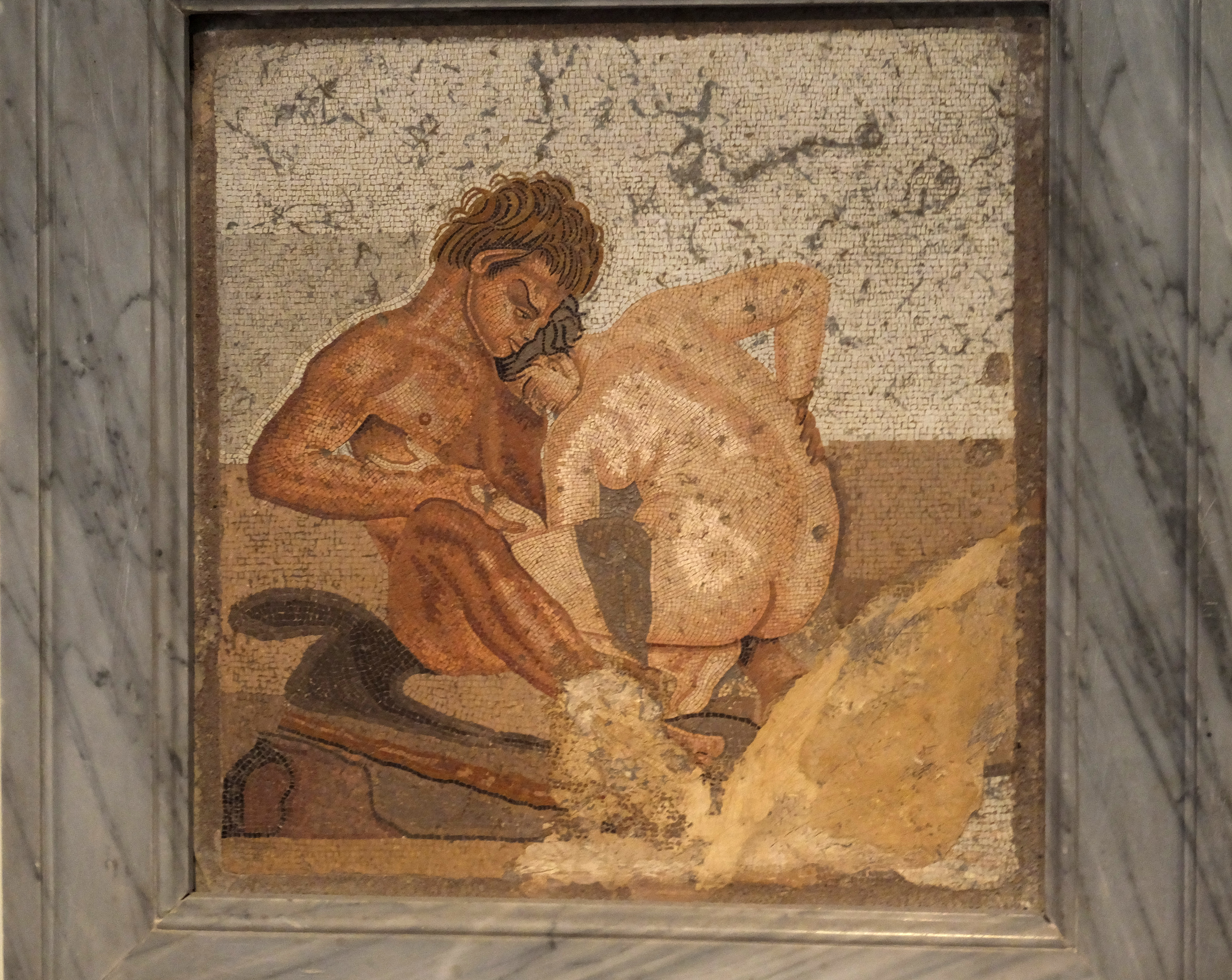
Tile mosaic, Nymph and a Satyr, House of the Faun.

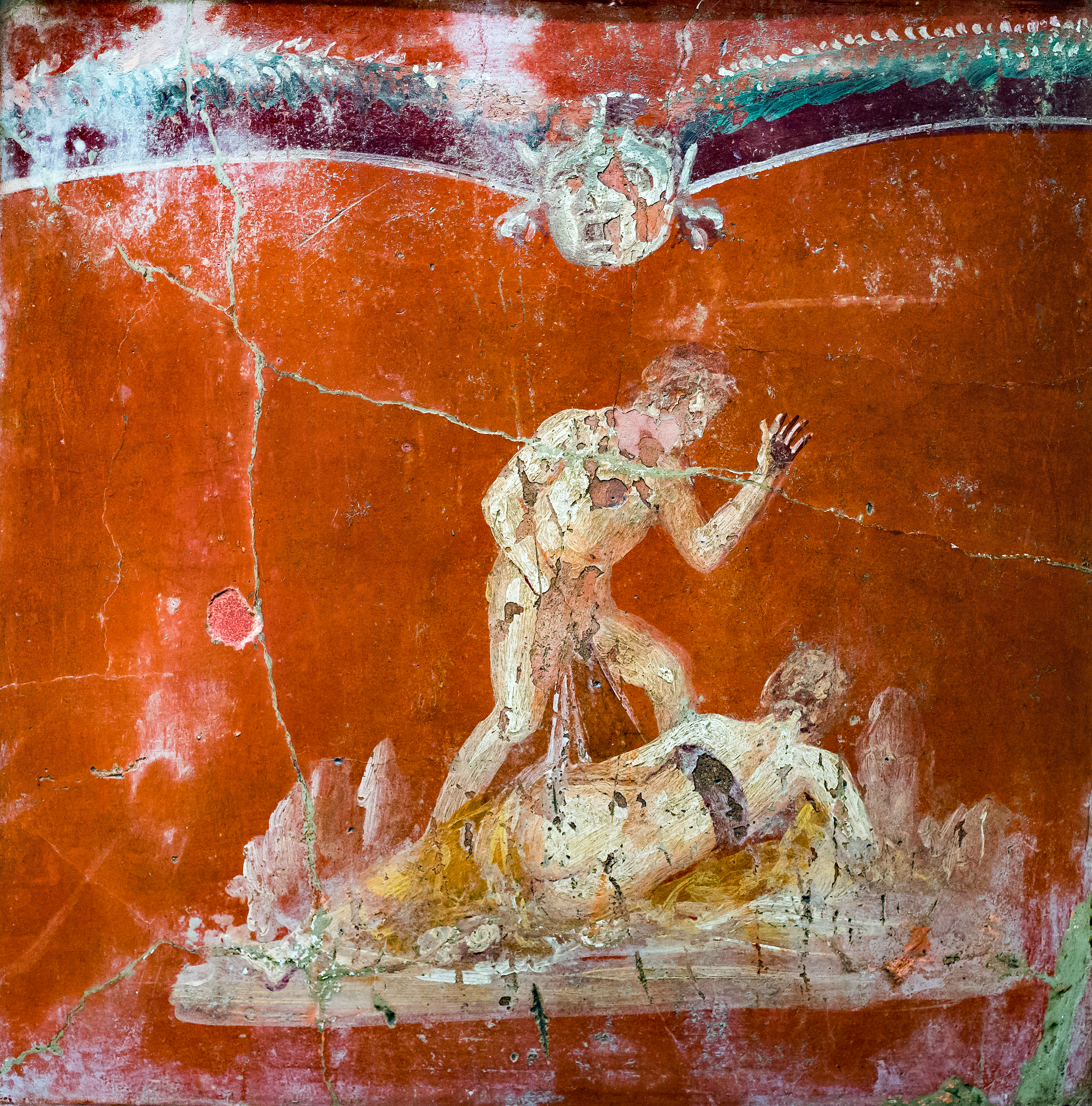
A Nymph or Maenad sleeping in a landscape with a Satyr approaching. From Pompeii. Around 50–79 CE.

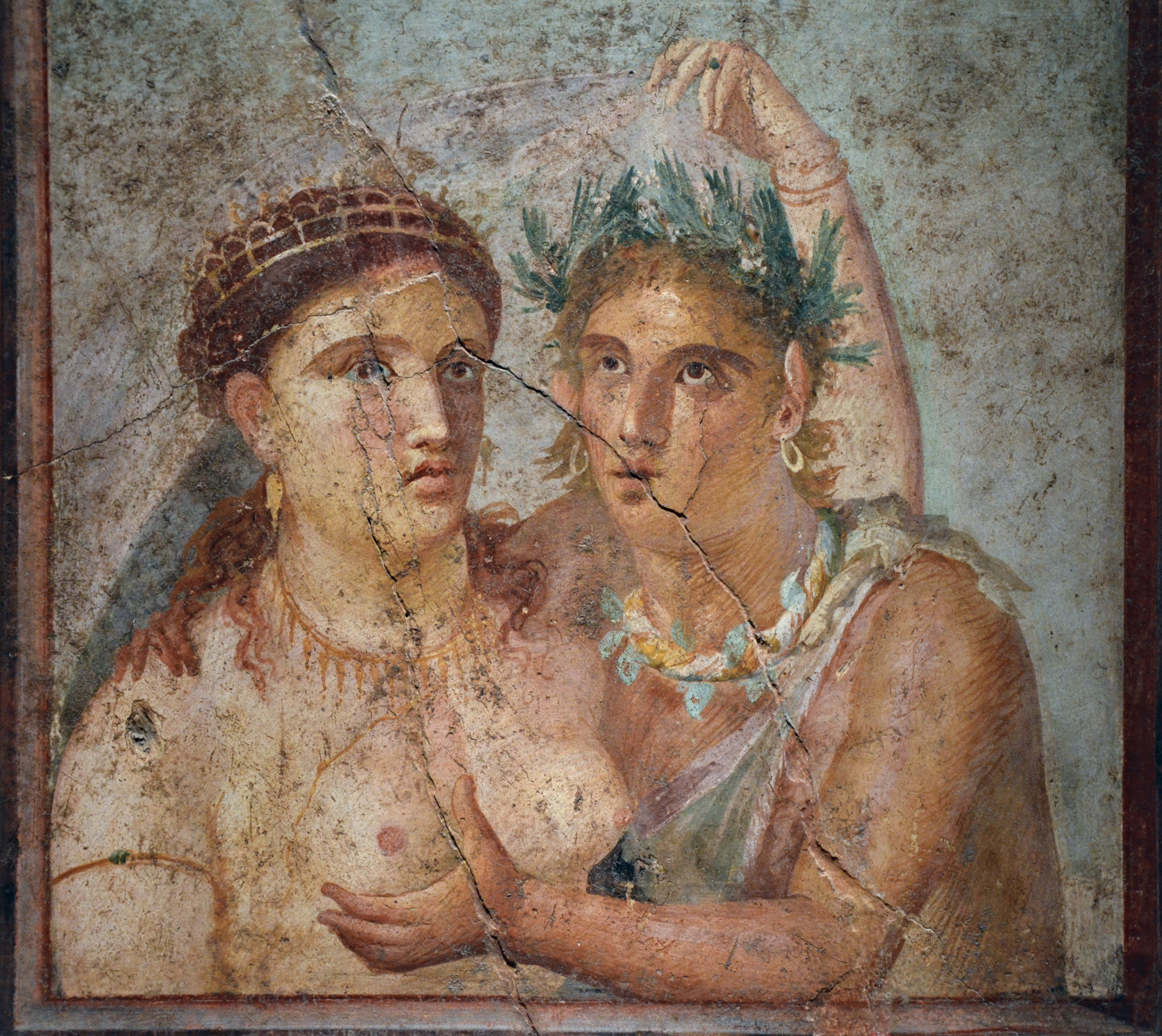
Maenad and a Satyr, from Pompeii
Erotic scenes

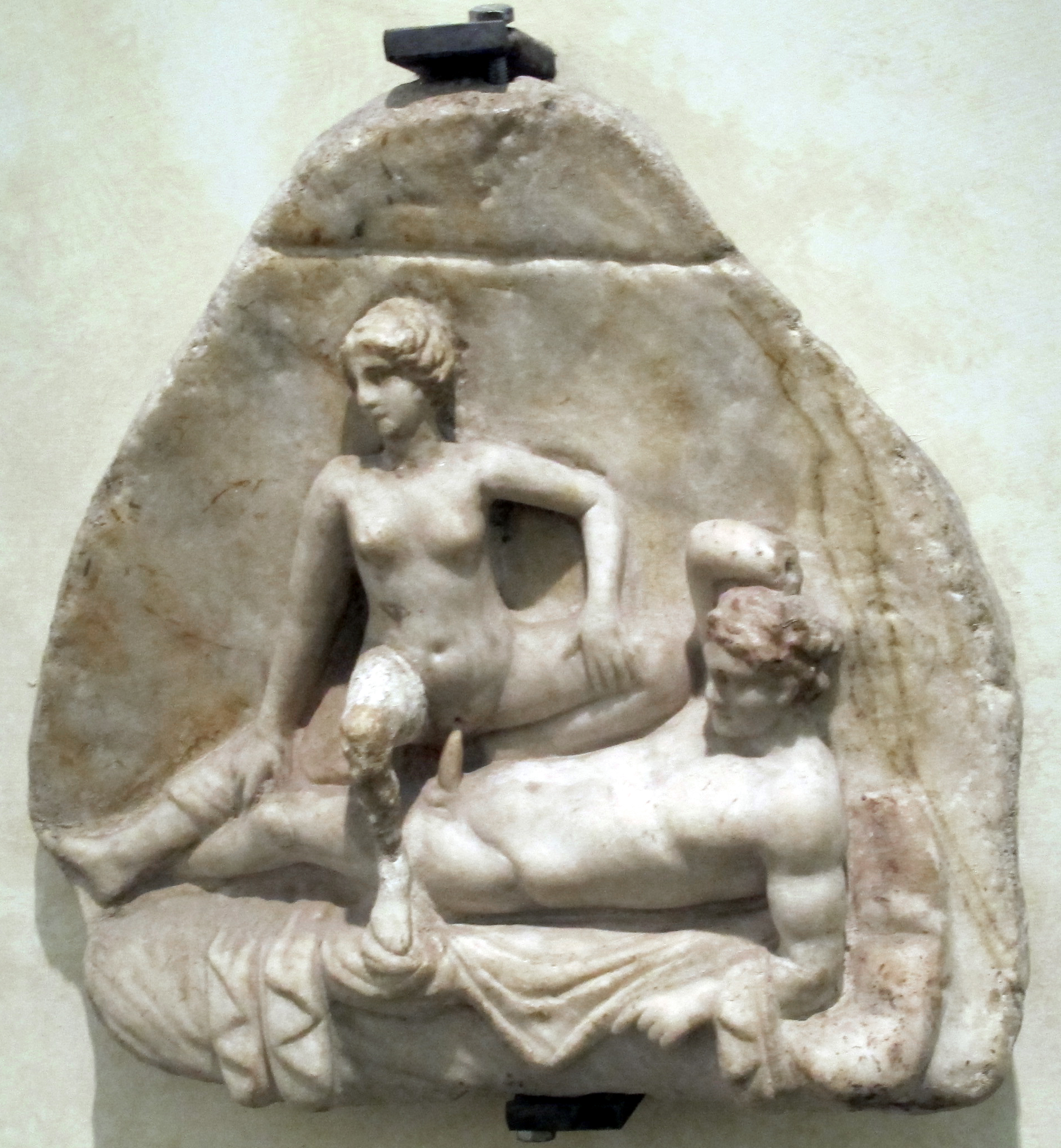
Marble bas-relief from Pompeii. National Archaeological Museum, Naples.

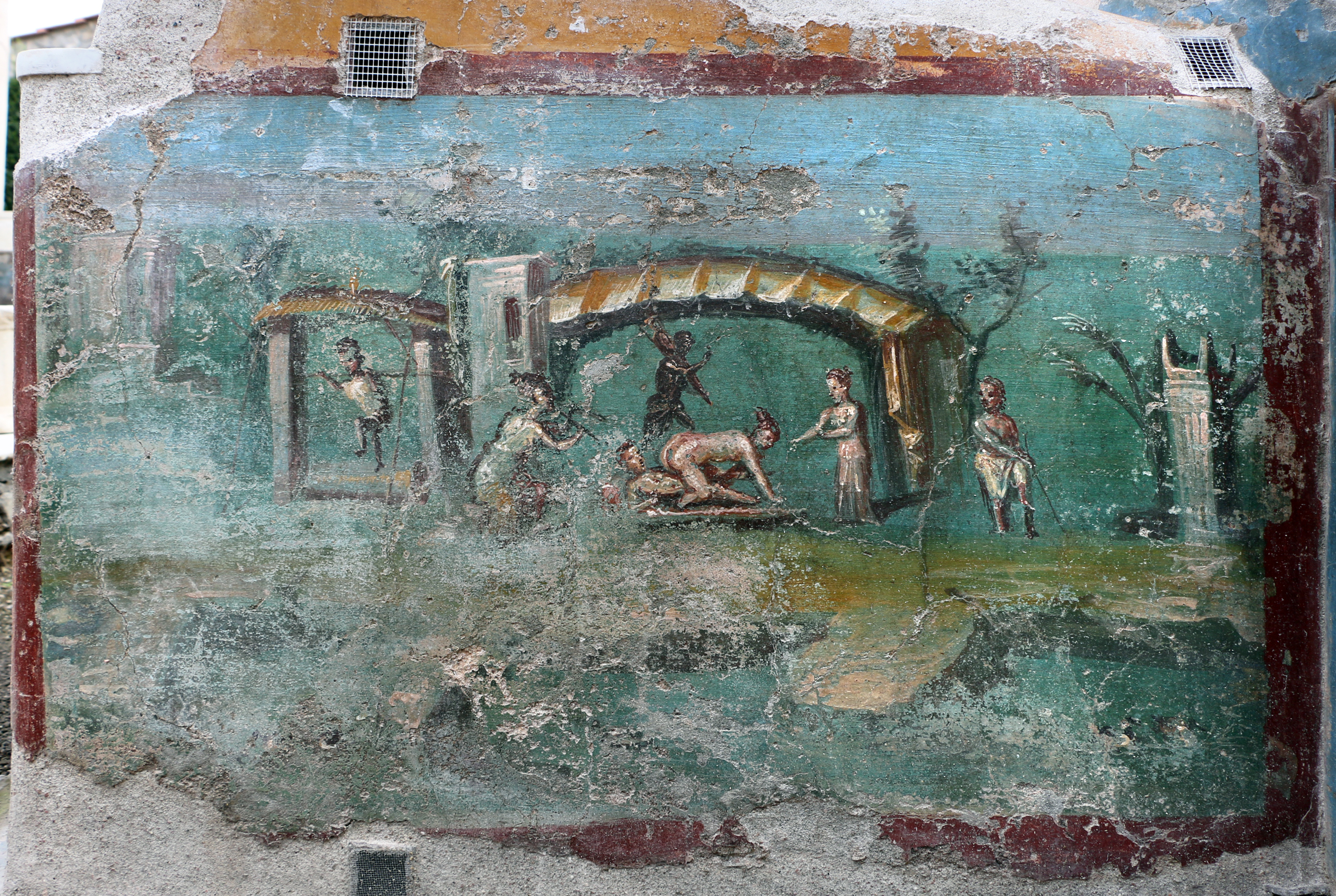
Erotic scene on the Nile. Roman fresco on summer triclinium of the House of the Ephebus. Pompeii.

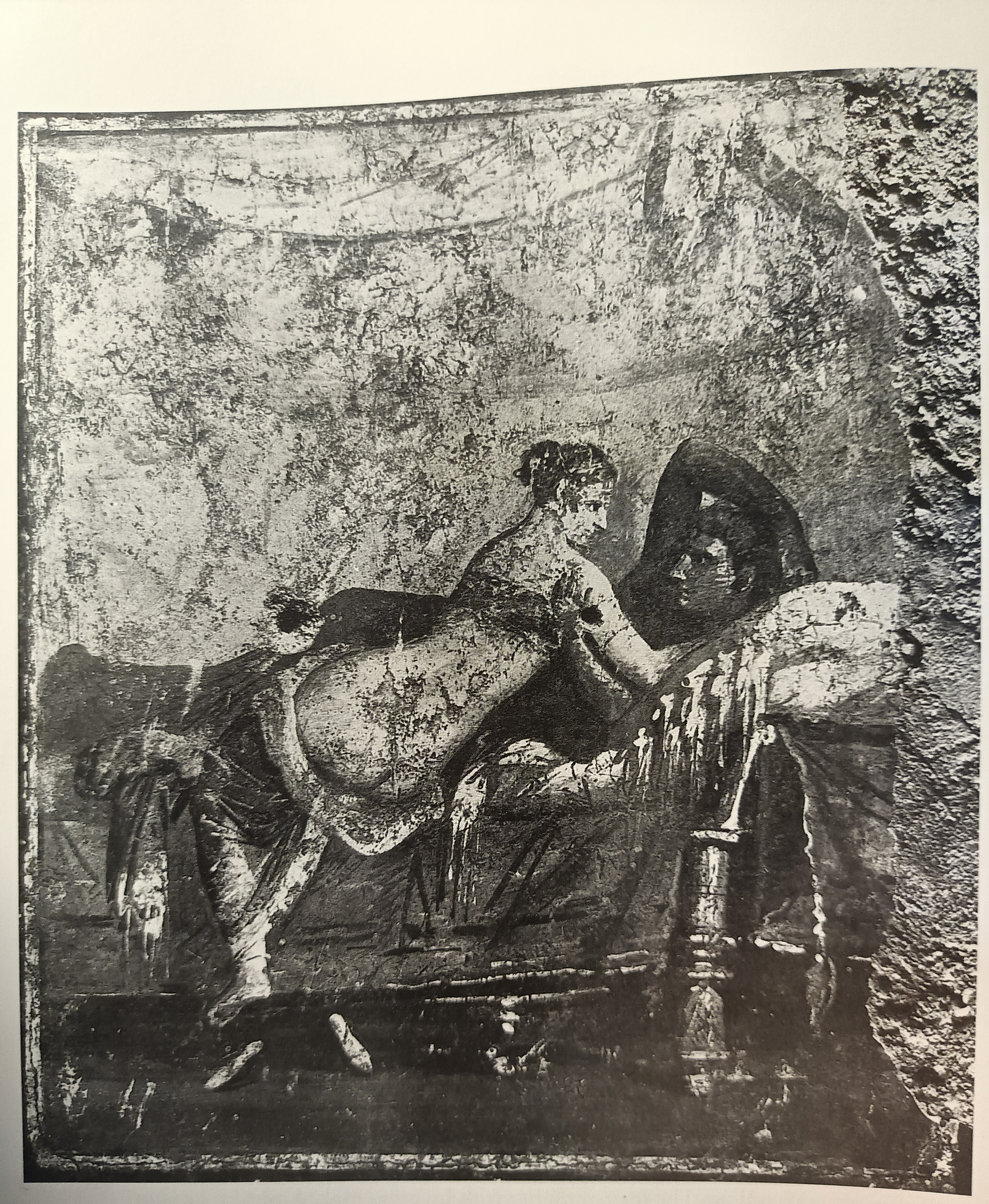
Wall painting from Pompeii. 40 - 45 BCE

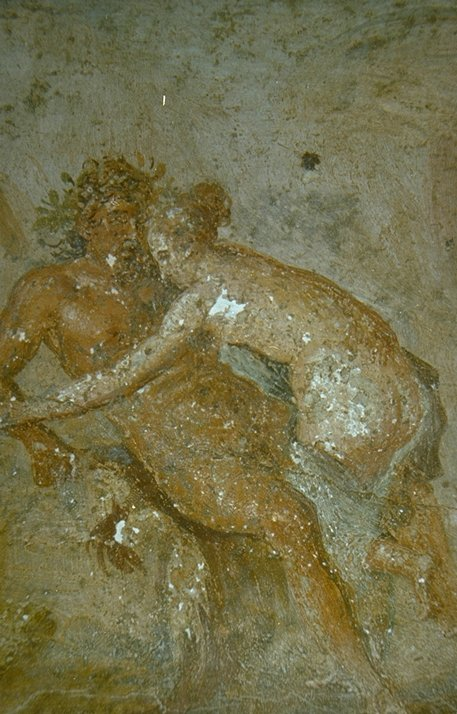
Wall painting from Pompeii.

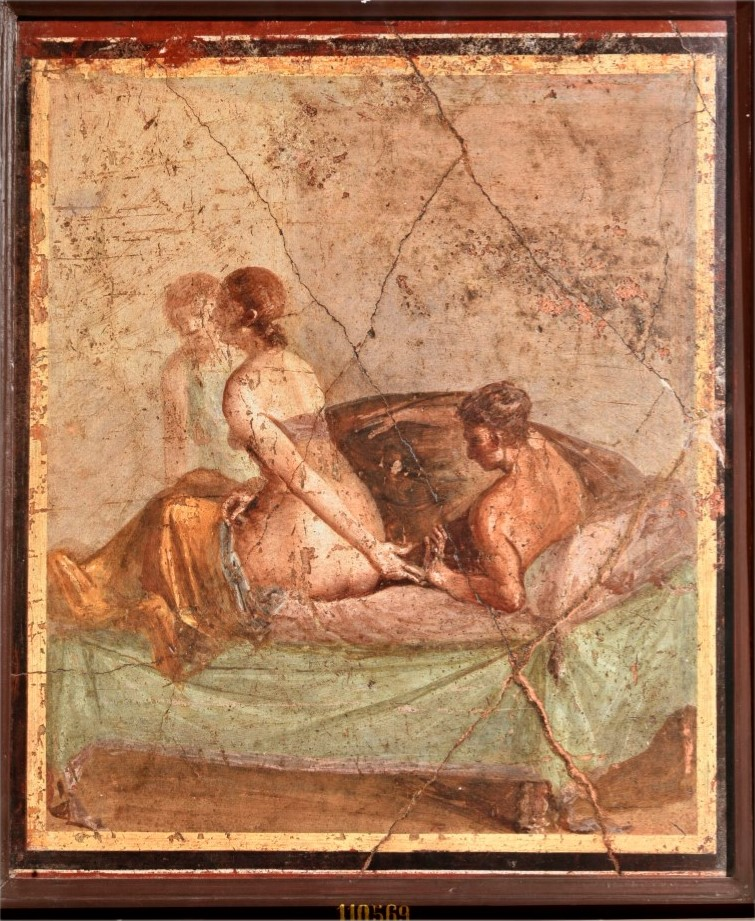
Wall painting from Pompeii. Around 50 to 79 CE.

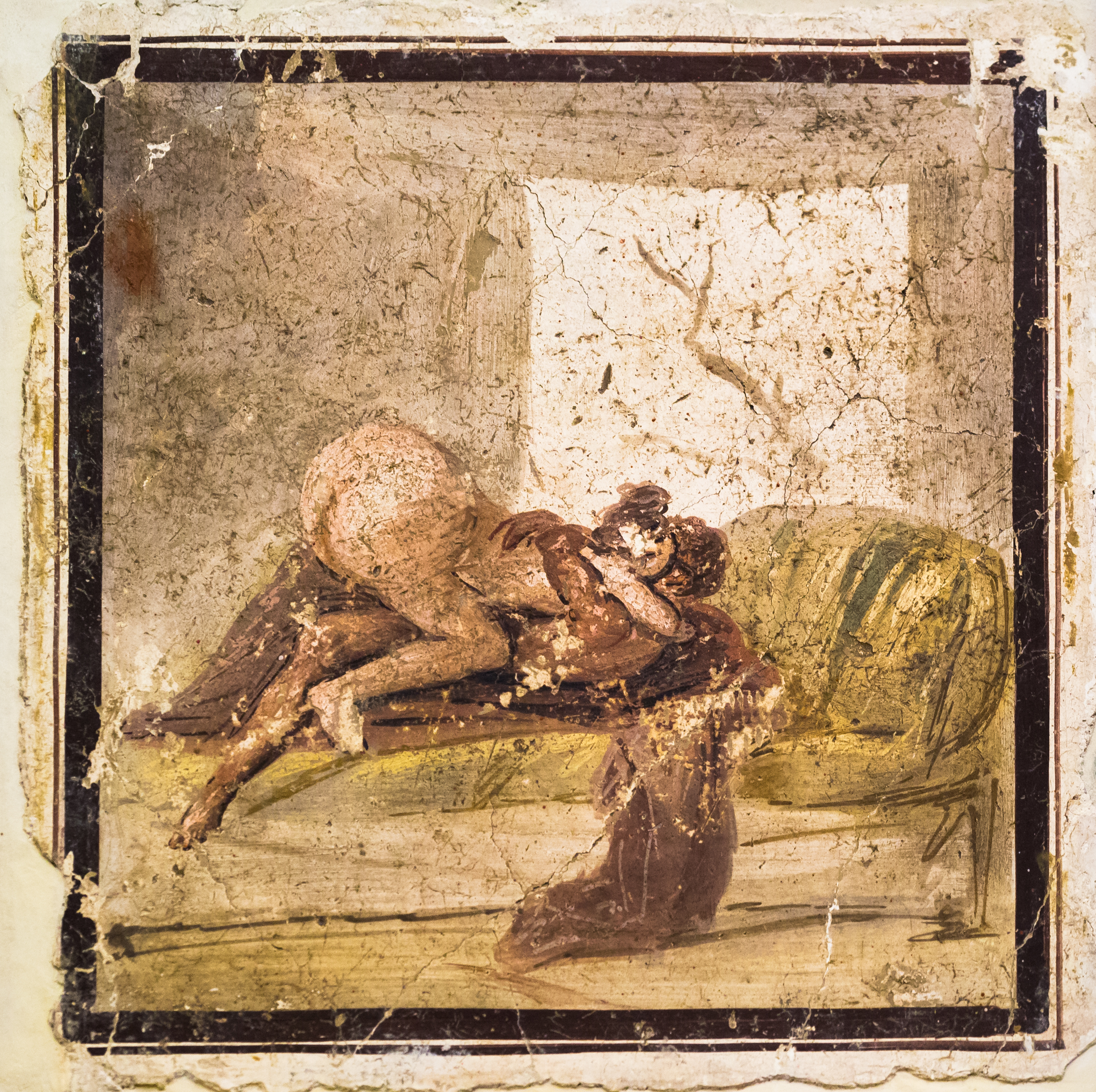
Wall painting from Pompeii

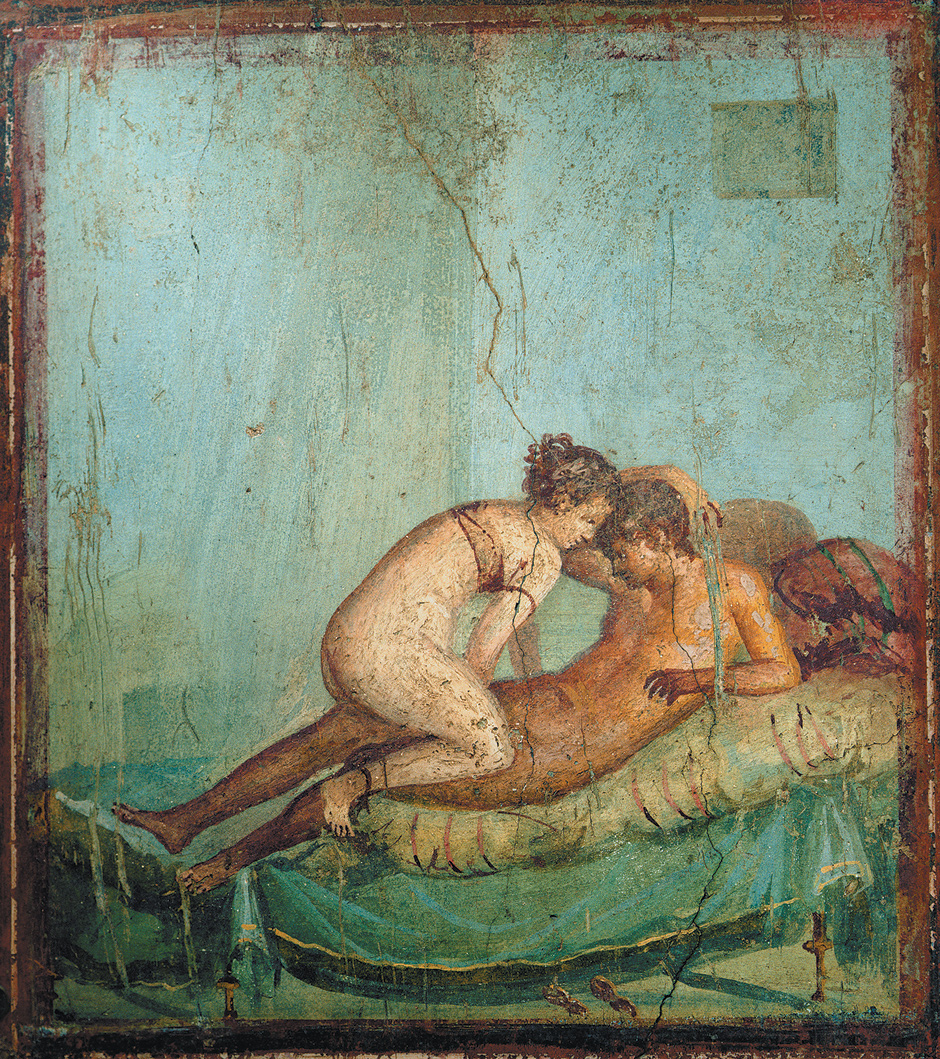
Sex between a female and a male.The figure on the left is wearing a strophium which is a kind of bra or bikini top. From the House of the Centenary, Pompeii. Around 70CE

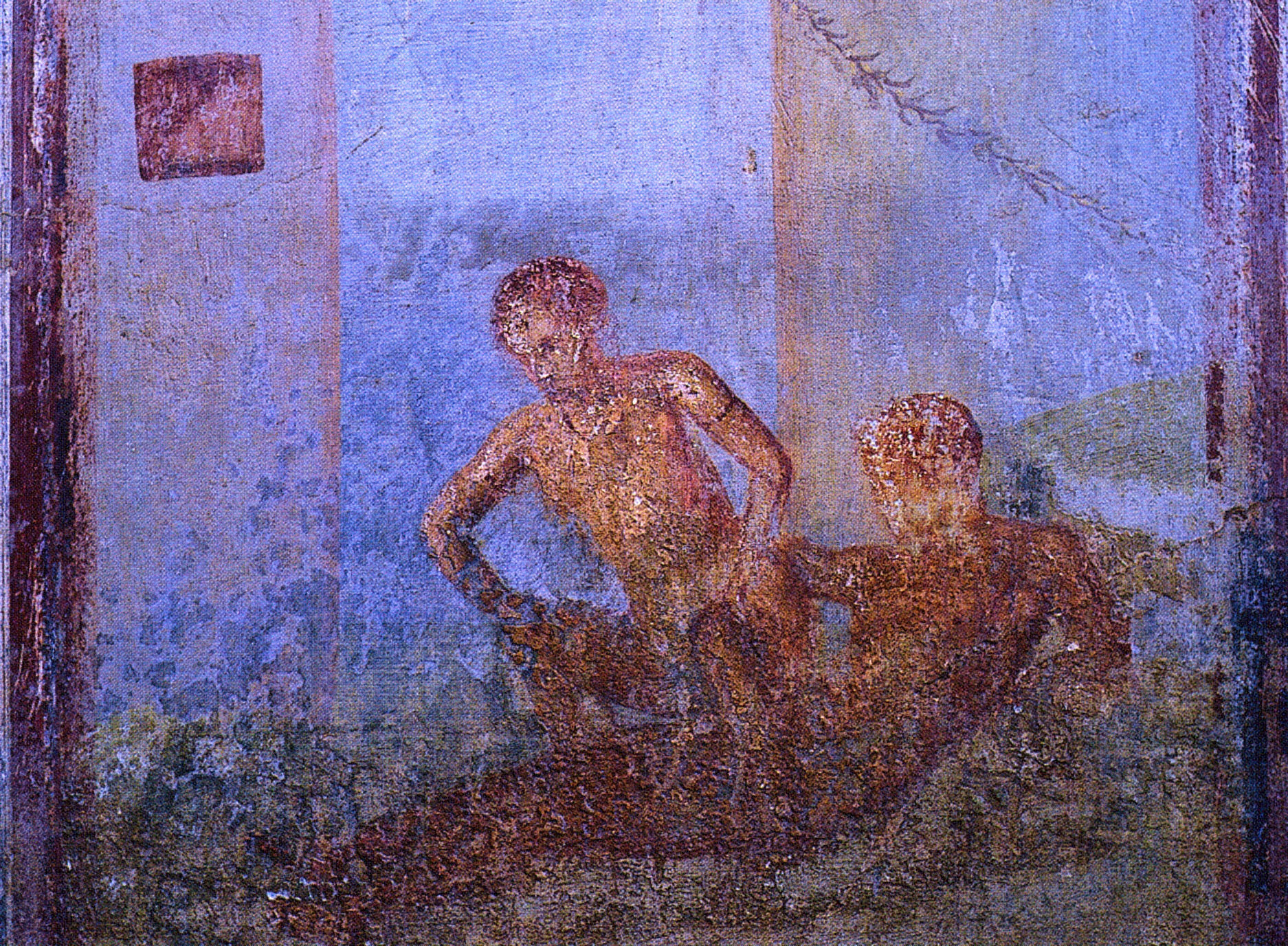
Wall painting. Pompeii. 1st century CE

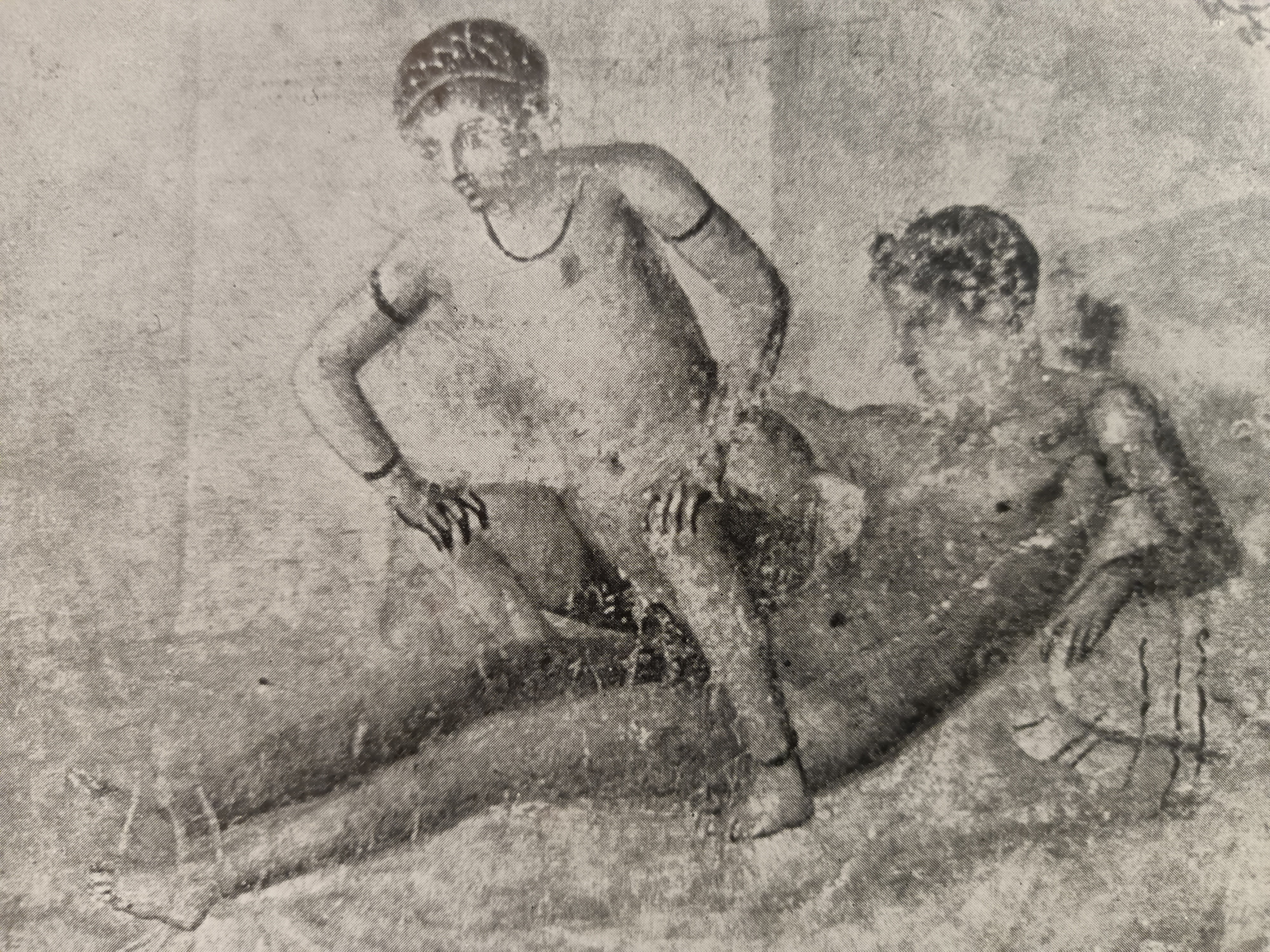
A second image of the same wall painting. Pompeii. 1st Century CE

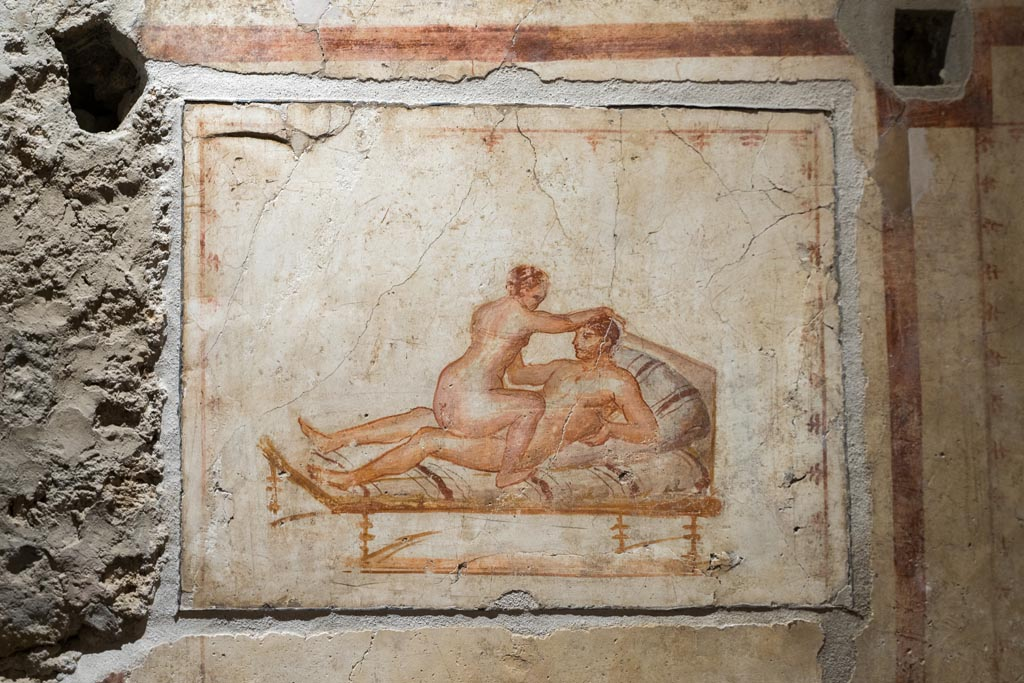
An erotic wall painting on the west wall of a small room at the side of the kitchen from The House of the Vettii, Pompeii.

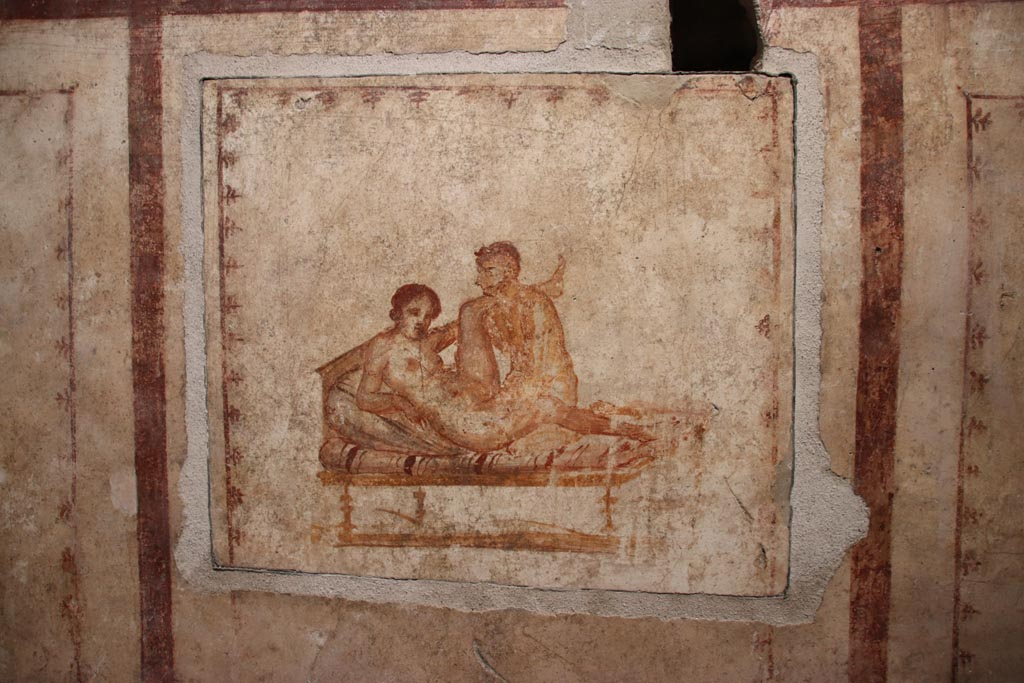
Erotic wall painting East wall. House of the Vetti, from Pompeii

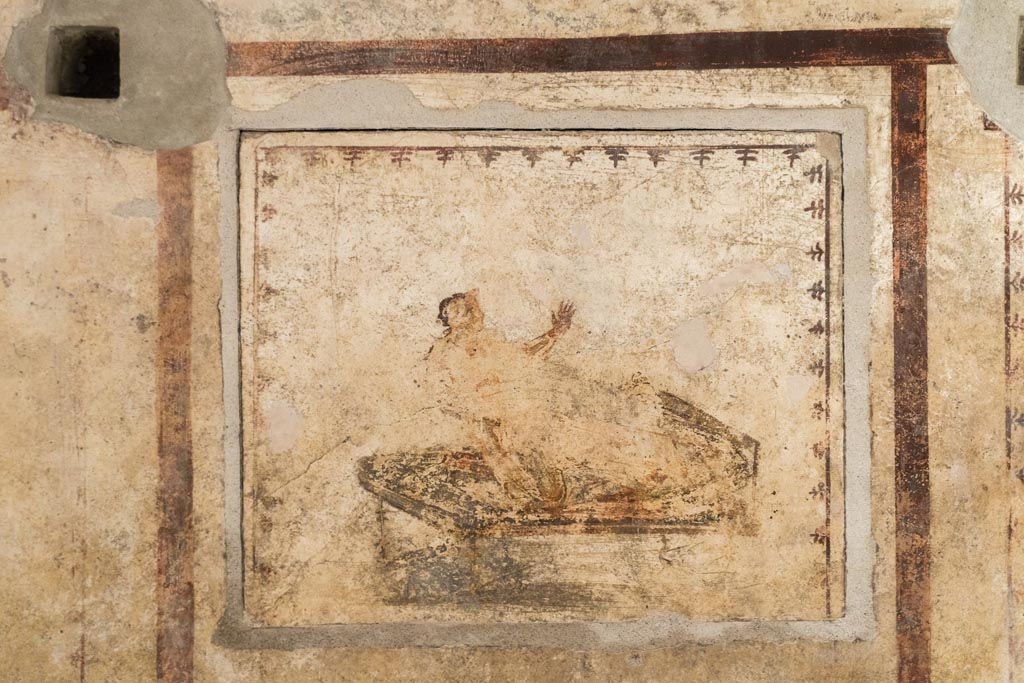
Erotic wall painting. North Wall, House of the Vetti. from Pompeii

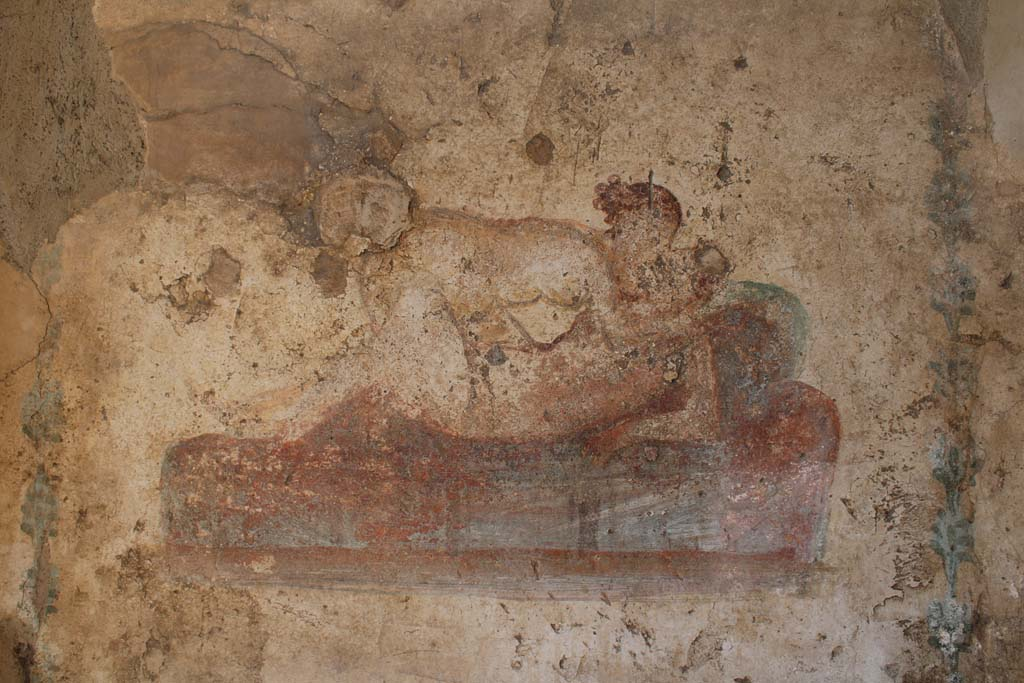
Erotic wall painting. South wall. Casa del Ristorante. Pompeii

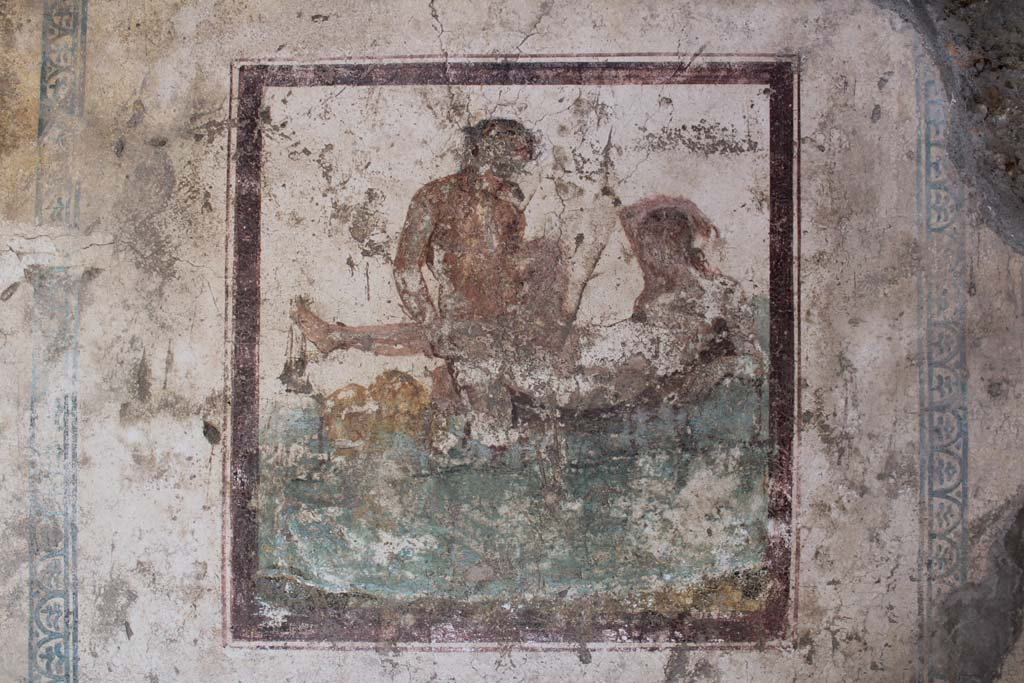
Erotic wall painting. West wall. Casa del Ristorante. Pompeii

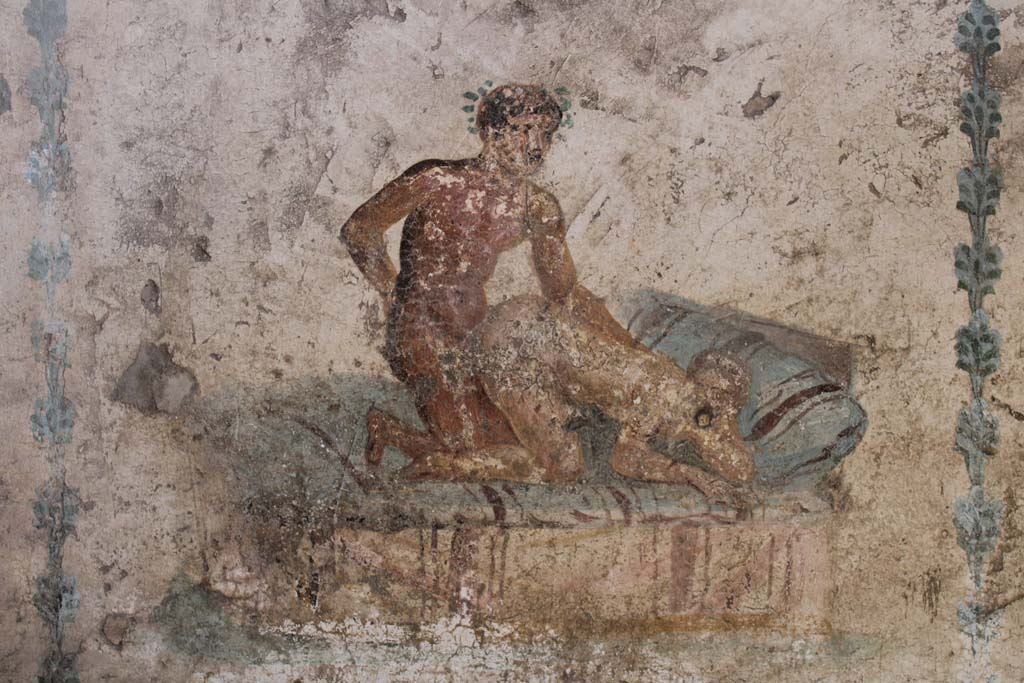
Erotic wall painting. North wall Casa del Ristorante. Pompeii

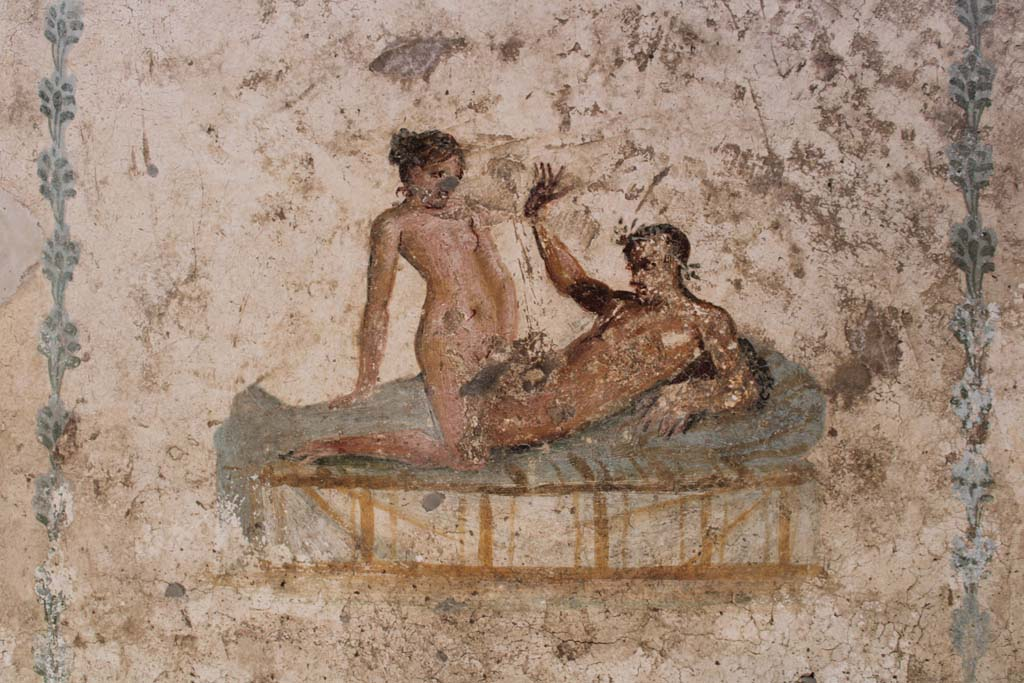
Erotic wall painting. North wall. Casa del Ristorante. Pompeii

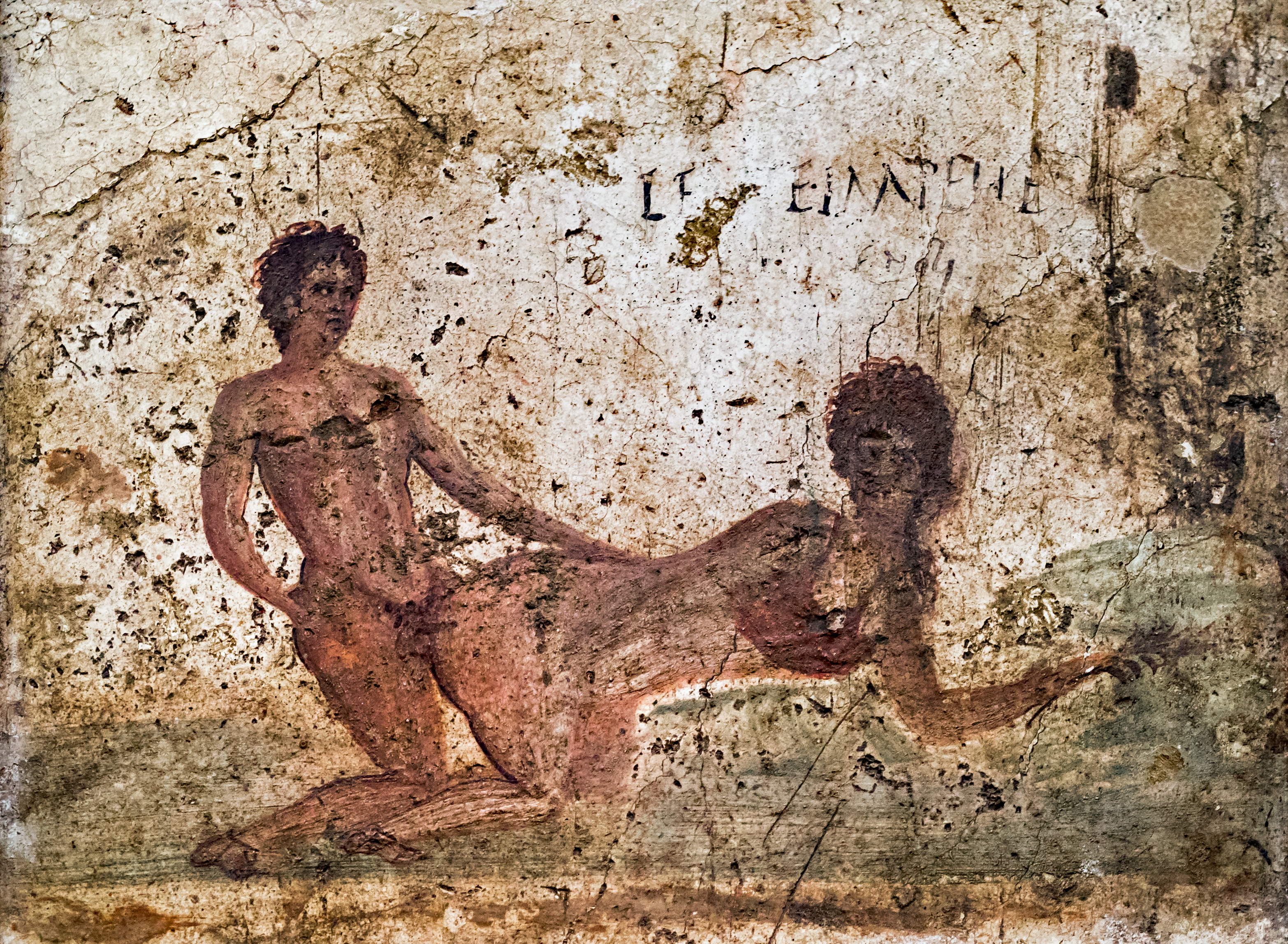
Erotic wall painting, House of the King of Prussia, Pompeii

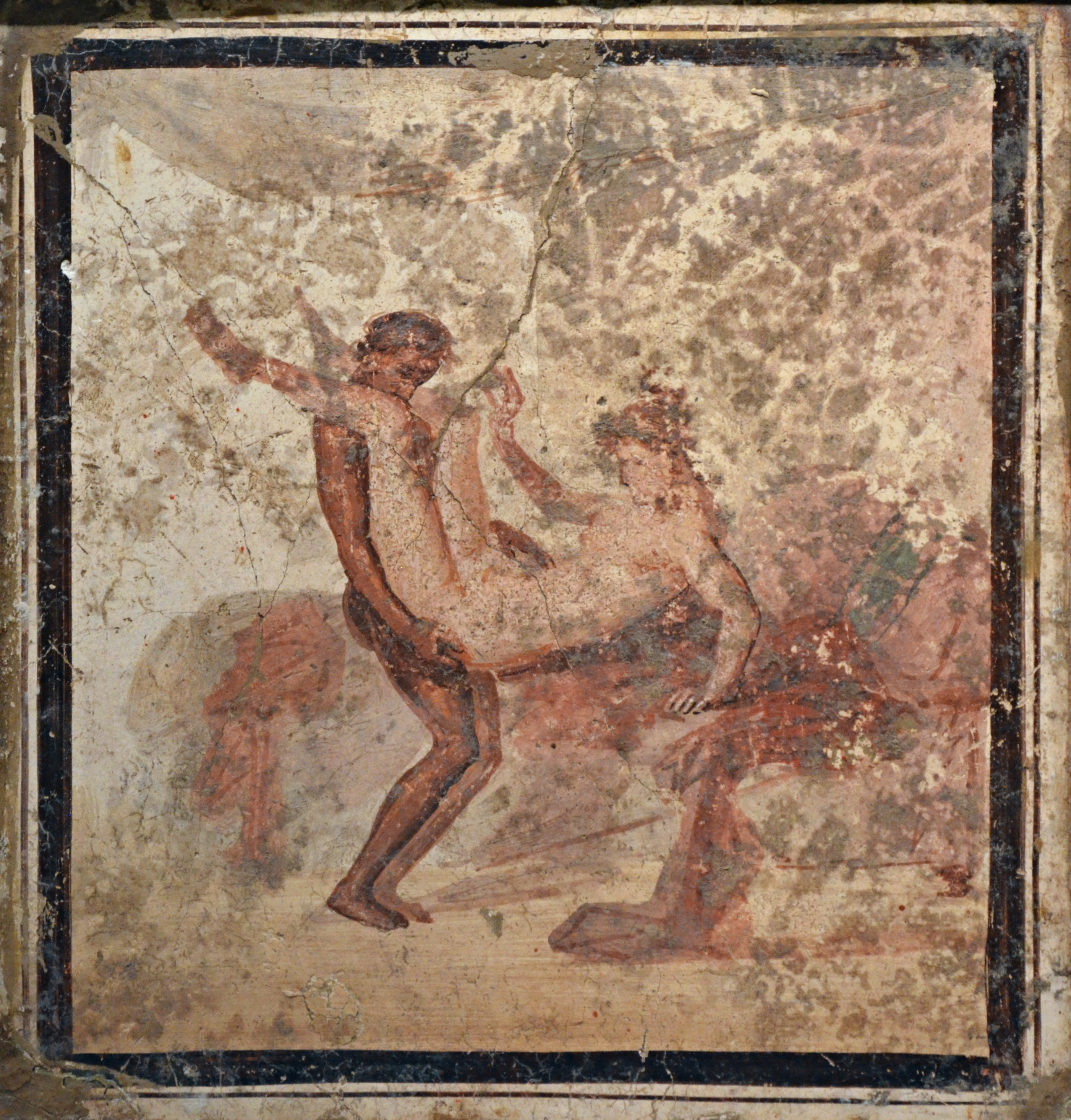
Erotic wall painting, from Pompeii, National Archaeological Museum, Naples.

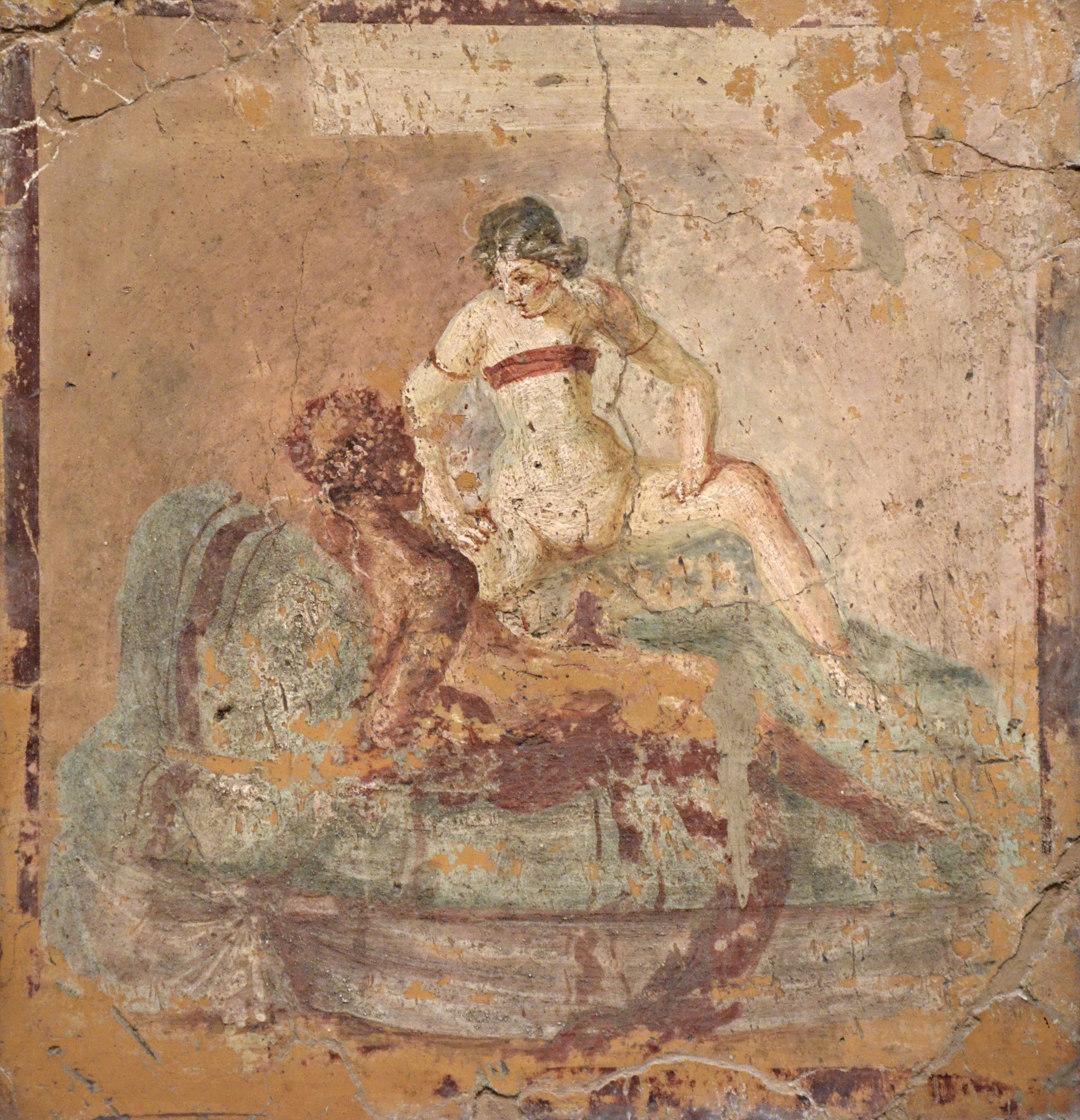
Sex between a female and a male.The figure on the left has a garland of rose petals around their head. The figure to the right is wearing a strophium which is a kind of bra or bikini top. Pompeii. Around 70CE

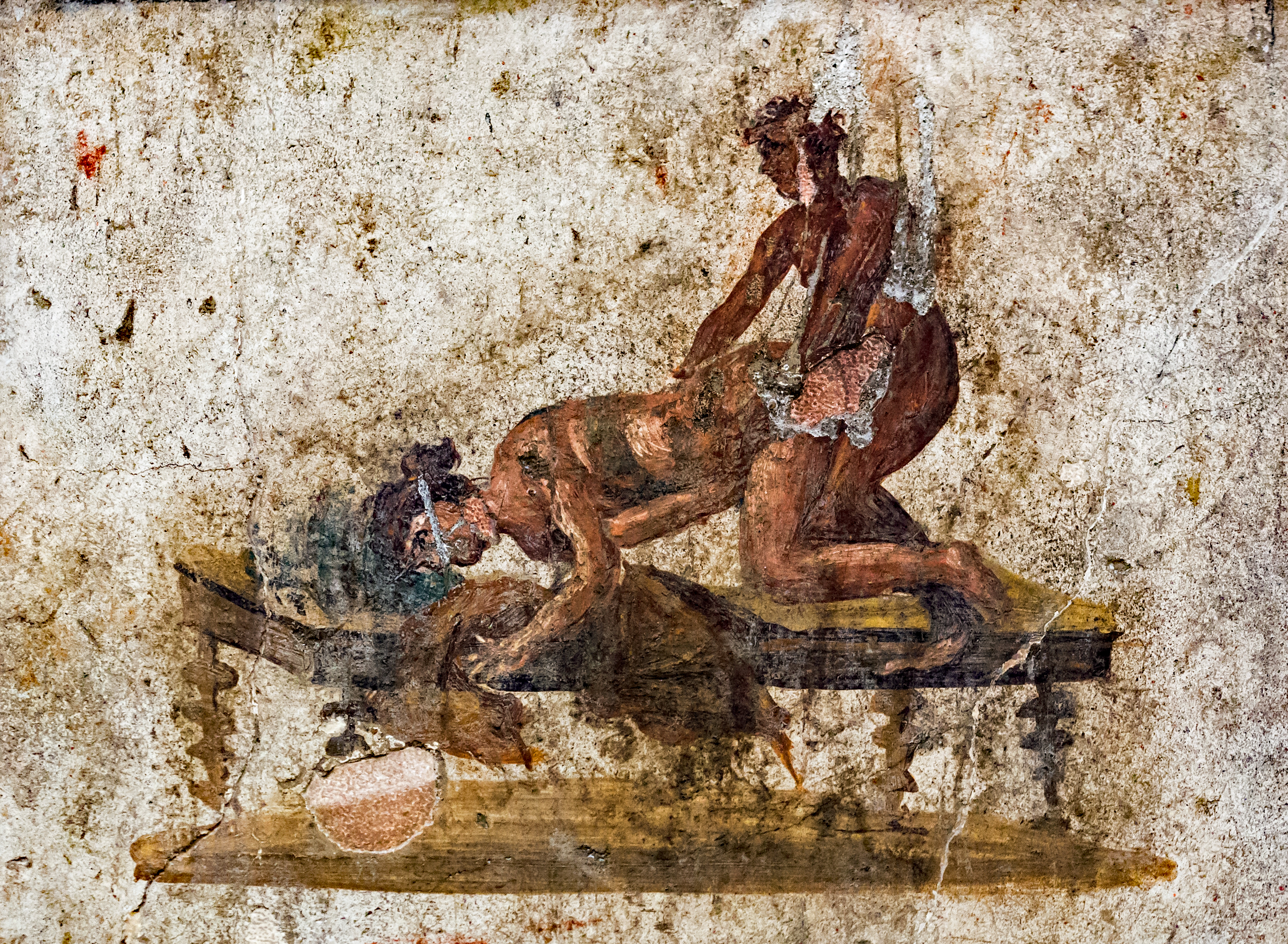
Erotic wall painting, from Pompeii. National Archaeological Museum, Naples.

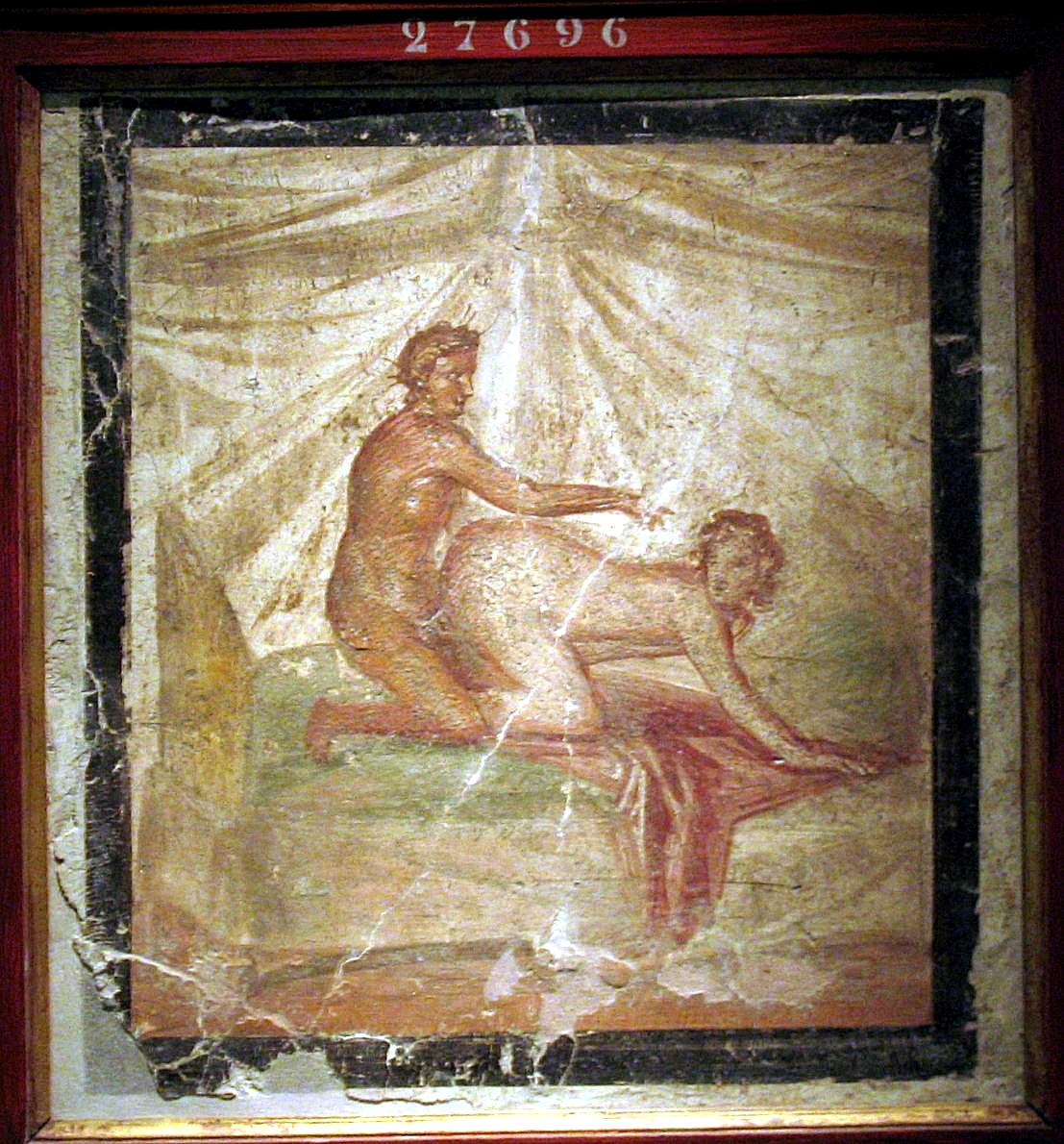
Erotic wall painting, from Pompeii. National Archaeological Museum, Naples. 62 - 79 CE

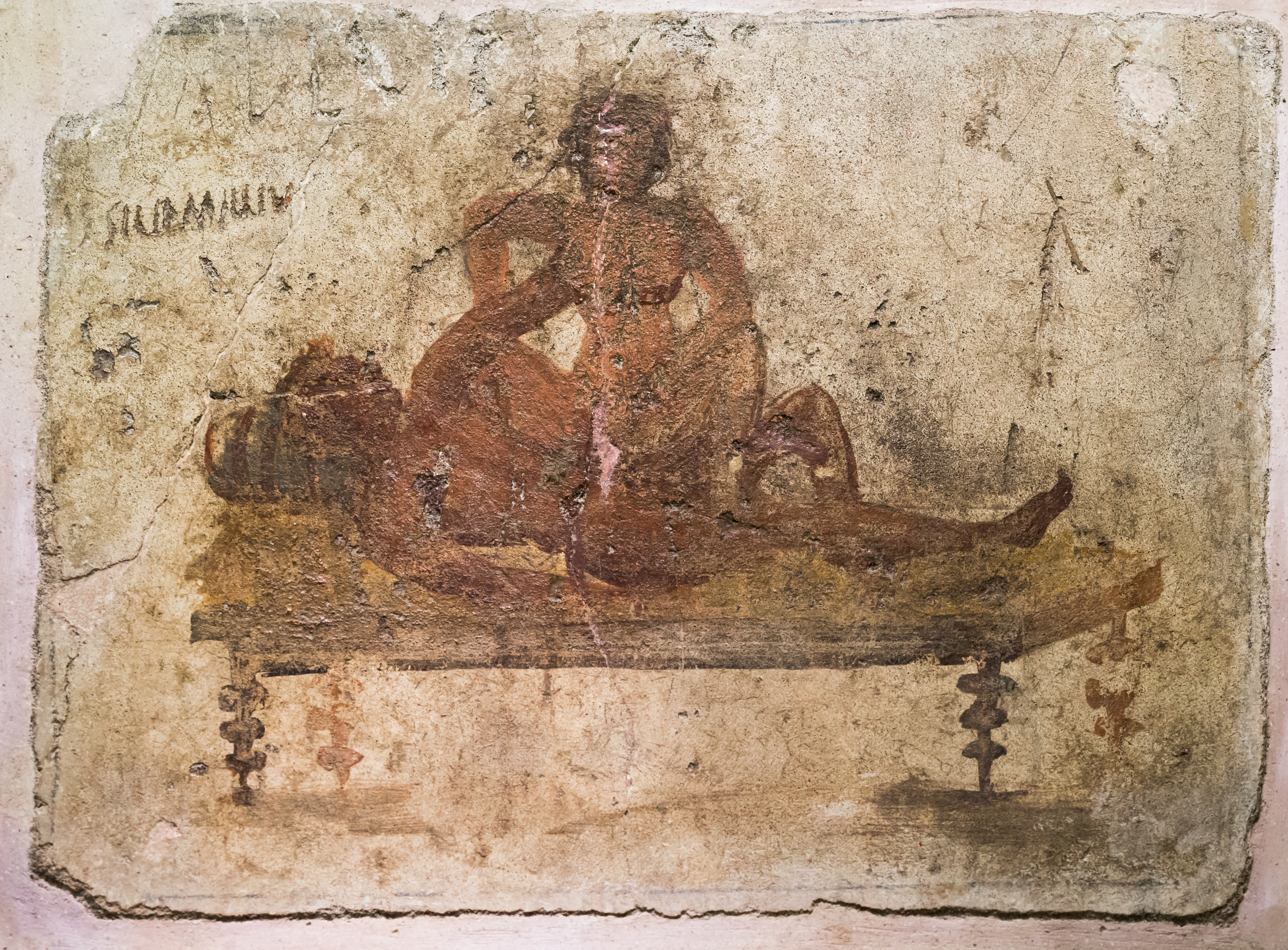
Erotic wall painting, from Pompeii. National Archaeological Museum, Naples.

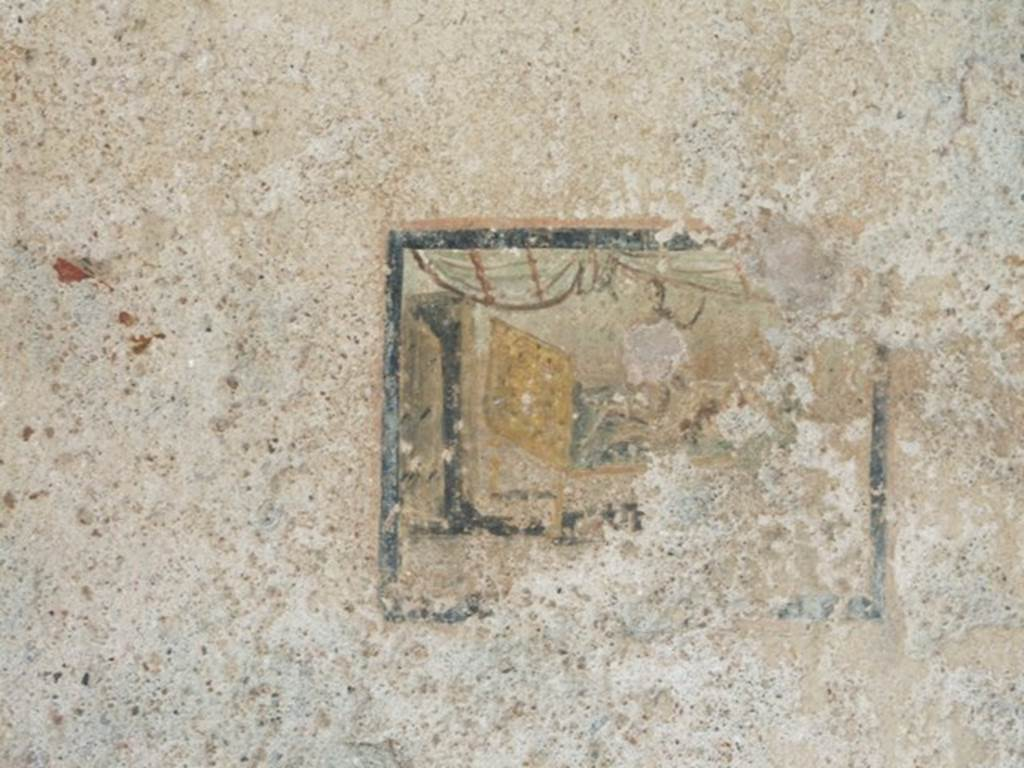
Sexual scene - House at I. 13, 16 - Pompeii

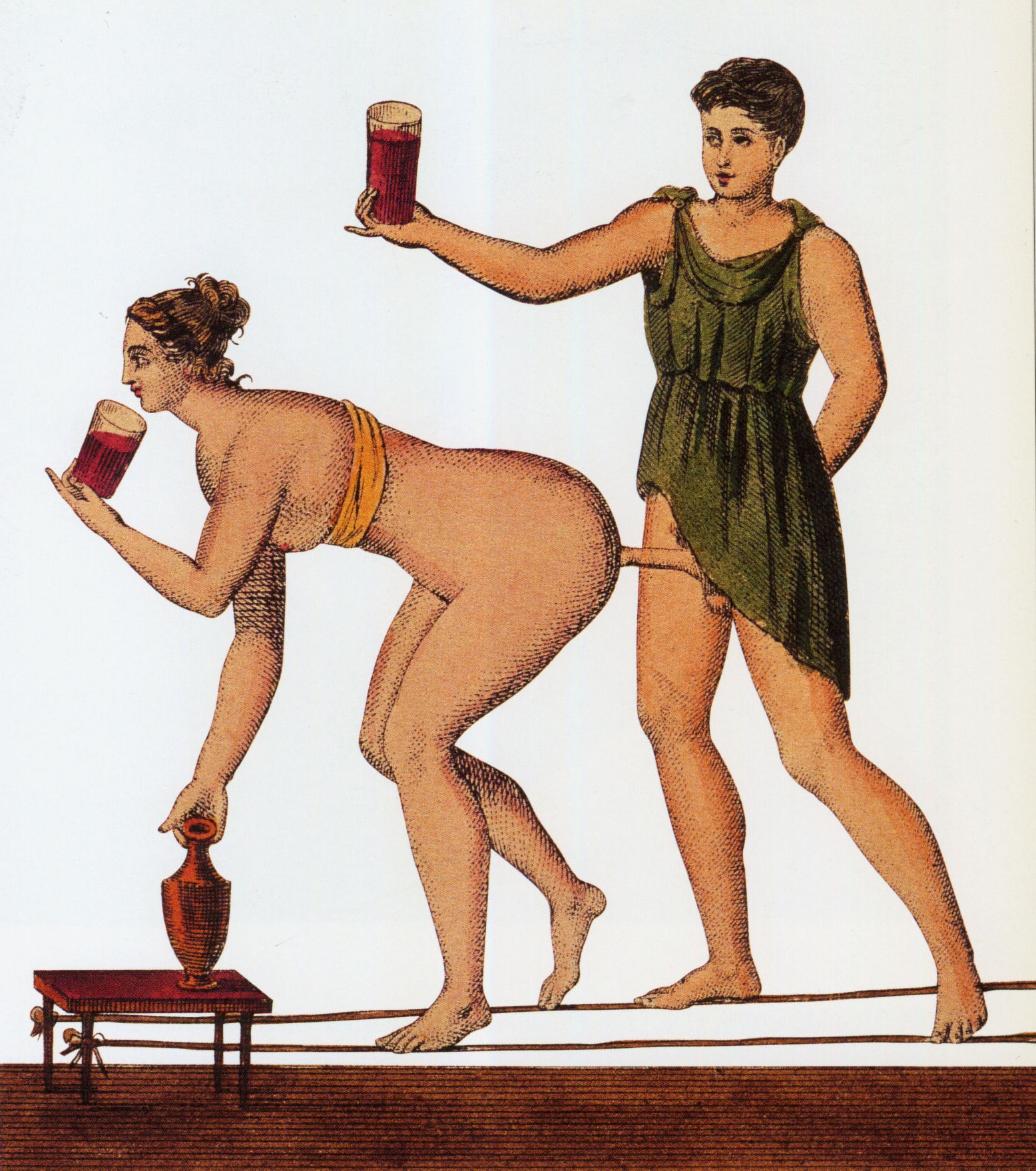
Drawing by César Famin of a Roman fresco from the Osteria della Via di Mercurio in Pompeii. It is thought that the fresco showed the two people above two lines and these two lines were shadows. It is thought that in this drawing the two lines have been drawn as tightropes that the two people are balancing on. The fresco has since been destroyed. This drawing is dated to 1827.

== See also ==
- History of erotic depictions
- History of human sexuality
- Homosexuality in ancient Greece
- Homosexuality in ancient Rome
- Lupanar
- Pederasty in ancient Greece
- Sexuality in ancient Rome
- Roman art
