= Stabian Baths =

Ancient Roman baths in Pompeii, Italy

- Italian: Terme Stabiane
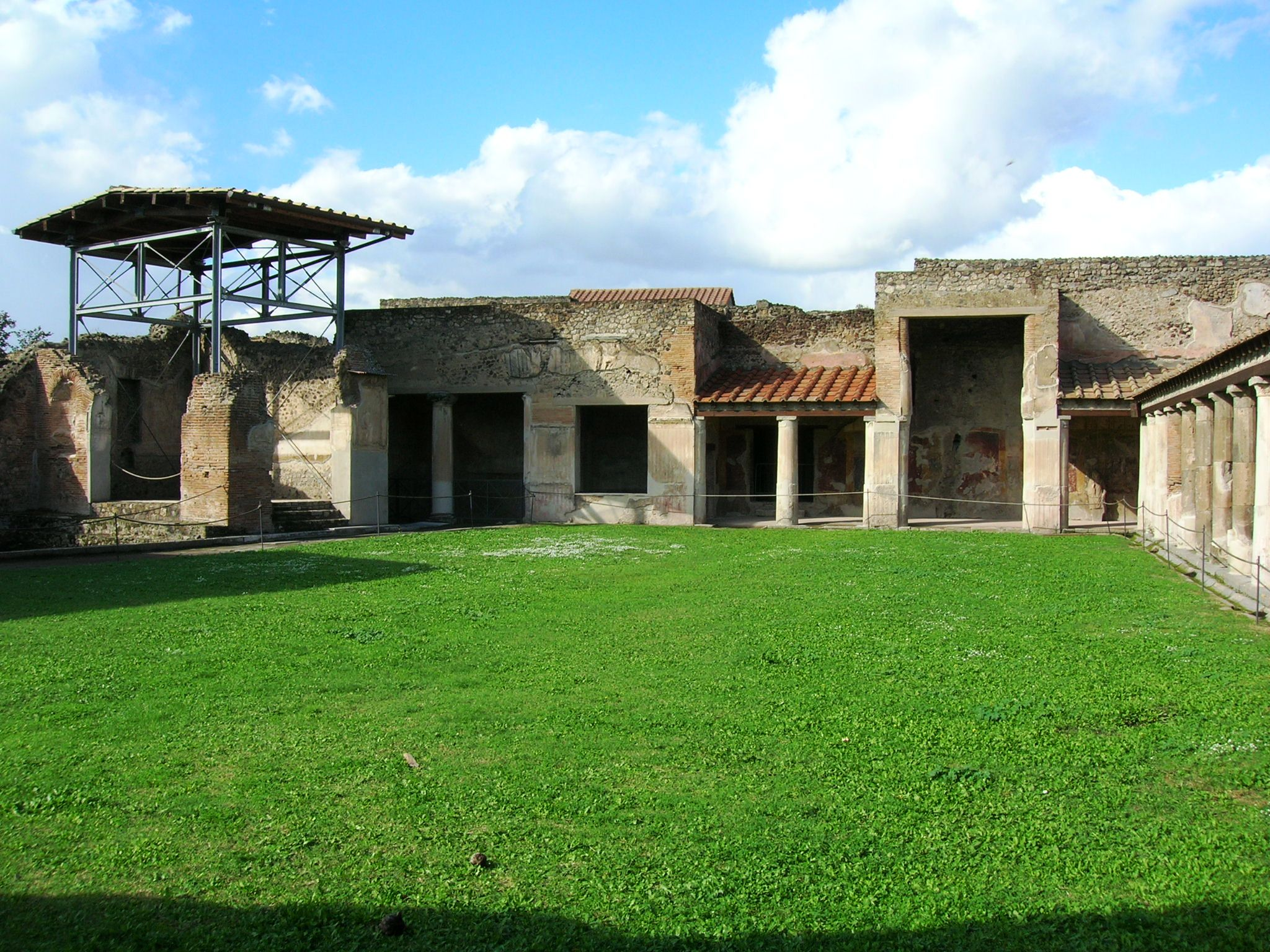
- Palaestra of the Stabian Baths
- Interactive map of Stabian Baths
- Location: Pompeii, Italy

Pompeii map of public buildings

The Stabian Baths are an ancient Roman bathing complex in Pompeii, Italy. They were the oldest and the largest of the five public baths in the city and centrally located at the intersection of two main streets. Their original construction dates to c. 125 BC, making them one of the oldest bathing complexes known from the ancient world. They were remodelled and enlarged many times up to the eruption of Vesuvius in 79 AD.

Excavations in 2021 and 2023 have revised the layout of several phases of the baths and discovered two previously unknown laconica (saunas or sweat baths) under the palaestra courtyard.

== Description ==
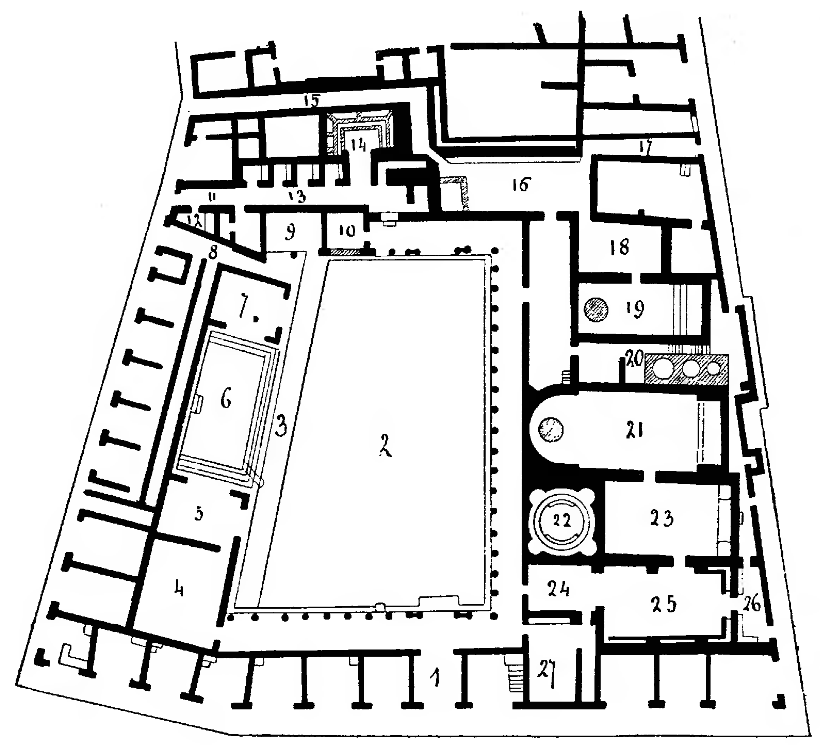
Plan of the Stabian Baths

The Stabian Baths are located at the intersection of two main streets in Pompeii: the Via dell'Abbondanza to the south and the Via Stabiana to the east (the latter gives them their modern name), taking up the whole insula. On the west side, the baths are bordered by the Vicolo del Lupanare, and to the north by the house of P. Vedius Siricus. A row of shops fronted the streets. As was typical of ancient Roman bathhouses, the facilities were divided according to gender.

In their final phase the layout was as follows: the main (men's) entrance was from the Via dell'Abbondanza, through a vestibule (1) into the palaestra (2), a large open-air exercise ground or gymnasium. Other men's entrances were (26) (into the apodyterium or changing room) and (8) from the Vicolo del Lupanare. On the right-hand side of the palaestra is a colonnade which screened the entrance to the men's bath suite: the apodyterium (25), followed by the tepidarium (warm room) (23), caldarium (hot room) (21) and frigidarium (22). These rooms are rectangular, barrel-vaulted and parallel to one another in an arrangement known as the "single-axis row type", the most common model for baths adopted all over the Roman world. On the left-hand side of the palaestra was a swimming pool (natatio) (6); the rooms flanking it (5,7) were nymphaea with garden frescoes painted on the walls above a marble dado (lower portion of the wall above the plinth). The destrictarium (4) (room for preparing before, and cleaning after, gymnastic exercise) adjoining the nymphaeum (5) in the southwest corner of the palaestra has an exterior wall covered with elaborate stucco decoration, once brightly painted. On the left side of the palaestra is a bowling alley (3) with 9 tracks where 2 stone bowling balls were found. To the north is a latrine (14).

The women's baths had two entrances leading to the apodyterium: one on the Vicolo del Lupanare (15) where the word mulier (woman) was found painted over this doorway when the baths were first excavated, the other on the Via Stabiana (17). The women's side had the same facilities (16, 18, 19) with the exception of the frigidarium and palaestra, but the rooms were smaller and much plainer in terms of decoration. In place of the cold room, there was a cold water bath at one end of the apodyterium (16). The women's hot room (19) contains a large marble-lined basin (alveus), about 2 feet deep and with a sloped back for the bathers to rest against, and a labrum, a large, elevated, shallow basin filled with lukewarm water. The remains of a bronze single bath and bronze benches were found when the room was excavated. The walls and floors of the warm and hot rooms were heated by a hypocaust heating system, the earliest surviving example from the Roman world. The heat was produced from a single furnace (20), and circulated in the space under the floors, which were raised on tile pillars. It was located between the men's and women's caldaria; there were three water tanks in this room, one for hot water directly above the furnace, one for lukewarm water, and one for cold.

The men's apodyterium is paved in gray marble bordered by basalt along the walls. The walls were painted in white with a red base, and above them the vaulted ceiling is plastered in elaborate stucco, made up of octagonal, hexagonal and quadrangular panels. They featured cupids, trophies, rosettes, and Bacchic figures. The ceiling of the men's tepidarium features similar stuccowork. The men's frigidarium (formerly laconicum) is a round room with a dome, at the centre of which is an oculus which allows light to enter the room. The basin, which is lined in white marble, is edged by a narrow marble floor. The walls are inset with 4 niches containing fountains and were painted with a beautiful garden fresco, showing vegetation, birds, statues, and vases against a sky-blue background. At one end of the men's tepidarium was a basin, which August Mau reckoned was a "moderately cold bath" for "those who in the winter shrank from using the frigidarium". The hot room contained a labrum, only the base of which remains.

== History ==
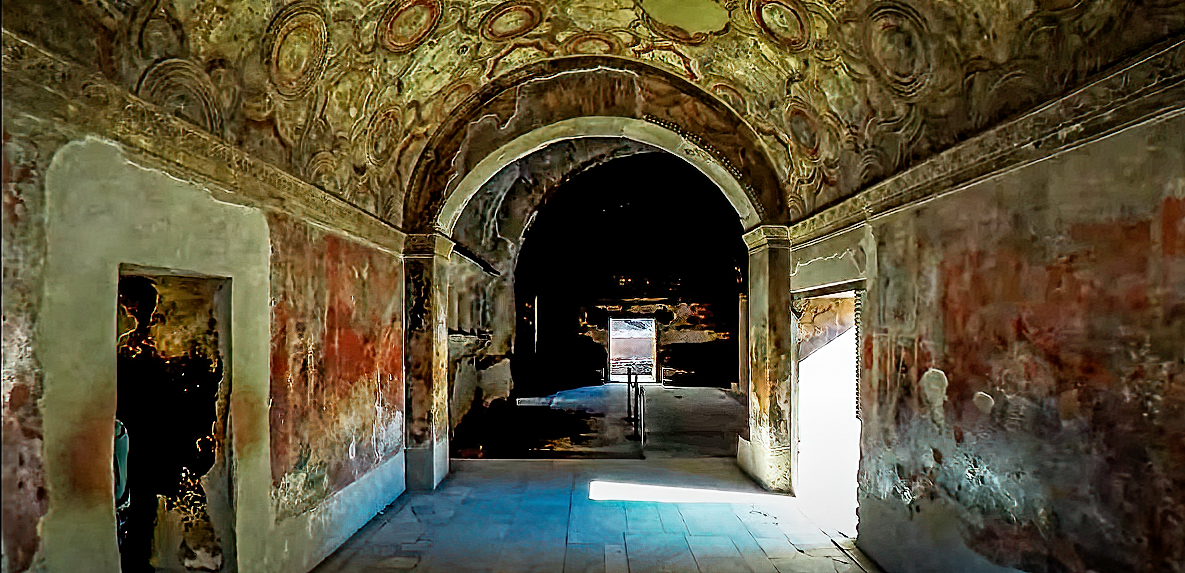
Men's apodyterium

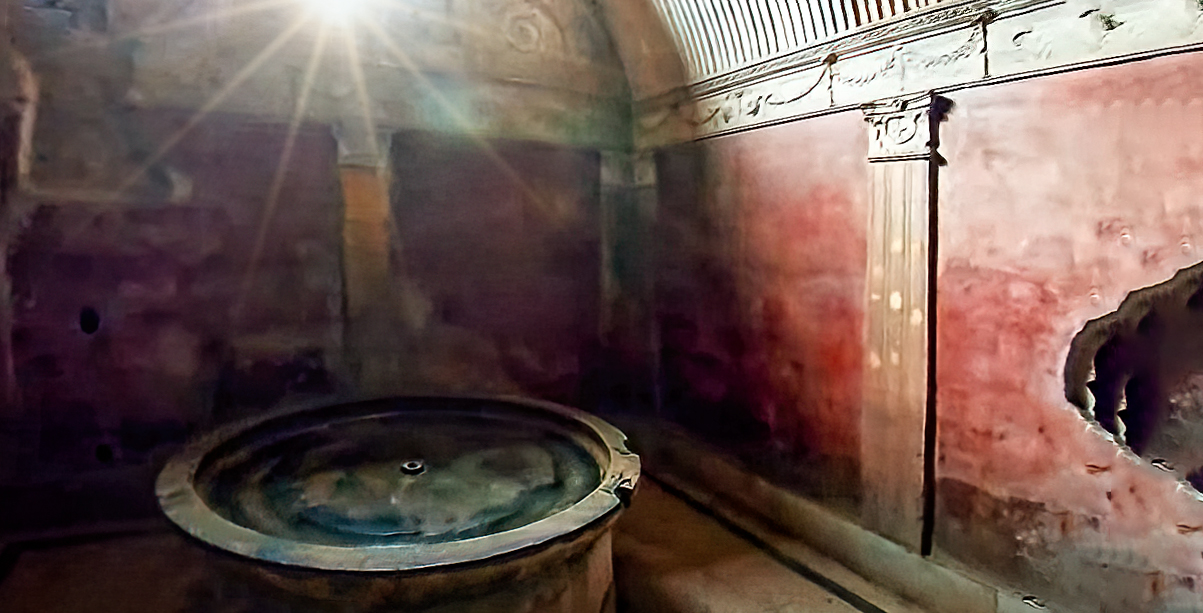
Women's caldarium

Before the construction of the baths proper, the site was used primarily as a palaestra. There were also small rooms containing hip baths to the north during this early period.

In ca. 125 BC, as commemorated by a sundial with an inscription in Oscan found on the site, a magistrate had the first bath building constructed using fines levied by the local administration. The Stabian Baths then became a sizeable building occupying half an insula (city block). The building contained two sets of bath suites each with apodyterium, tepidarium and caldarium, a latrine and, for the men, two laconica (dry-sweating rooms) and the rectangular palaestra with Doric porticoes on three sides. Water was drawn from a well and stored in a reservoir on the roof.

When Pompeii became a Roman colony in 80 BC, the baths were extended by the duoviri (city magistrates) Caius Uulius and Publius Aninius as recorded in an inscription. The two earlier laconica were demolished and the palaestra was extended westwards into the triangular area over their sites, while the eastern portico was moved further west to allow two new rooms to be added in the former portico: a new, more substantial laconicum, using part of the tepidarium, and with a concrete dome and four semi-circular niches in the corners. The destrictarium (room for scraping the body clean with strigils, and the only place this is known in the Roman world) was built north of it in the portico and this probably also served as the entrance to the laconicum.

The work having been undertaken by the duoviri suggests that the Stabian Baths were publicly owned.

Around the turn of the first century AD under Augustus, running water was supplied to the baths for the first time when they were connected to the city's aqueduct. It is likely that around this time the house to the west of the palaestra was demolished to make room for an outdoor swimming pool (natatio) with two nymphaea with shallow pools on either side, a bowling alley and a second changing room. The shallow pools may have been used by patrons to wash their feet before they entered the swimming pool. Open rooms, probably exedrae, were added to the north wing of the baths facing onto the palaestra.

The Stabian Baths were damaged in the AD 62 Pompeii earthquake, but were rebuilt, significantly enlarged and remodelled to today's visible size to make them even more luxurious. It may be that at this time the impressive main entrance was created to replace the old small entrance, the laconicum was converted into a frigidarium and the destrictarium was demolished to enlarge the caldarium and a new destrictarium created in the southwest corner of the palaestra . The baths appear to have been at least partially closed and undergoing a general repair/remodel, like many buildings in Pompeii, when the eruption of Vesuvius took place in 79.

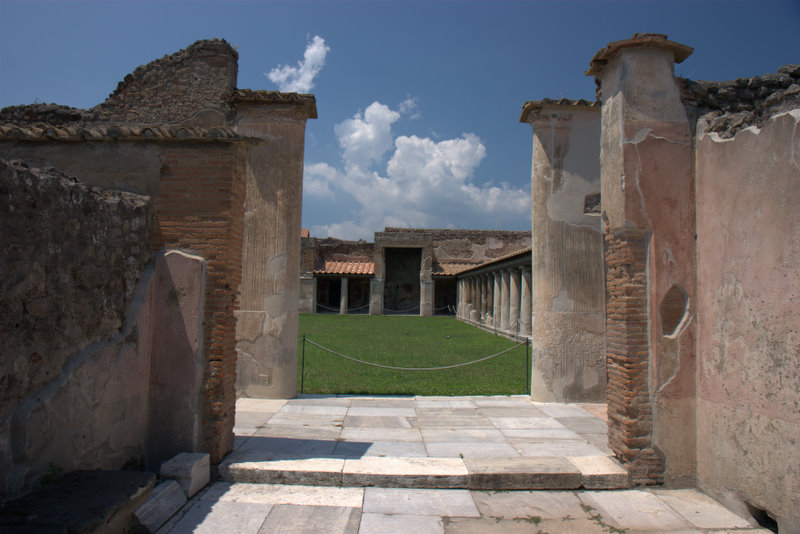
Entrance from Via dell'Abbondanza

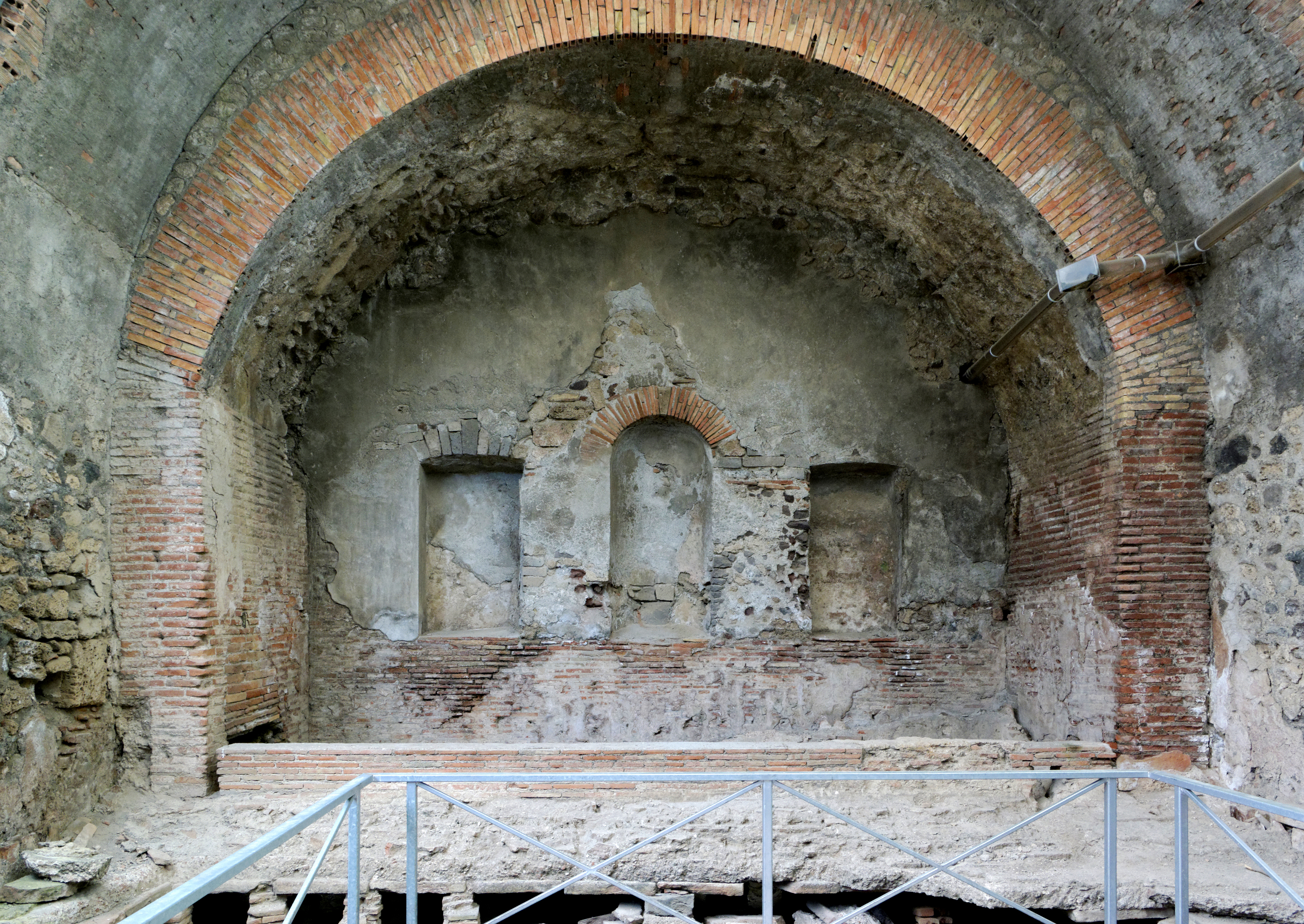
Men's caldarium, with hypocaust

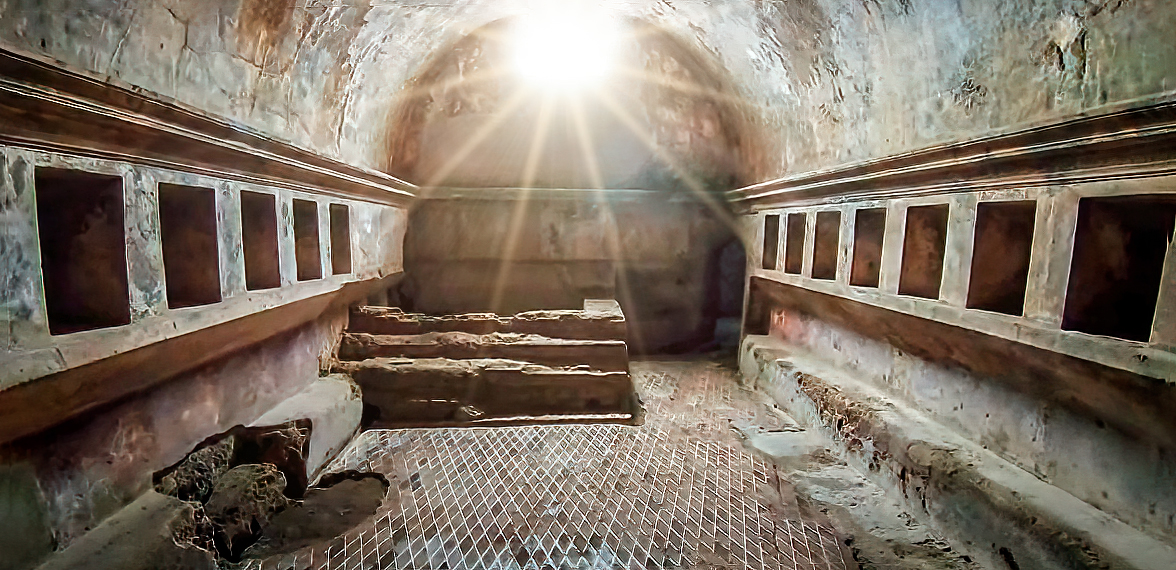
Women's apodyterium

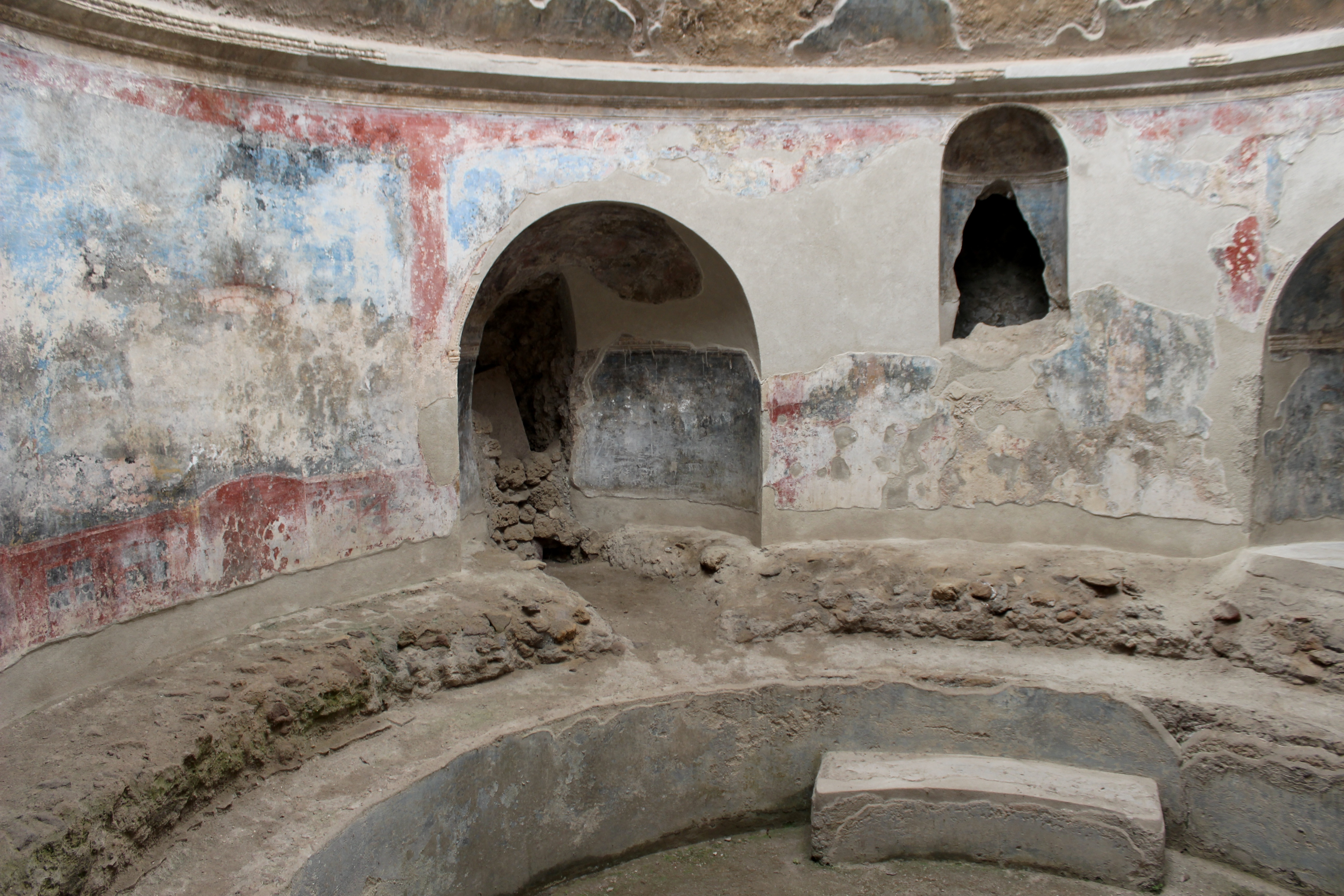
Frigidarium

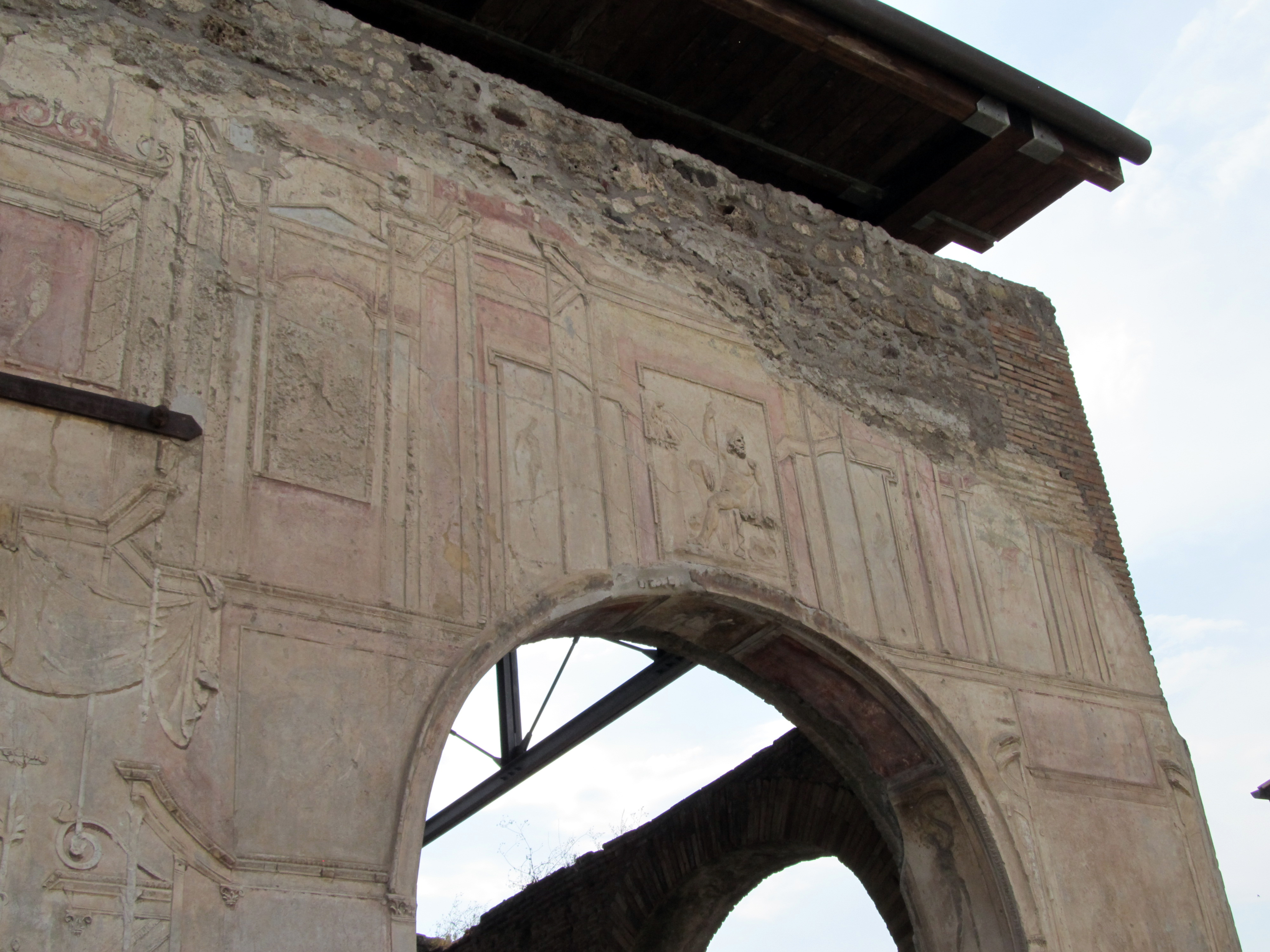
stucco wall in south-west corner of palaestra

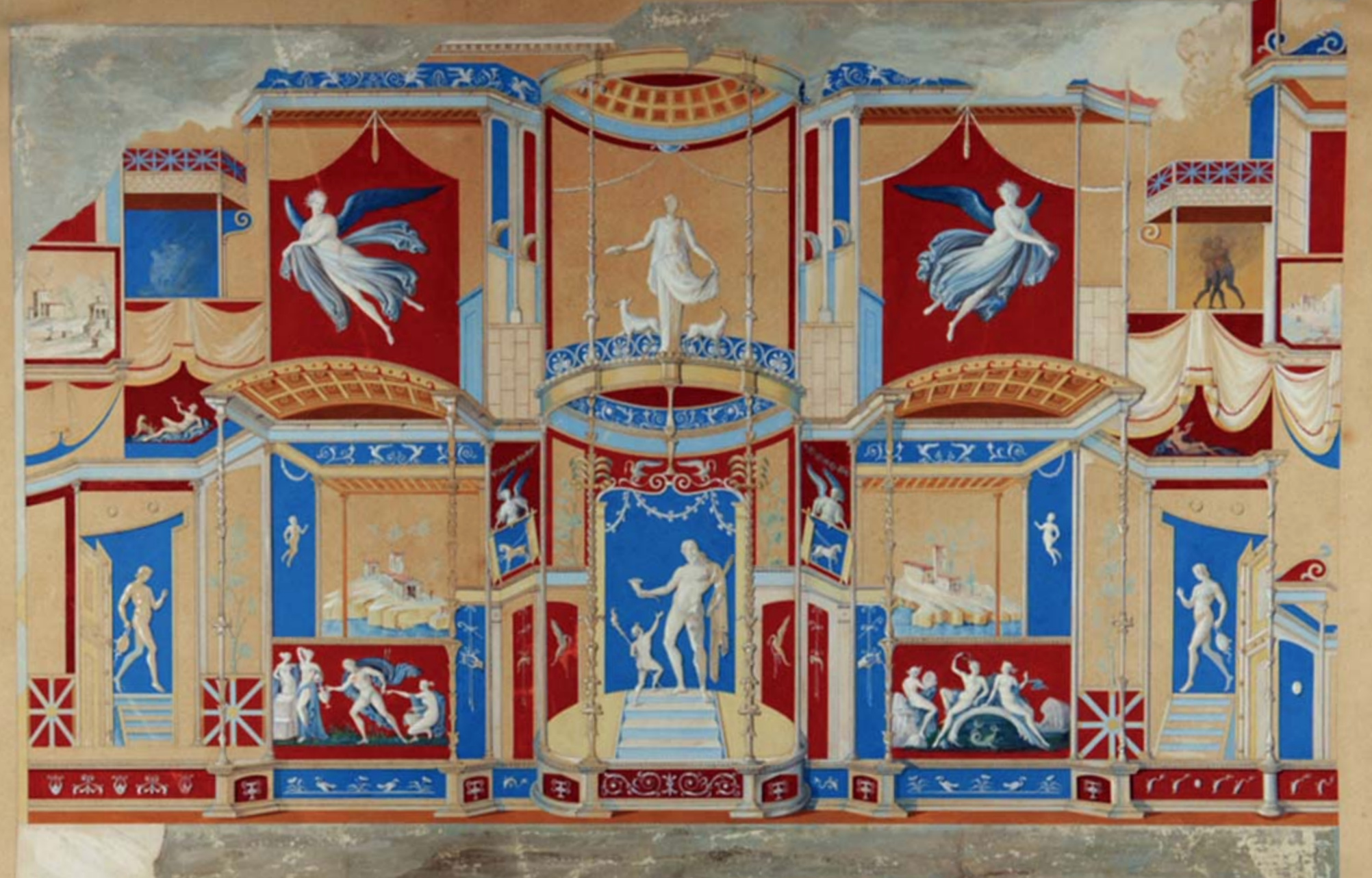
stucco wall in south-west corner of palaestra (Watercolour 1859)

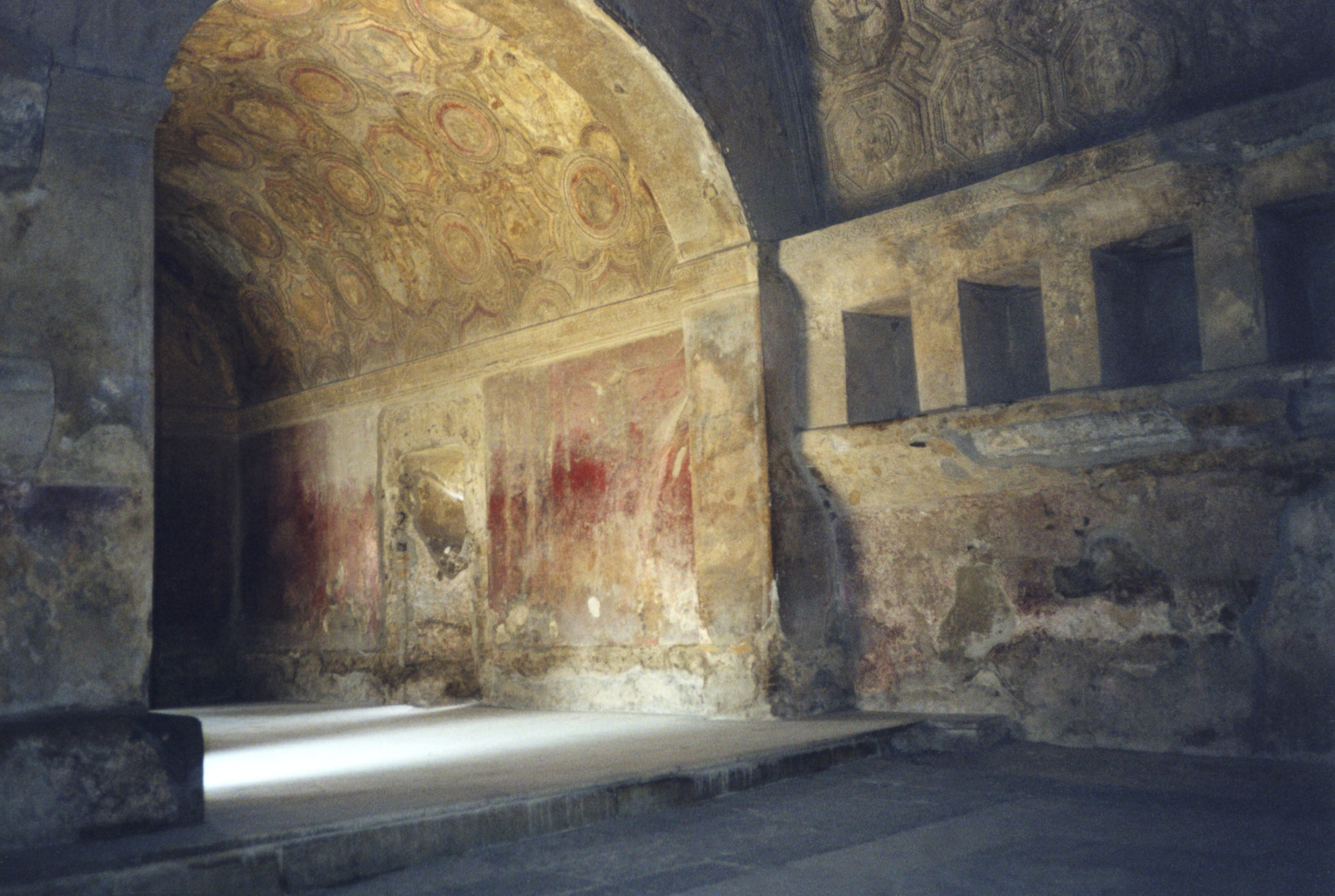
men's apodyterium

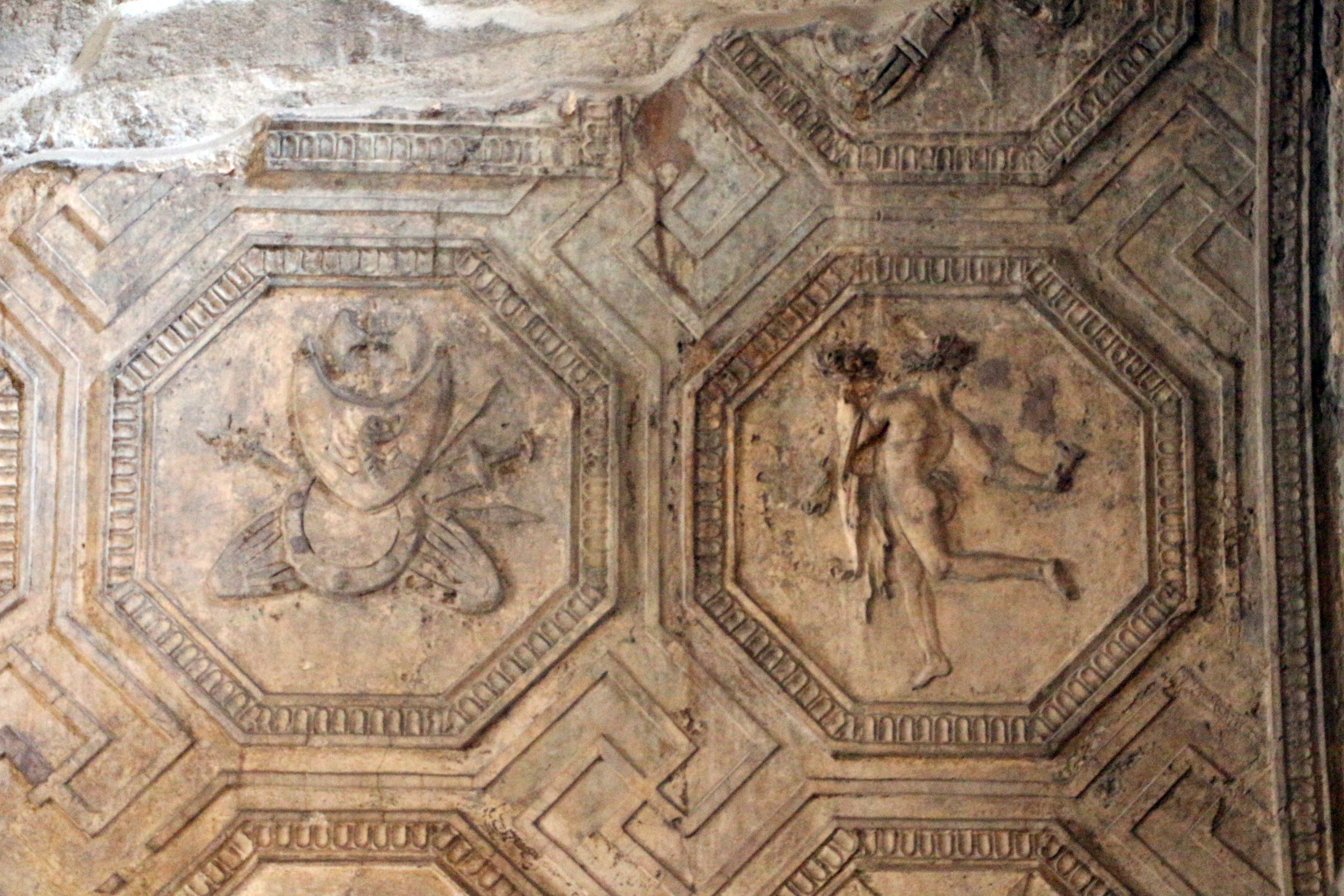
ceiling stucco, men's apodyterium

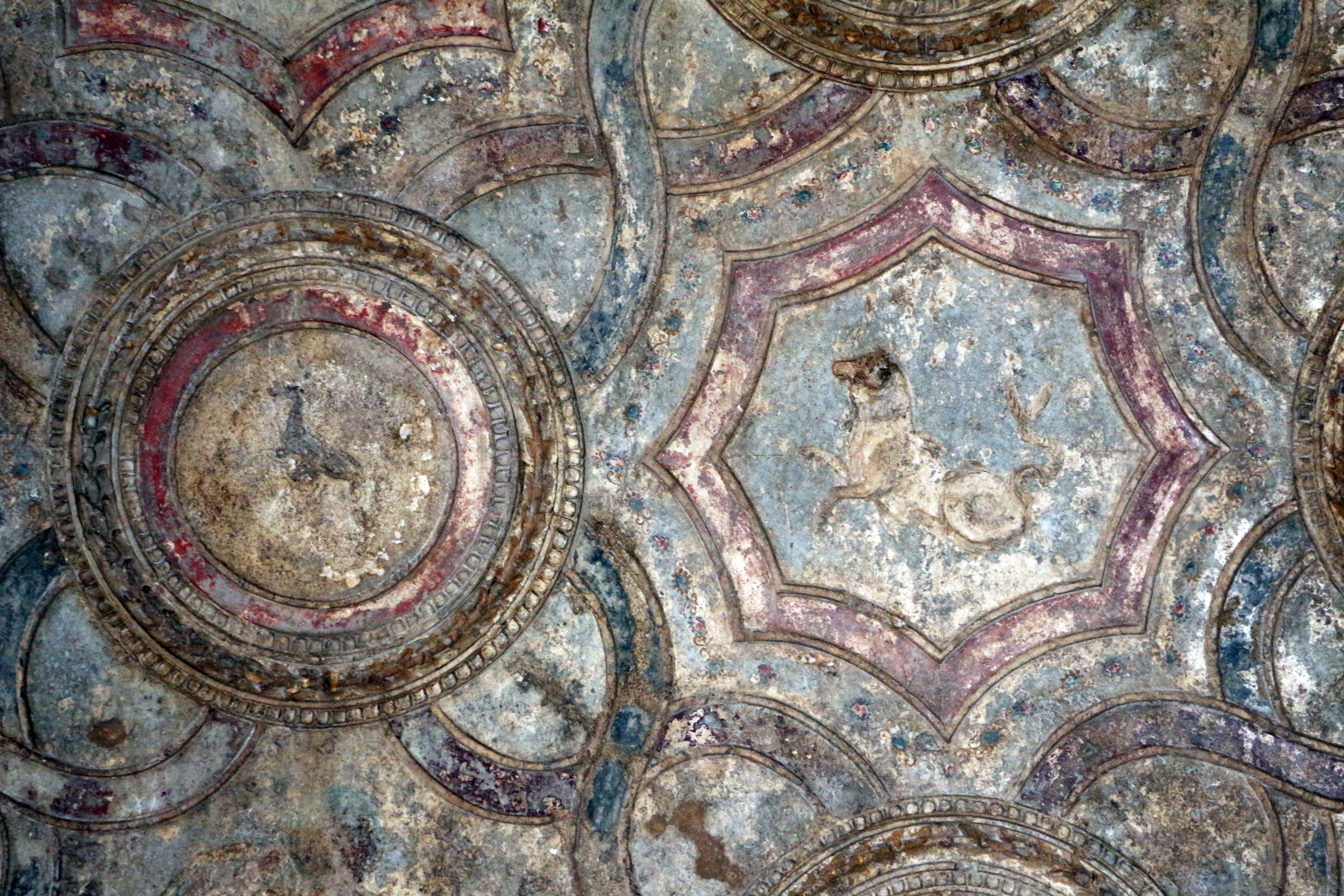
ceiling stucco, men's apodyterium

== Bibliography ==
- Beard, Mary (2008). The Fires of Vesuvius: Pompeii Lost and Found. Cambridge, Massachusetts: Belknap Press.
- de Albentiis, Emidio (2006). "Social Life: Spectacles, Athletic Games, and Baths," Pompeii. Barnes & Noble Publications.
- Koloski-Ostrow, Anna Olga (2009) "The city baths of Pompeii and Herculaneum," The World of Pompeii. Taylor & Francis; pp. 227–231.
- Fagan, Garrett G. (2002). Bathing in Public in the Roman World. University of Michigan Press.
- Mau, August & Kelsey, Francis (1902). Pompeii: Its Life and Art. Macmillan, pp 180–195.
- Sear, Frank (1982). Roman Architecture. Cornell University Press.
- Eschebach, Hans, Die Stabianer Thermen in Pompeji, De Gruyter 1979.
