= Lupanar =

Ruined brothel in Pompeii, Italy

Coordinates: 40.7503°N 14.4868°E

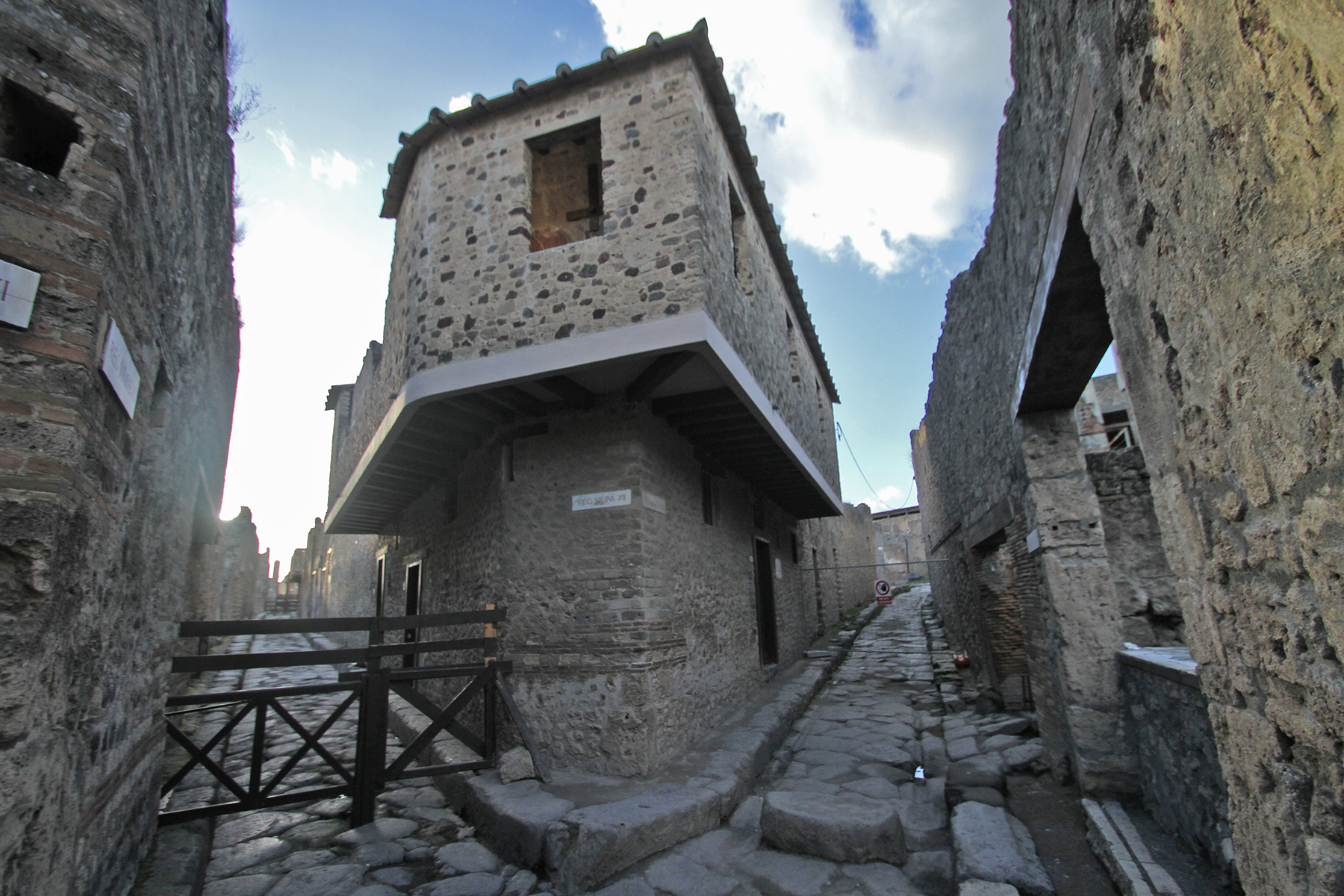
The Lupanar at VII, 12, 18–20. Vico del Lupanare is on the right. Vico del Balcone is to the left.

The Lupanar (Latin for "brothel") is the ruined building of an ancient Roman brothel in the city of Pompeii. It is of particular interest for the erotic paintings on its walls, and is also known as the Lupanare Grande or the "Purpose-Built Brothel" in the Roman colony. Pompeii was closely associated with Venus, the ancient Roman goddess of love, sex, and fertility, and therefore a mythological figure closely tied to prostitution.

== Location ==
The Lupanar (VII, 12, 18–20) is located approximately two blocks east of the forum and near the Stabian Baths at the intersection of Vico del Lupanare and Vico del Balcone Pensile.

This specific location was considered a popular social hub or a "piazza" based on graffiti that included sports tournament advertisements, political propaganda, and other more colloquial messages. Scholars have discovered there to be a great deal of foot traffic around the outside of the brothel.

== Treatment as site ==
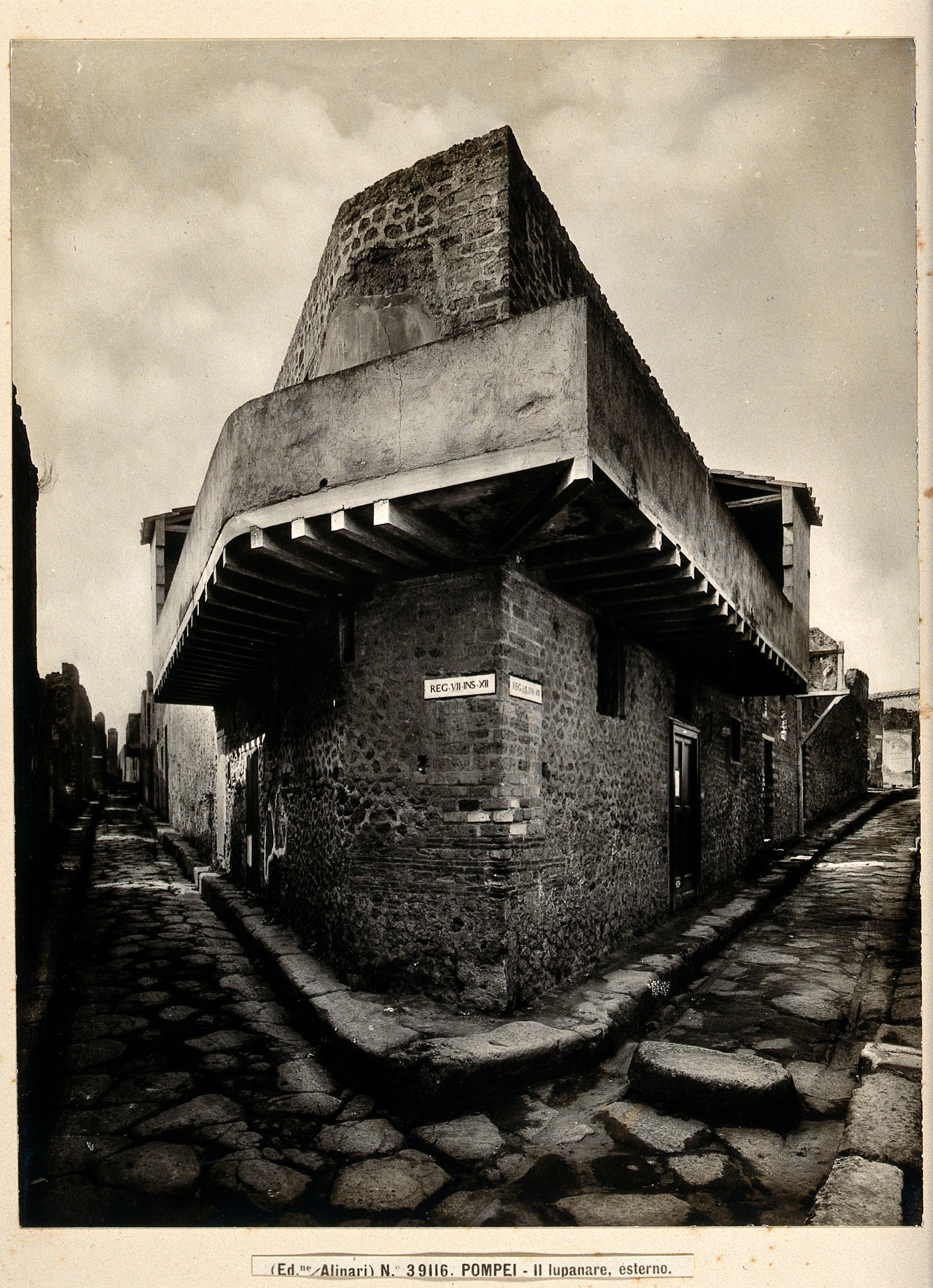
The upper floor can be seen here prior to the changes made to it.

19th century guides and historians often refused to examine or discuss the brothels due to their own moral agendas. Although historians were initially hesitant to provide insight into ancient brothels to the public, the Lupanar is now a widely visited tourist attraction within Pompeii.

Late 19th-century historian Wolfgang Helbig made the statement that "an analysis of individual paintings [from the brothel] is unnecessary and inadmissible." It was not until the 20th century that scholars began taking excavations of ancient brothels seriously. Ancient erotic art became a popular mode of study to offer insight into Greco-Roman sexuality, partnership, and power dynamics.

The reception of the brothel by patrons and visitors exemplified the class disparities within the brothel. Upper-class visitors were known to skew the representation of the brothel deriving from their own classism. Although they often described the space as filthy or unappealing, scholars have declared such recollections to be biased and untrustworthy.

== Brothels ==
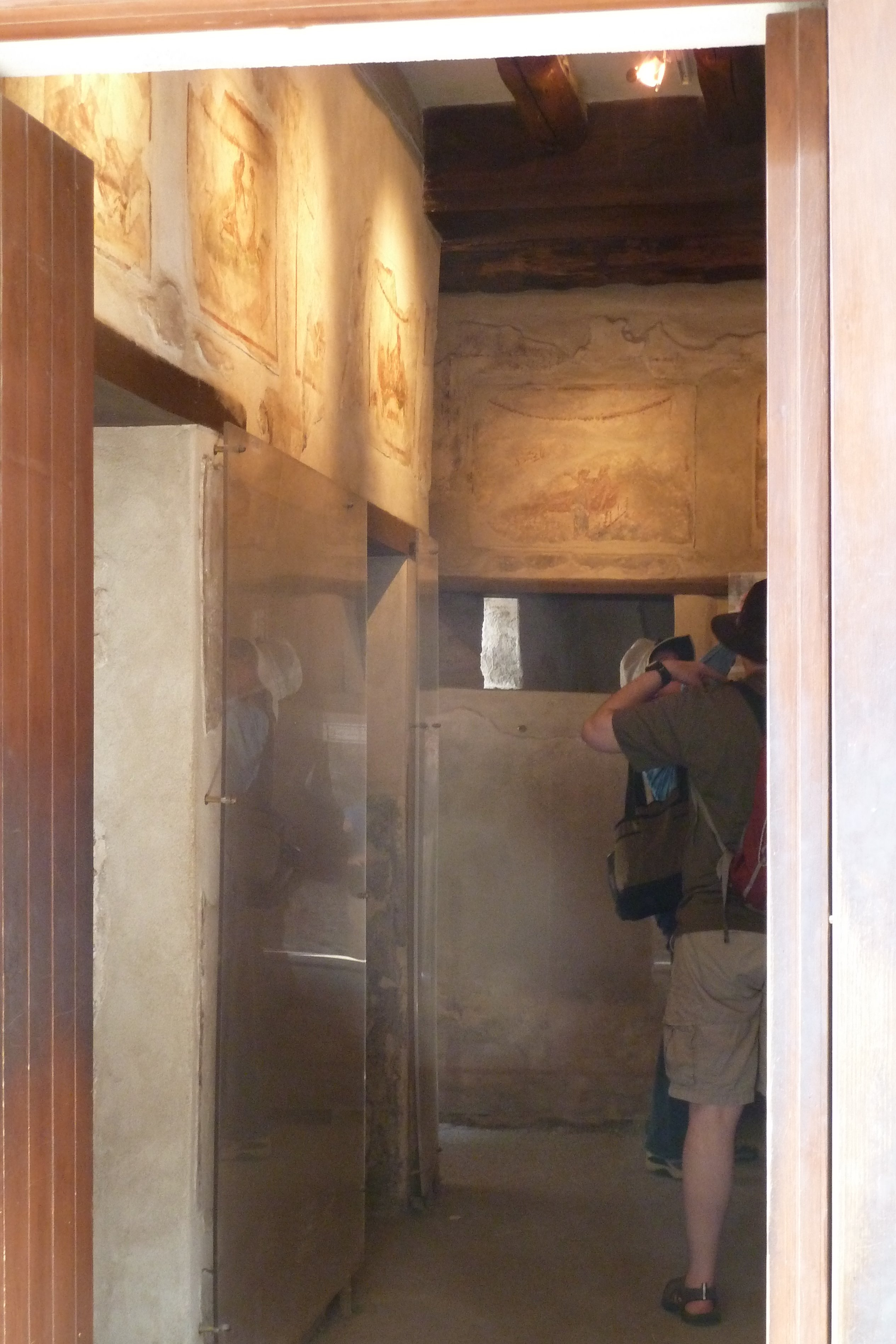
Inside the entrance to the Lupanar

The Roman word for brothel was lupanar, meaning a wolf den, and a prostitute was called a lupa ("she-wolf").

Early Pompeian excavators, guided by the strict modesty of the time period, quickly classified any building containing erotic paintings as brothels. Using this metric, Pompeii had 35 lupanares. Given a population of ten thousand in Pompeii during the first century CE, this leaves one brothel per 286 people or 71 adult males. Using stricter and more thorough criteria for identifying brothels brings the number to a more realistic figure of nine single-room establishments and the Lupanar at VII, 12, 18–20.

Brothels during this period were typically small with only a few rooms. Prostitutes worked out of small, individual rooms. There were no doors or indications of curtain rods for privacy, with only a small barred window high up on the wall for light. The prostitute's individual price was often listed next to the door, as determined by their pimps. The Lupanar was the largest of the brothels found in Pompeii with 10 rooms. Like other brothels, rooms in the Lupanar were plainly furnished. A mattress on a brick platform served as a bed.

== Graffiti ==
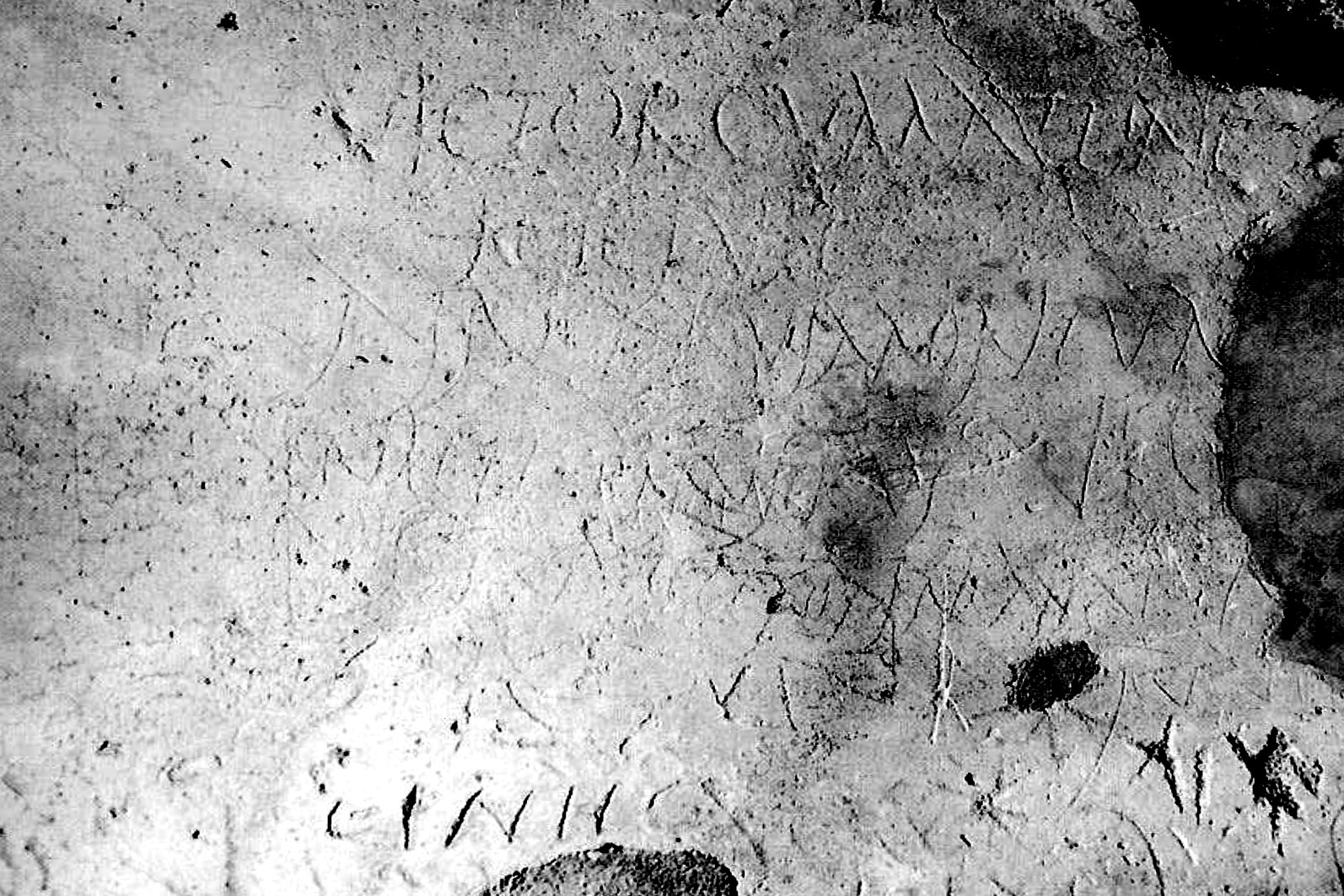
Graffiti inside the Lupanar

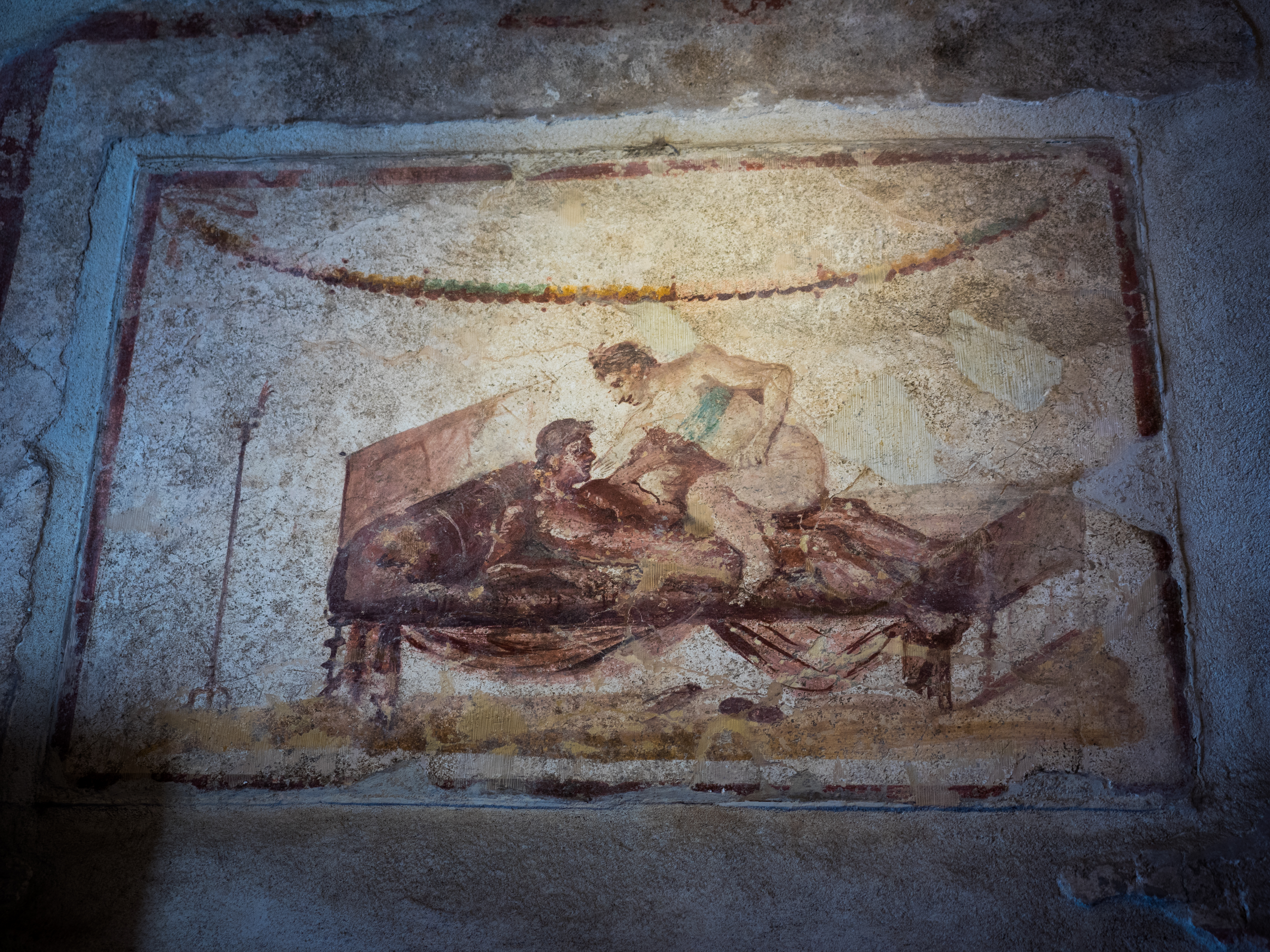
Sexual scene from a wall painting at the Lupanar; the woman wears the ancient equivalent of a bra. Painting dated to 72 - 79 CE

There have been over 150 graffiti transcribed from the Lupanar at Pompeii. The presence of this graffiti served as one of the criteria for identifying the building as a brothel. On the roads leading to the Lupanar, phalluses were engraved on the basalt roads to indicate where to find the brothel. Most citizens of Pompeii partook in wall writing as a way of messaging, advertising, gossiping, and spreading important information. Women, children, laborers, and slaves were known to participate in graffiti.

The graffiti within the brothel included both texts and images as well as death notices, poems, etchings, greetings, and compliments.

The Lupanar's graffiti was considered a multi-sensory experience. Because much of the Pompeii population was not completely literate, graffiti was an intentionally interactive experience for all visitors. Patrons and workers were able to not only read the wall text but also speak it aloud, hear it from others, and even physically touch the engravings. Limited spelling and poor grammar and syntax provided insight into the spectrum of literacy amongst the Pompeiian population.

Examples of graffiti from the Lupanar include:

- Hic ego puellas multas futui ("Here I fucked many girls").
- Felix bene futuis ("Lucky guy, you fuck well", a prostitute's blandishment to her client, or "Lucky guy, you get a good fuck").
- Sabinus Proclo | salutem ("Sabinus greeting to Proclus").
- Ias Magno salute ("IAS welcomes/greets Magnus").
- Africanus moritur | scribet (!) puer Rusticus | condisce(n?)s cui dolet pro Africano ("Africanus dies. The boy Rusticus writes this. As you learn of this, who is in agony over Africanus?").
- Μόλα · φουτοῦτρις ("Mola is a fucktress")

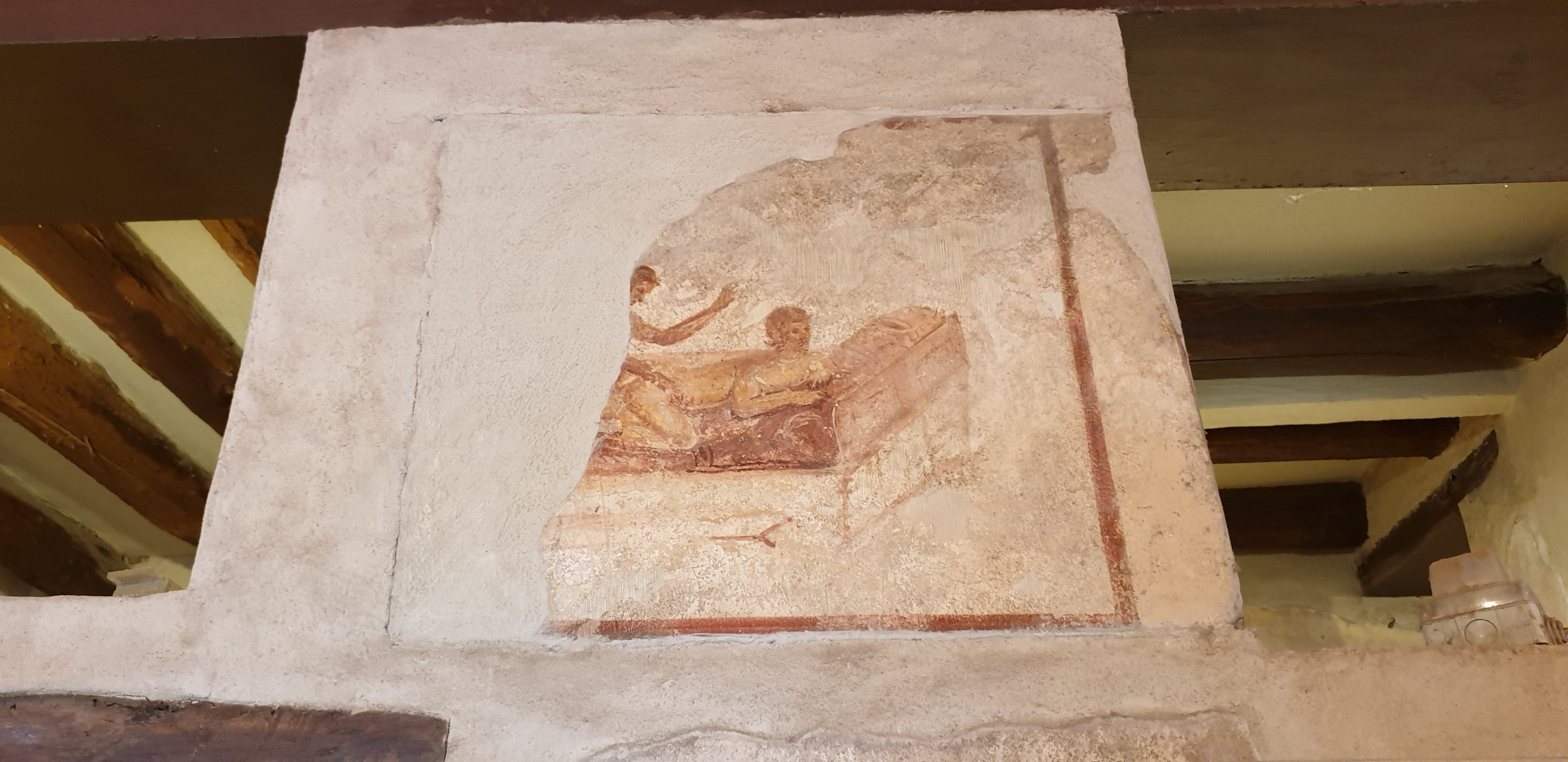
Wall painting in the Lupanar. 72 - 79 CE

Other examples can be traced to other locations in Pompeii. Persons of wealth generally did not visit brothels because of the availability of mistresses or slave concubines. The graffiti do tell stories, however. Various authors respond to each other's carvings in a sort of dialogue. Classical scholar Sarah Levin-Richardson argues that the graffiti are more than just records of sexual liaisons or advertisements of the services of prostitutes; they illustrate an inter-active discourse regarding masculinity.

The brothel's graffiti provided insight into the demographic as well as the languages spoken within the brothel. Text could be found in Greek, Latin, and the native Oscan language.

Because of the Romans' use of nomenclature, we can tell who was freed or a slave based on the names graffitied on the walls.

Although most of the literate population of Pompeii was male, there are records indicating female literacy. Many scholars of Ancient Rome have attributed such wall writings including bar advertisements, love letters, greetings, insults, and even financial records to female writers.

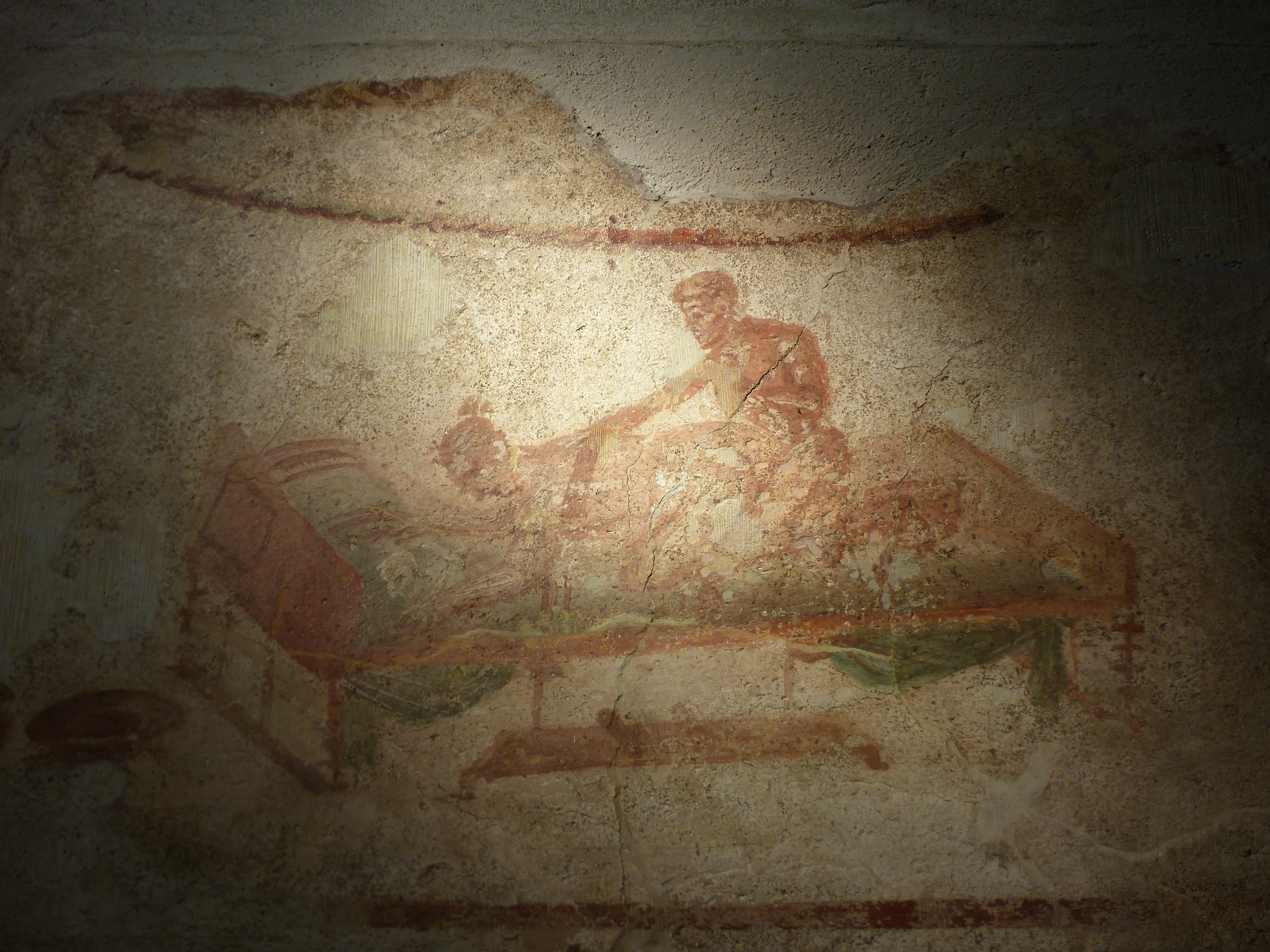
Wall painting inside the Lupanar. 72 - 79 CE

The written evidence of fellatio offers insight into the varying perspectives of female prostitutes and male clients. There is wall text that reads, Fortunata fellat ("Fortunata sucks"). Scholars speculate that this graffiti was likely written by a woman as she describes the active position of sucking. This is an important distinction from the word irrumare, which translates to "to mouth-fuck." This verb would have been used by male clients to express the activity of being fellated. The use of active verb forms in some of the graffiti may indicate that the authors ascribed erotic agency to the women being described; as active doers, rather than mere receivers.

The uneven distribution of graffiti offers insight into the popularity of specific rooms. Most graffiti can be found closest to the entrance which indicates that these rooms were the most often used or even preferred by clients.

== Erotic frescoes ==
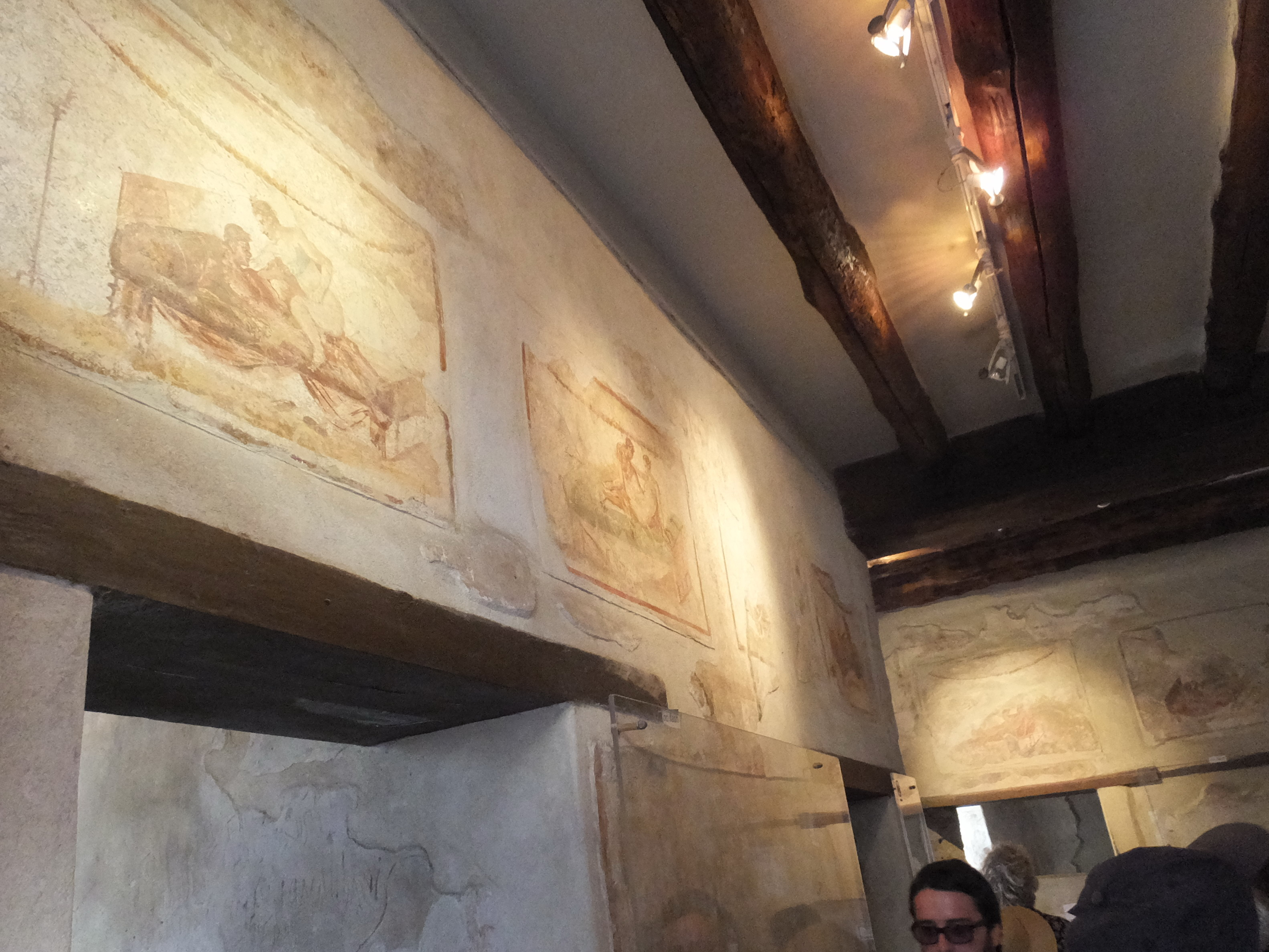
Erotic wall paintings inside the Lupanar

The most well-known feature of the brothel are the erotic frescoes that are found lining the hallways above the door lintels. There are eight notable frescoes in total, although only seven are still in surviving condition. Of the frescoes still intact, five of them depict different sex positions between a male and female. Frescoes illustrate the positions of woman on top, missionary position, doggy style, 69 position and anal sex. The sixth fresco shows a seated male accompanied by a standing woman; the male gestures towards what scholars believe to be a smaller sex image. The seventh fresco features a prominent deity, Priapus, a male god of fertility known for his permanent and pronounced erection, surrounded by two stylized erections. The eighth fresco is in extremely poor condition but is believed to depict yet another sexual engagement.

The frescoes were originally discovered during an excavation in 1862. They can be dated back to 72 CE. This is because there is an impression of a coin within the walls' plaster that can be traced back to this date.

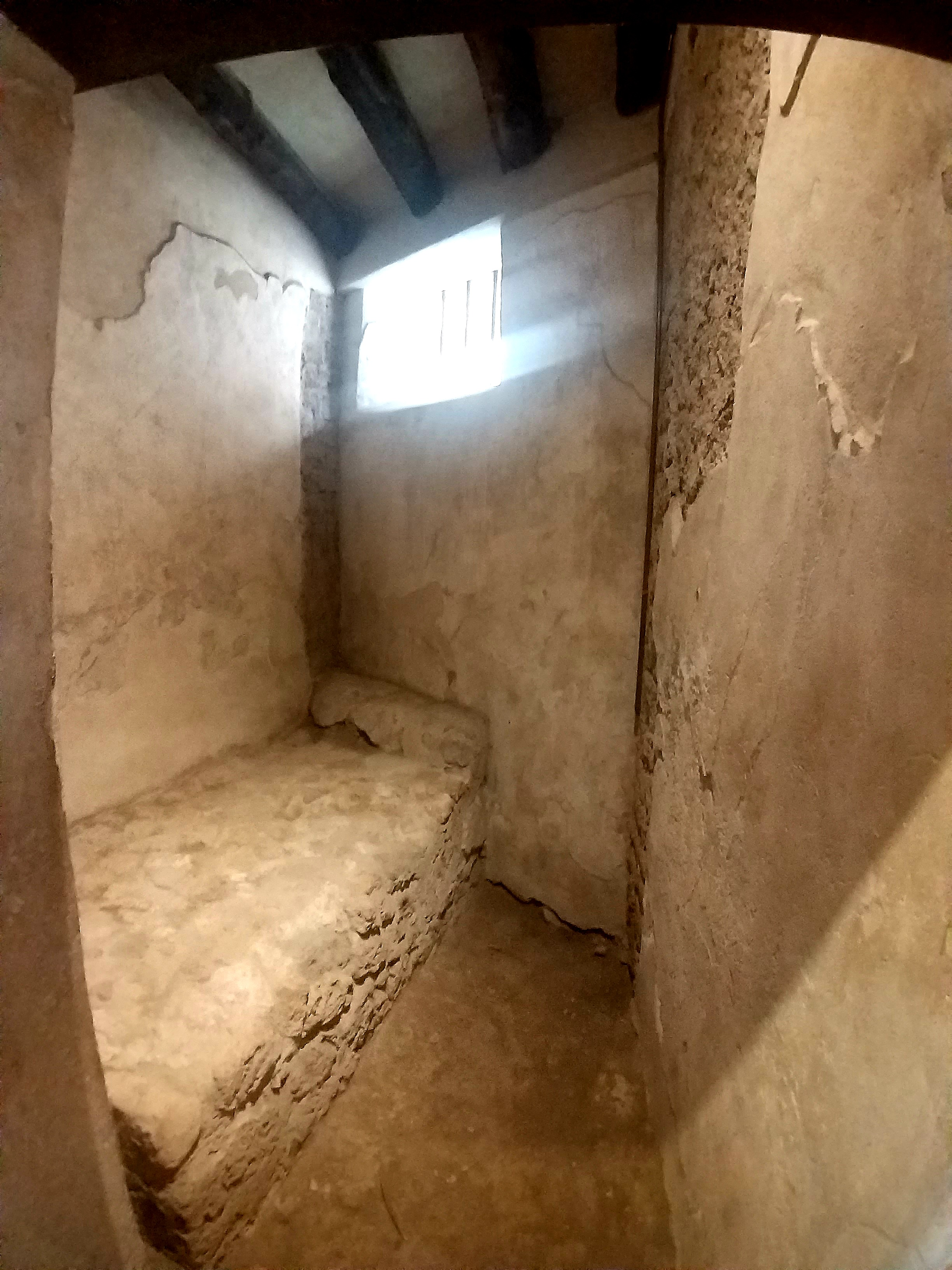
A room inside the lupanar. The bed is thought to have had mattresses on top of it.

The frescoes were intentionally placed above eye level to establish symbolic distance between the viewer (the client) and the sexual journey they were to embark on. The arrangement of the frescoes lead outwards from doorway 18. Frescoes also helped create a sense of luxury, as they depicted large rooms with fancy bedding and wealth, customers could look at these pictures and imagine that they were having a similar lavish experience.

Other non-sexual images can be found along the brothel walls including depictions of animals and other decorative patterning. Red paint was most often used to depict such images as proven by its subtle remnants.

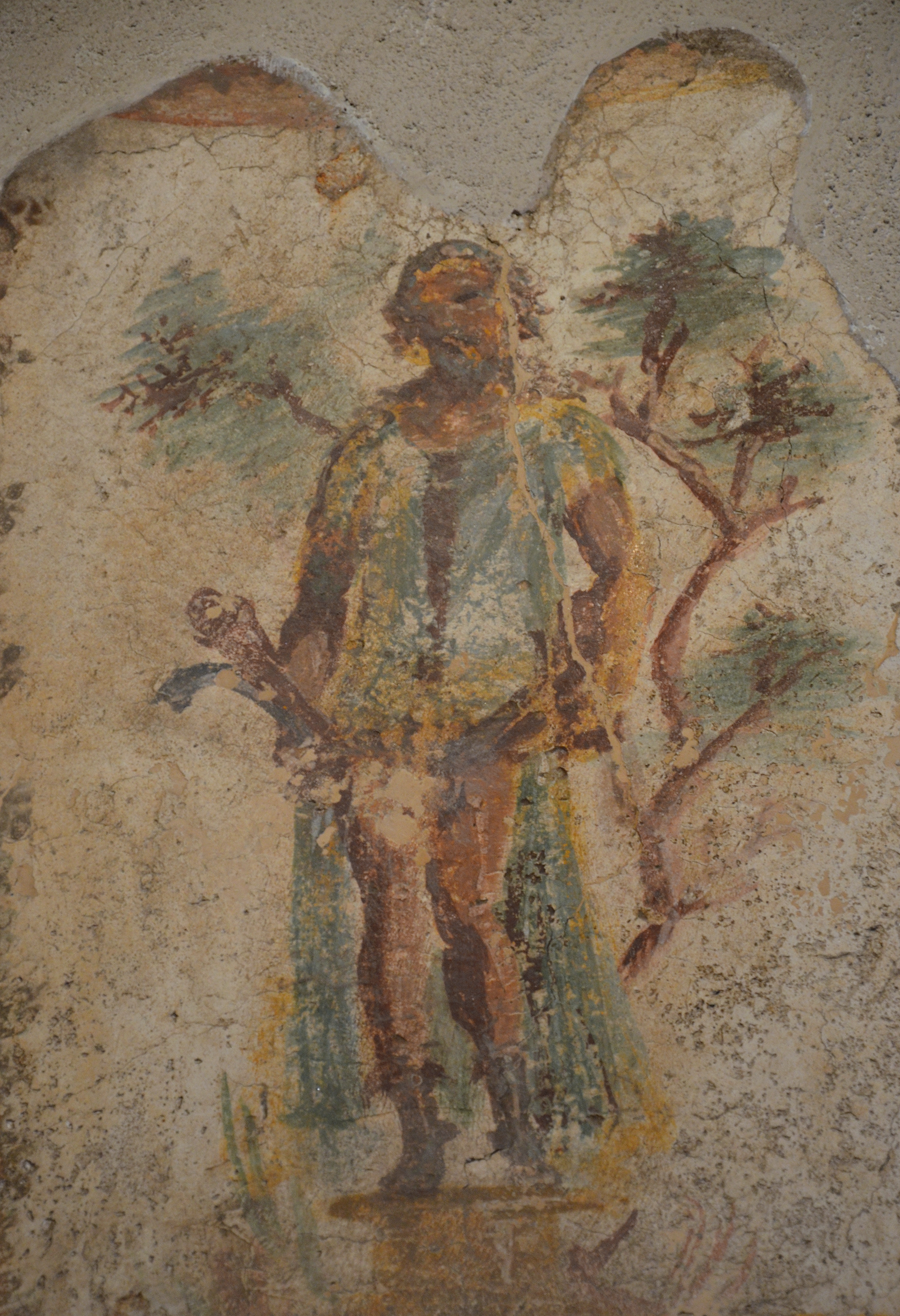
Wall painting of Priapus with two phalluses in the Lupanar.72 - 79 CE

Although a wide range of sex acts including oral and homoerotic engagements were shown in graffiti and other artworks across Pompeii, the Lupanar's frescoes solely depict heteronormative intercourse between a male and female party. The Lupanar's frescoes were specifically curated to suggest a purified and idealistic sexual environment to prospective clients. Penetration of the male, oral sex given to a female, and a reversal of traditional gender roles in intercourse were taboo within the Roman society and therefore, often hidden from public view. Many of the erotic frescoes were censored despite depicting blatant sex acts. In the fresco closest to the brothel's entrance, the artist has carefully concealed the female breast as well as the genitalia. Breast bands were often depicted in such works in order to suggest modesty. A female figure's breasts are visible in the fresco found on the southern side of the hallway. The penetration, however, is still discreetly covered.

While the erotic frescoes often did not depict the real sex acts that took place within the brothel, they were supplemental to advertisements for specific prostitutes and activities. Visitors would often look to the frescoes for inspiration before choosing their prostitute and/or service.

== Female prostitutes ==
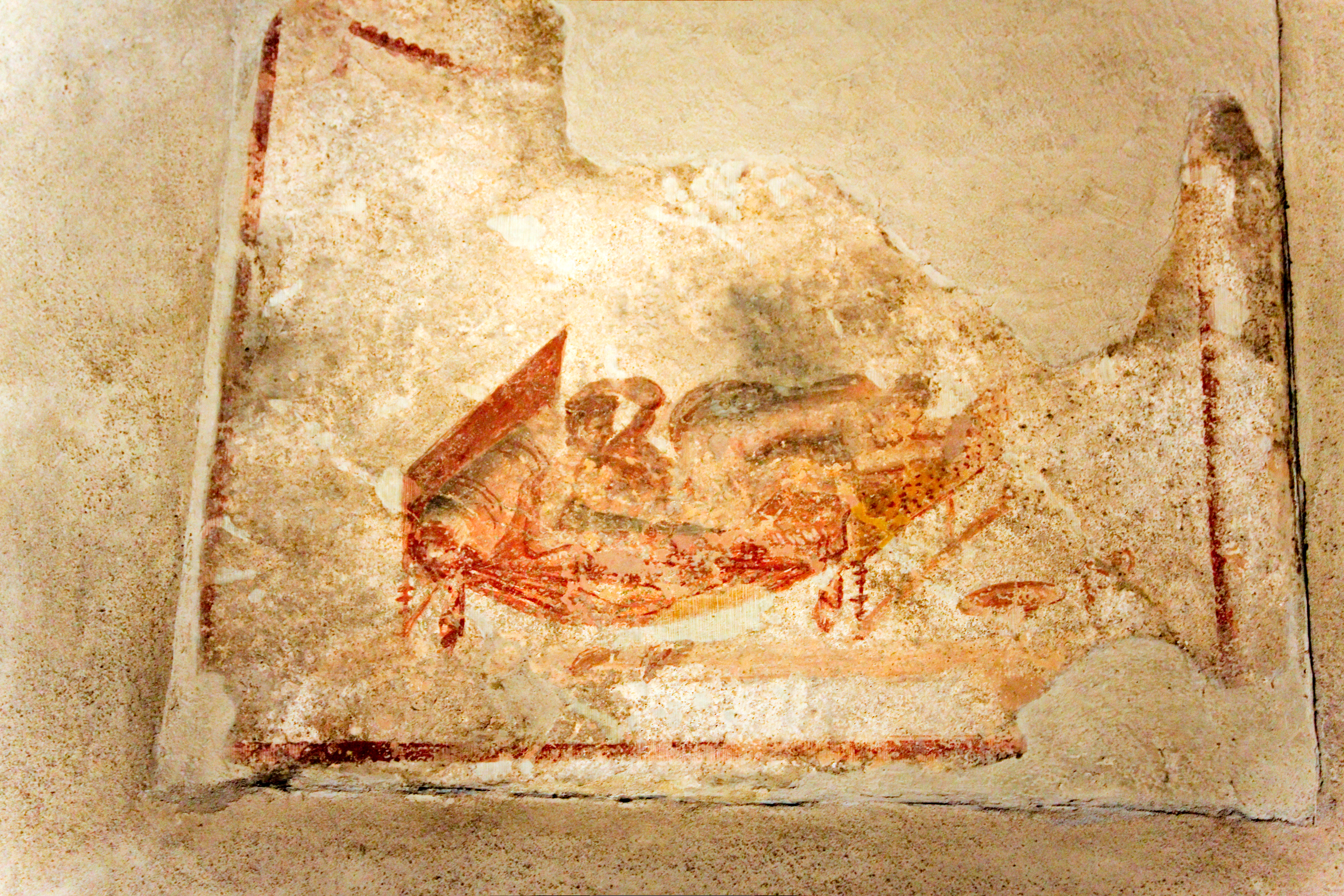
Wall painting from the Lupanar.72 - 79 CE

Female prostitutes were frequently described as characters in Roman literature; however, first-hand accounts of real prostitutes are far more rare. The owner of these prostitutes was called a Leno. The Leno would buy girls (usually from the East) for prices around 600 sesterces to be their slaves. Other prostitutes were forced into work at the brothel as a result of financial crisis and family run institutions. It was quite rare for a prostitute to make enough money to escape working at the brothel.

The life of a prostitute in Pompeii was a challenging one. Whether they were enslaved or merely too poor to deny work, prostitutes hardly ever refused a client. It was not uncommon for prostitutes to be robbed, beaten, raped, and even killed while working at the brothel. The women inside the brothel faced such abuse by both clients and managers. Because so many prostitutes were slaves, they were often subject to sexual and physical violence. Clients were often possessive and jealous towards their preferred prostitutes and retaliated by threatening and beating them.

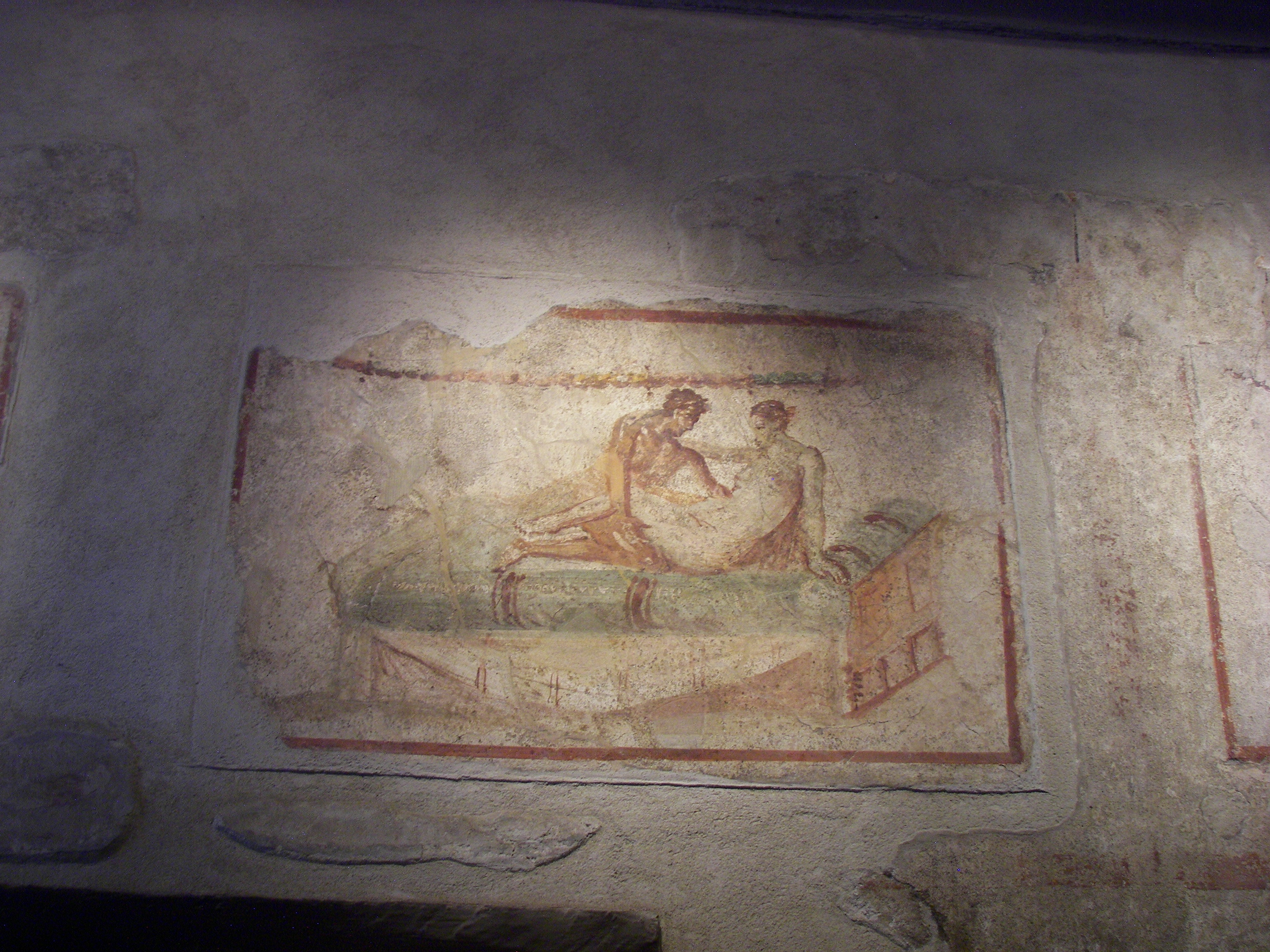
Wall painting from the Lupanar.72 - 79 CE

One of the most infamous examples of sex worker abuse in Ancient Rome, more specifically northern Africa, involved an enslaved woman named Adultera who was forced to wear a lead collar. The collar featured an inscription that read, "Adultera [is my name], I am a prostitute. Restrain [me] because I have fled from Bulla Regia." Historians have noted that a blacksmith would have hammered the collar shut whilst around her neck. The collar was found still wrapped around the neck of her skeleton.

Prostitutes were not only responsible for physical labor but also emotional labor. The prostitutes of lupanar were expected to offer kindness and support to clients beyond physical affection and sexual favors. Prostitutes were noted to heal wounds and build the self esteems of upset visitors. Sometimes, clients and prostitutes did have long-term relationships as shown in legal texts.

Prostitutes were expected to assist in the maintenance of the brothel. They were also encouraged to engage in conversation with clients and write messages to them on the walls.

Some clients were recorded to frequent the brothel often and enjoyed written statements of their visits. A client by the name of Sollemnis was mentioned twice in the brothel's wall graffiti. One of the texts read, "Sollemnis, you fuck well." It is unclear if the prostitutes wrote this themselves considering literacy was mostly common amongst male populations; however, it is possible that they knew how to express such ideas in text.

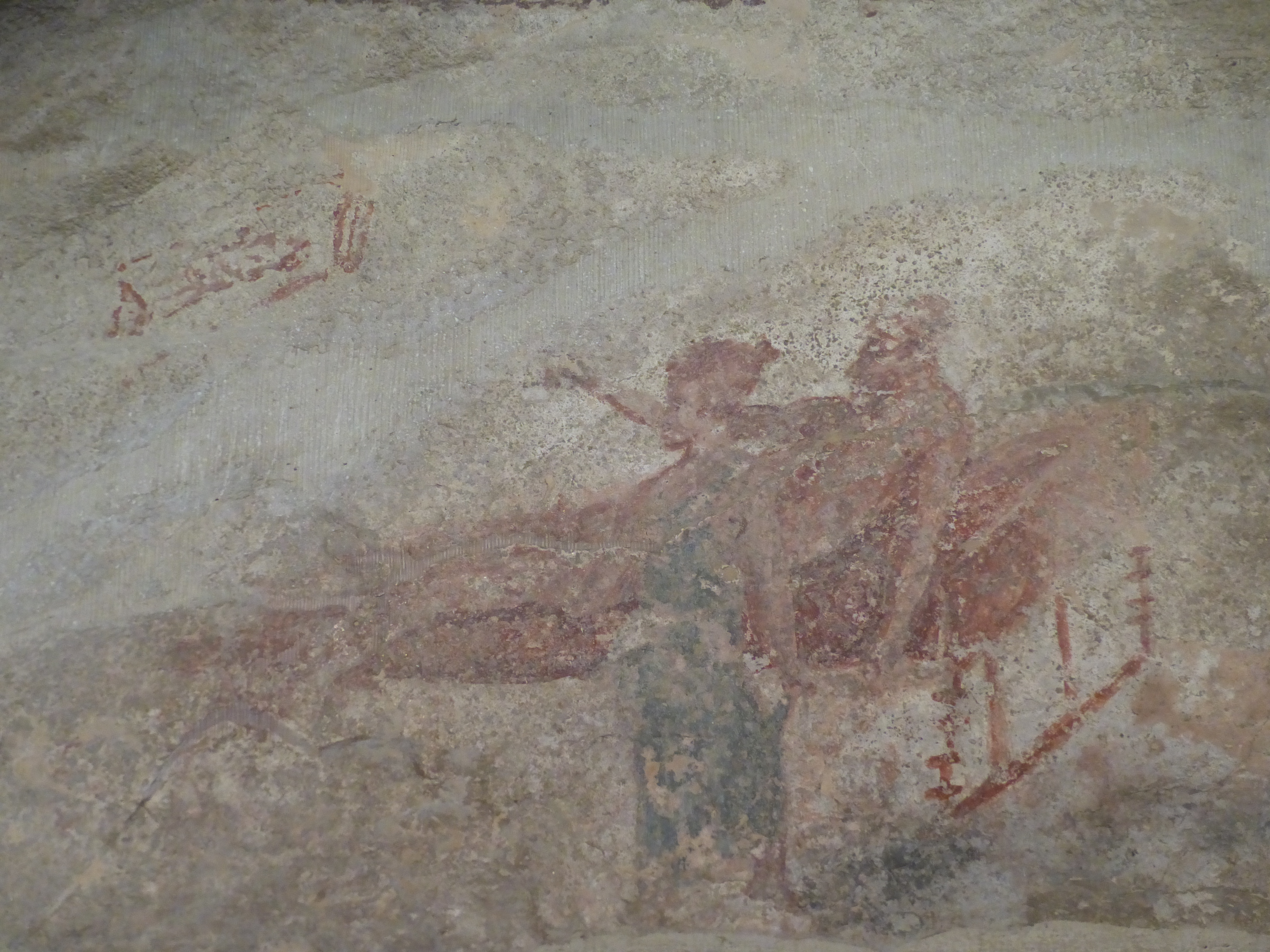
Wall painting from the Lupanar. 72 - 79 CE

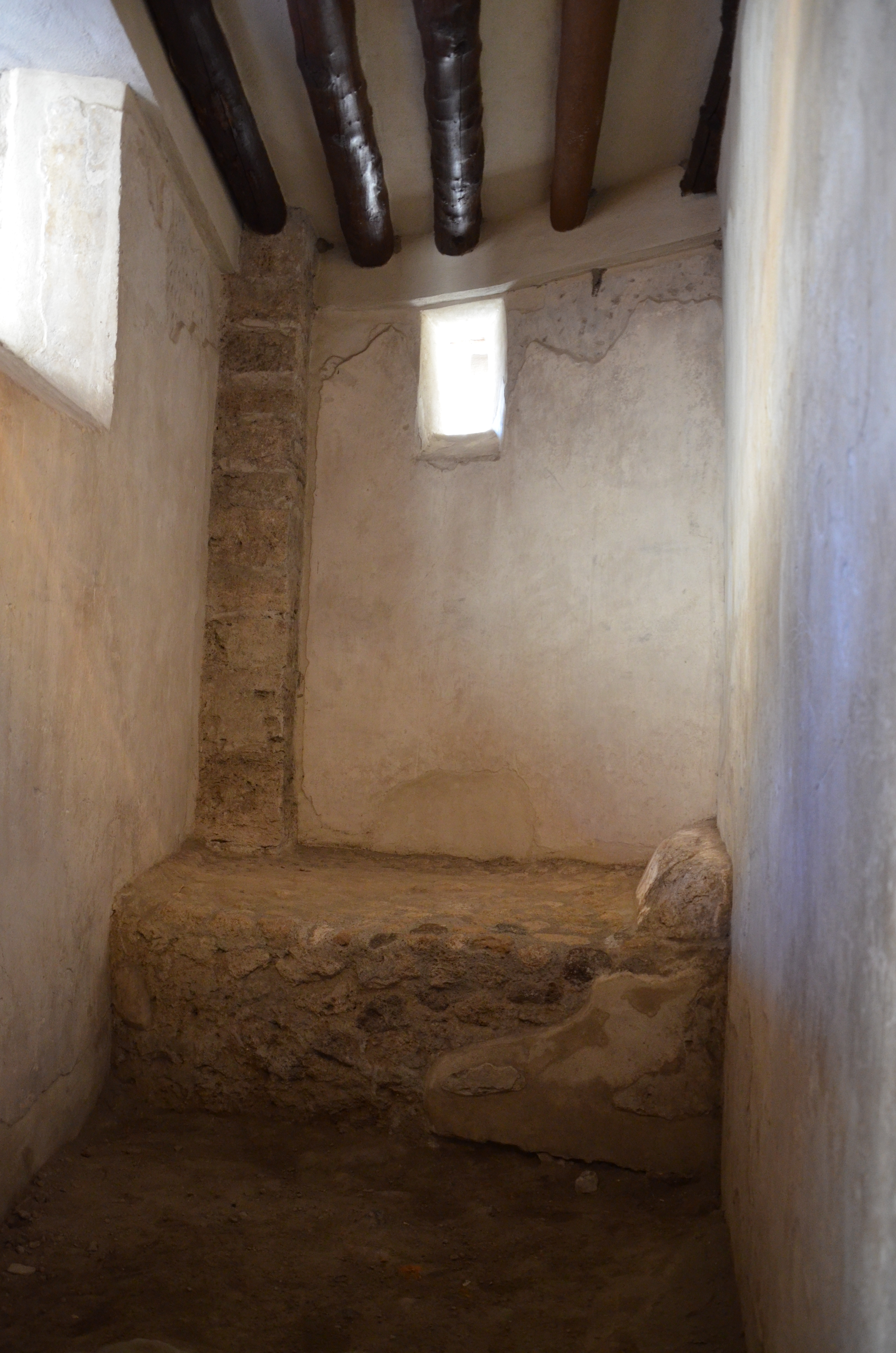
Stone bed in the lupanar

Although there was a stigma surrounding sex work in Ancient Pompeii, prostitutes were not hidden from public view. They often interacted outside of the brothel when retrieving water or partaking in other appointed tasks. In their brief moments outside of the Lupanar, the prostitutes were able to spend what little money they made on food, items, and drinks. Because the local fountains and the Lupanar itself was near the popular piazza, prostitutes were granted precious moments of freedom in which they socialized and interacted with the public. Yet as author Sarah Levin-Richardson explains, prostitution was just one aspect of a more extensive system of sexual exploitation of slaves,

Much of this exploitation took place within the context of an individual household and not in the context of sex for sale: specifically, all enslaved individuals were thought to be fair game for the sexual attention of the free members of the household, and some individuals were purchased specifically as sex slaves, and sometimes at very young ages.

The rampant misogyny of Ancient Rome was greatly detrimental to all lower-class women, as exemplified in their nicknames as "she-wolves." Upper-class Roman men would willfully identify any lower-class woman as a prostitute, especially if she worked outside of the home or alongside men who were not direct family members.

== Business operation ==
The Lupanar of Pompeii was not exclusively a place for prostitution but also a place of leisure for local men. Although upper-class individuals were given elevated treatment within the brothels, laborers and slaves alike were known to frequent the institution for relaxation, socializing, and sexual gratification.

The brothel was a highly profitable business model that involved a specialized investment system that went through groups of pimps and the leasing of slave women. Pimps often determined prices, especially if the prostitute was a slave. Even an inexpensive prostitute made two or three times as much as an unskilled male laborer, making lupanars profitable for masters, pimps, and landlords.

Much of the brothel's profits were made in activities beyond sex acts. The Lupanar also acted as a bar as prostitutes would make and sell drinks to visitors and clients. It has also been noted that the prostitutes themselves were known to drink in order to withstand the violence they so often faced.

Prostitutes were also recorded to have offered bodily and personal care to clients. Remaining bronze, wide-brimmed vessels were found in the remains of the brothel. Such vessels were most typically found alongside personal care items or toiletries which led scholars to believe these vessels were likely used for bathing and cleaning clients.

Another evidence of bodily care practices was the raschiatoio or "scrapers" found near the water basins. This also led scholars to believe that prostitutes would shave the facial and body hair of clients while inside the brothel. Such findings allowed scholars and historians to better understand the use of water within the brothel and why it was lucrative that prostitutes consistently go to the nearby fountains in order to refill and empty the water vessels.

== Nearby fountains ==
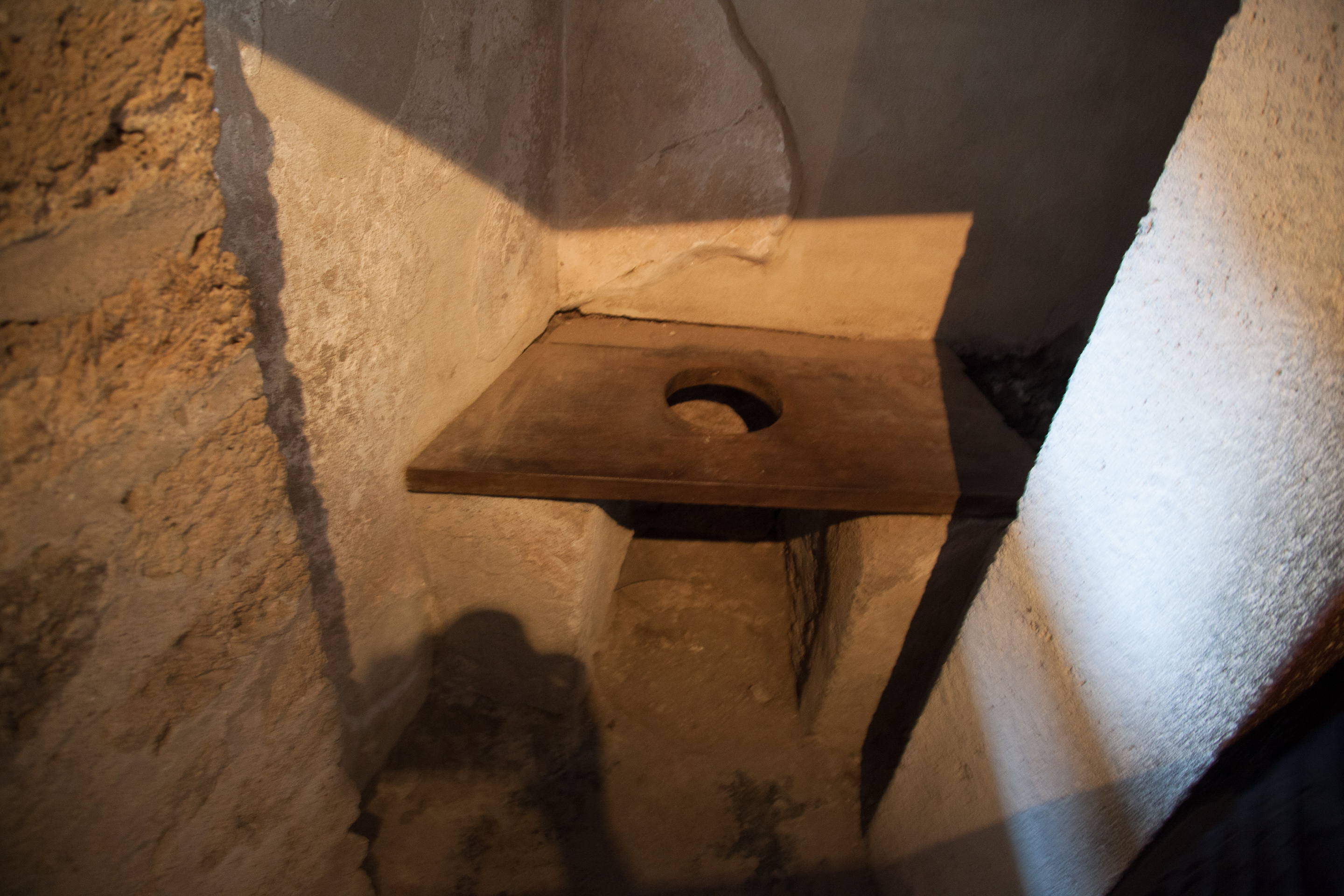
A latrine in the Lupanar

Because the brothel did not have its own water supply, water had to be carried from communal fountains nearby. One fountain, to the South of brothel, was located near the cross section between Vicolo del Lupanare and Via dell'Abbondanza. Another fountain could be found at the intersection of Via Stabiana and Via della Fortuna. A third fountain was located to the west of the Lupanar, at the intersection of Vicolo della Maschera and Vicolo del Balcone Pensile.

Prostitutes were expected to fetch water to bring back to the brothel for cleanings, shavings, and other bodily care practices. Although their primary position was to fulfill the client's sexual appetite, they were also responsible for maintaining the brothel's cleanliness and order. After use, the prostitutes would dispose of the used water in the streets or alleyways.

== See also ==
- Erotic art in Pompeii and Herculaneum
- Homosexuality in Ancient Rome
- Prostitution in ancient Rome
- Roman graffiti
- Sexuality in Ancient Rome
