= Labrum (architecture) =

In architecture was a large water-filled vessel or basin with an overhanging lip

The labrum in architecture was a large water-filled vessel or basin with an overhanging lip. Marble or granite labrums were a common feature of Roman thermae.

== Examples ==
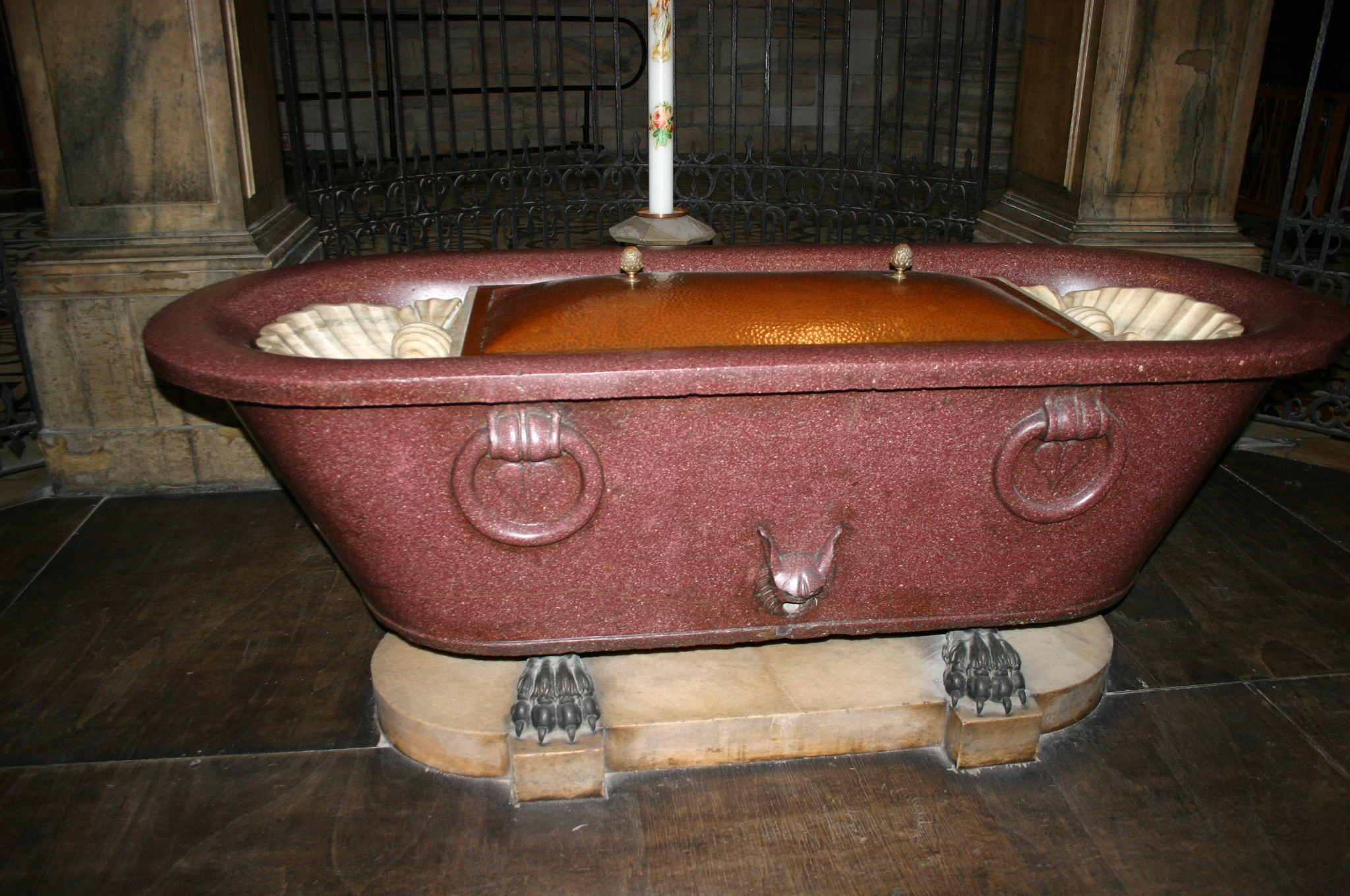
Labrum in Milan

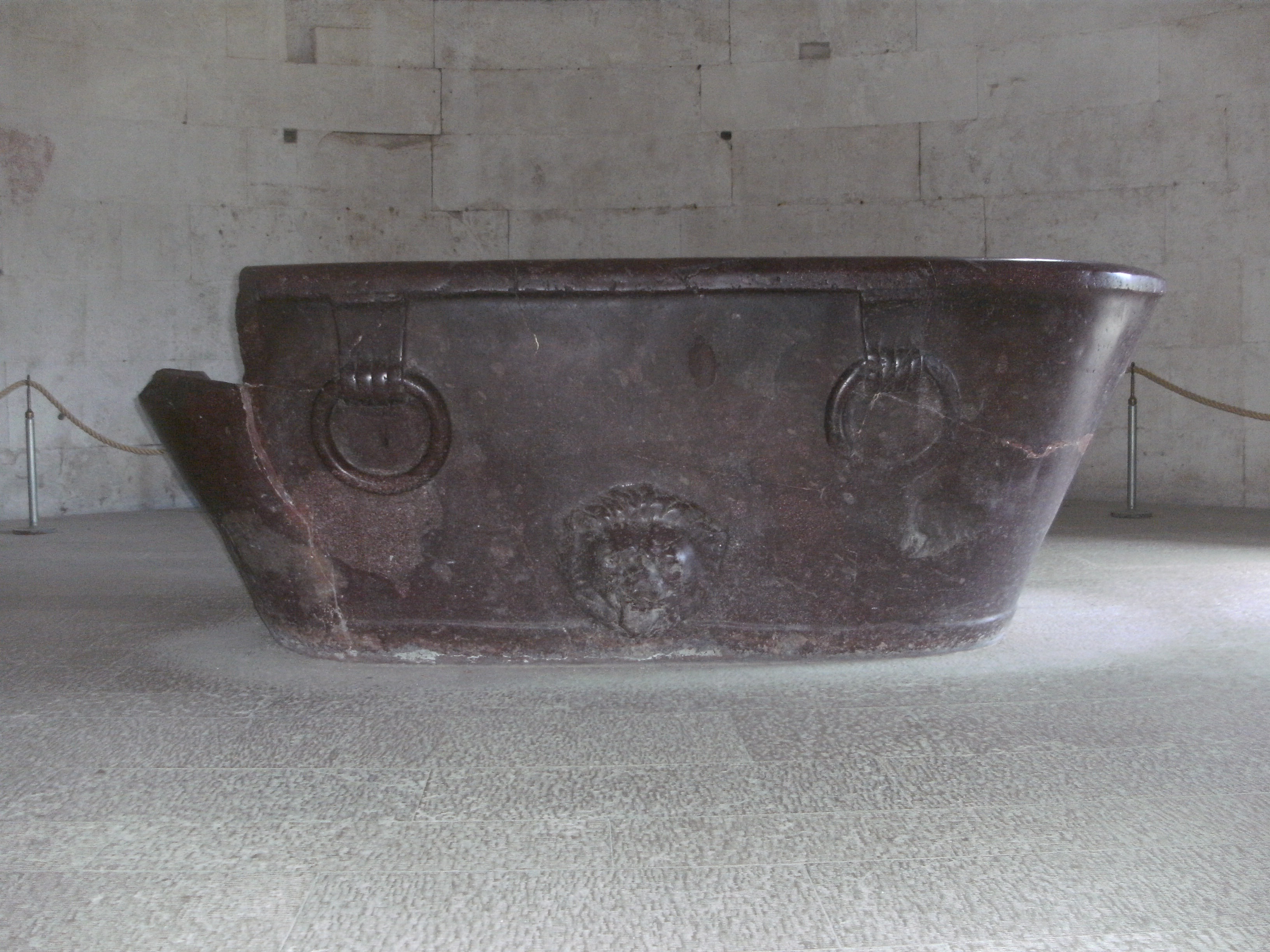
Labrum in Mausoleum of Theodoric in Ravenna

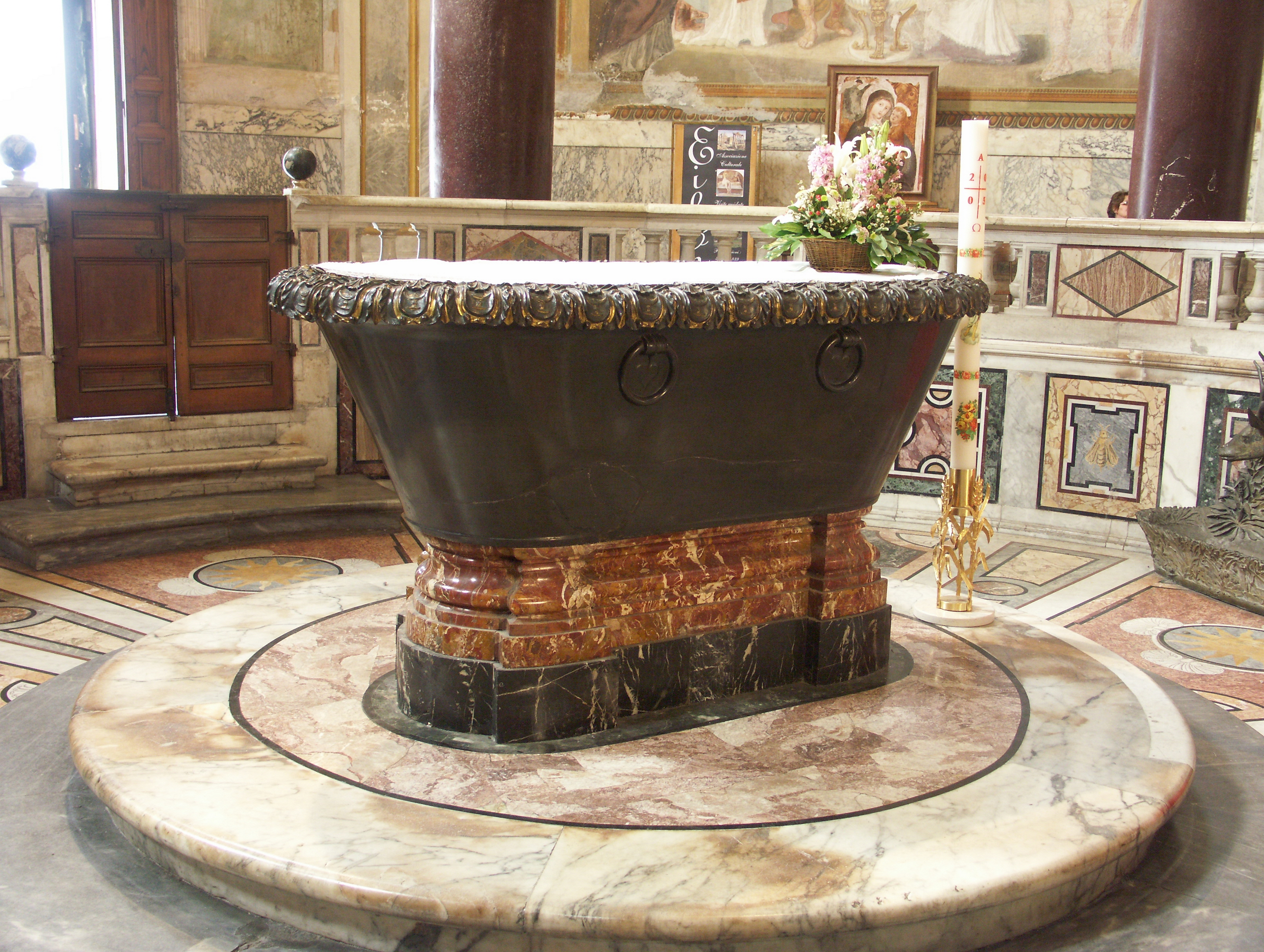
Lateran Baptistery Rome

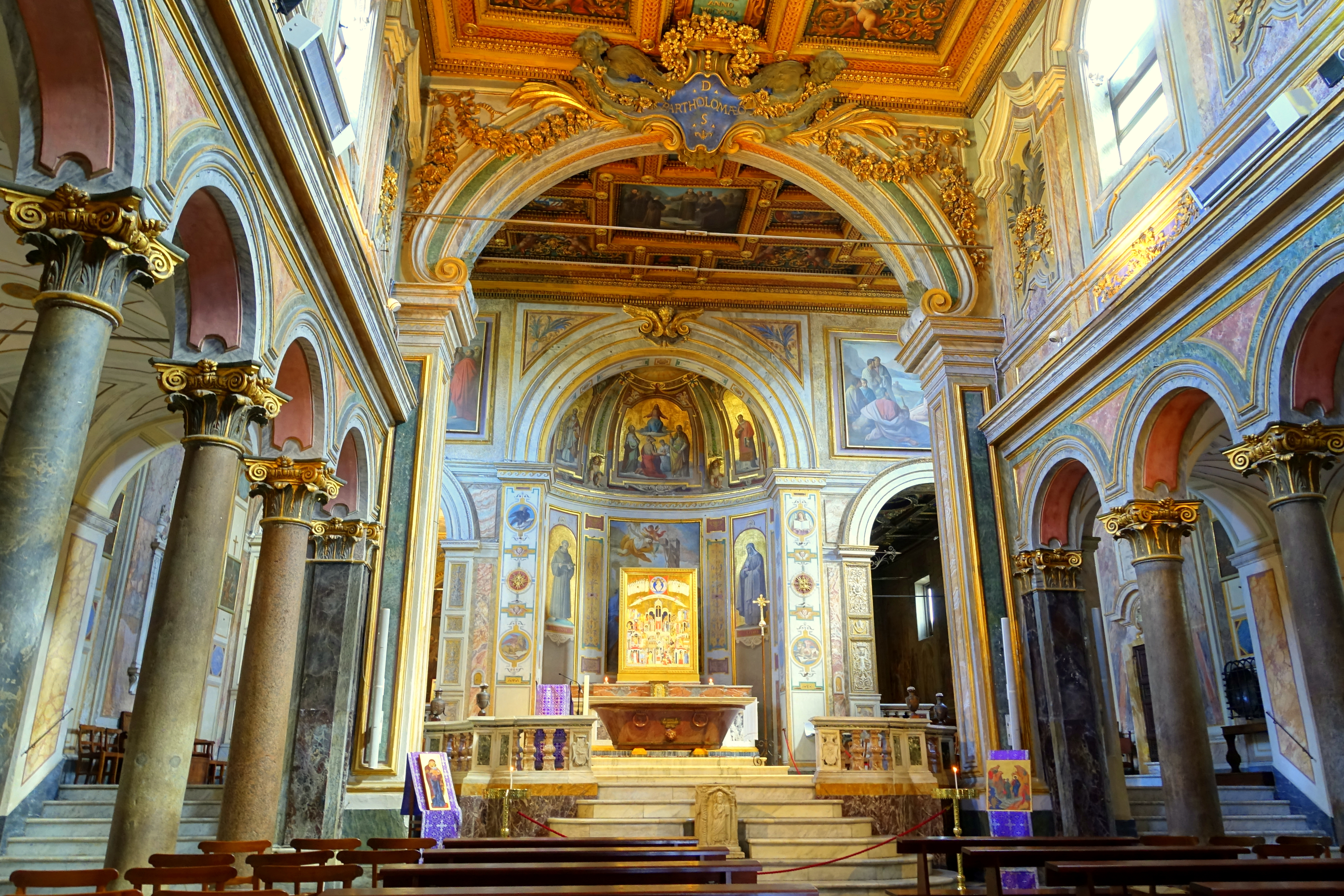
San Bartolomeo all'Isola, Rome

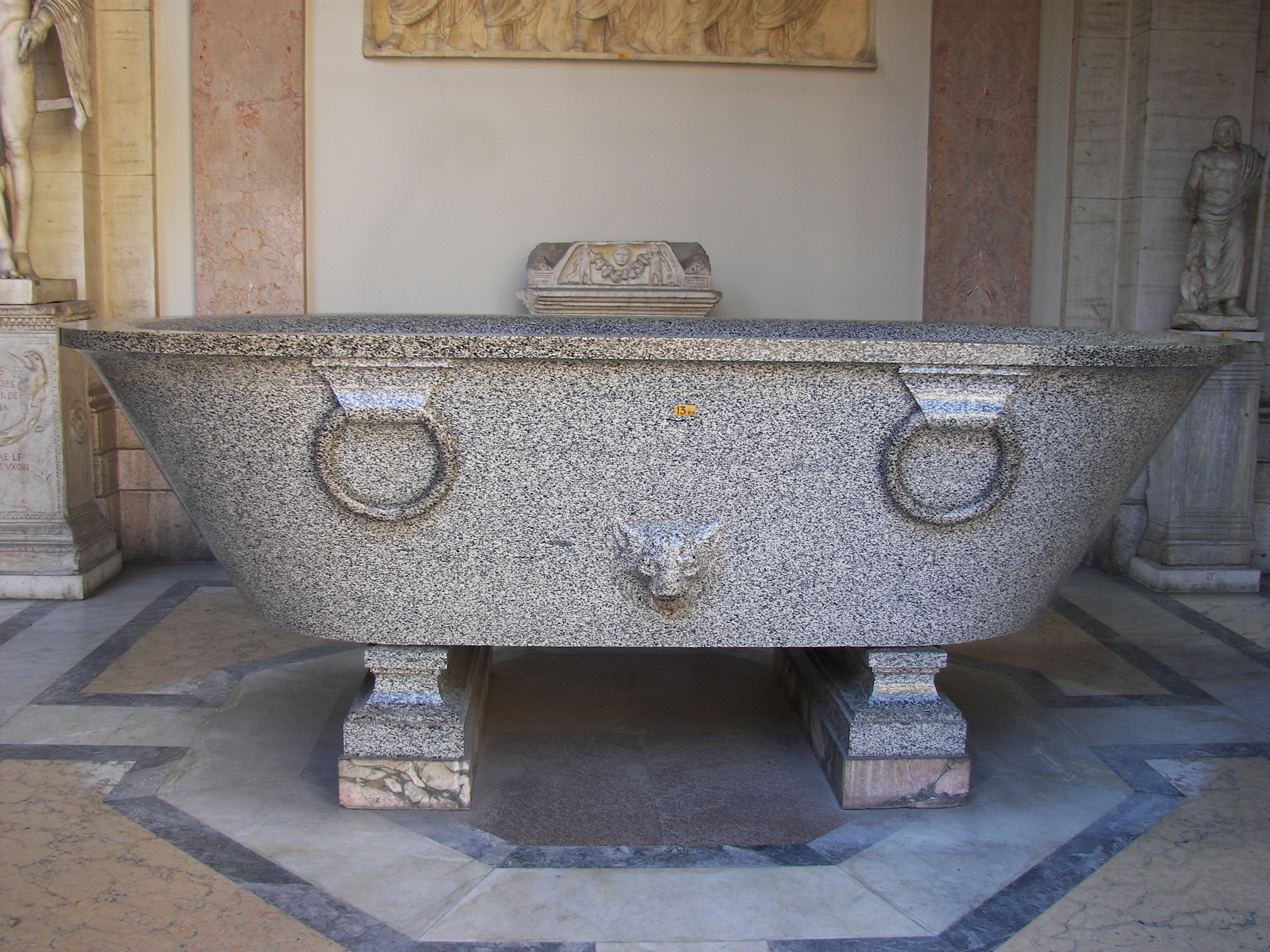
Pio-Clementino Museum Vatican

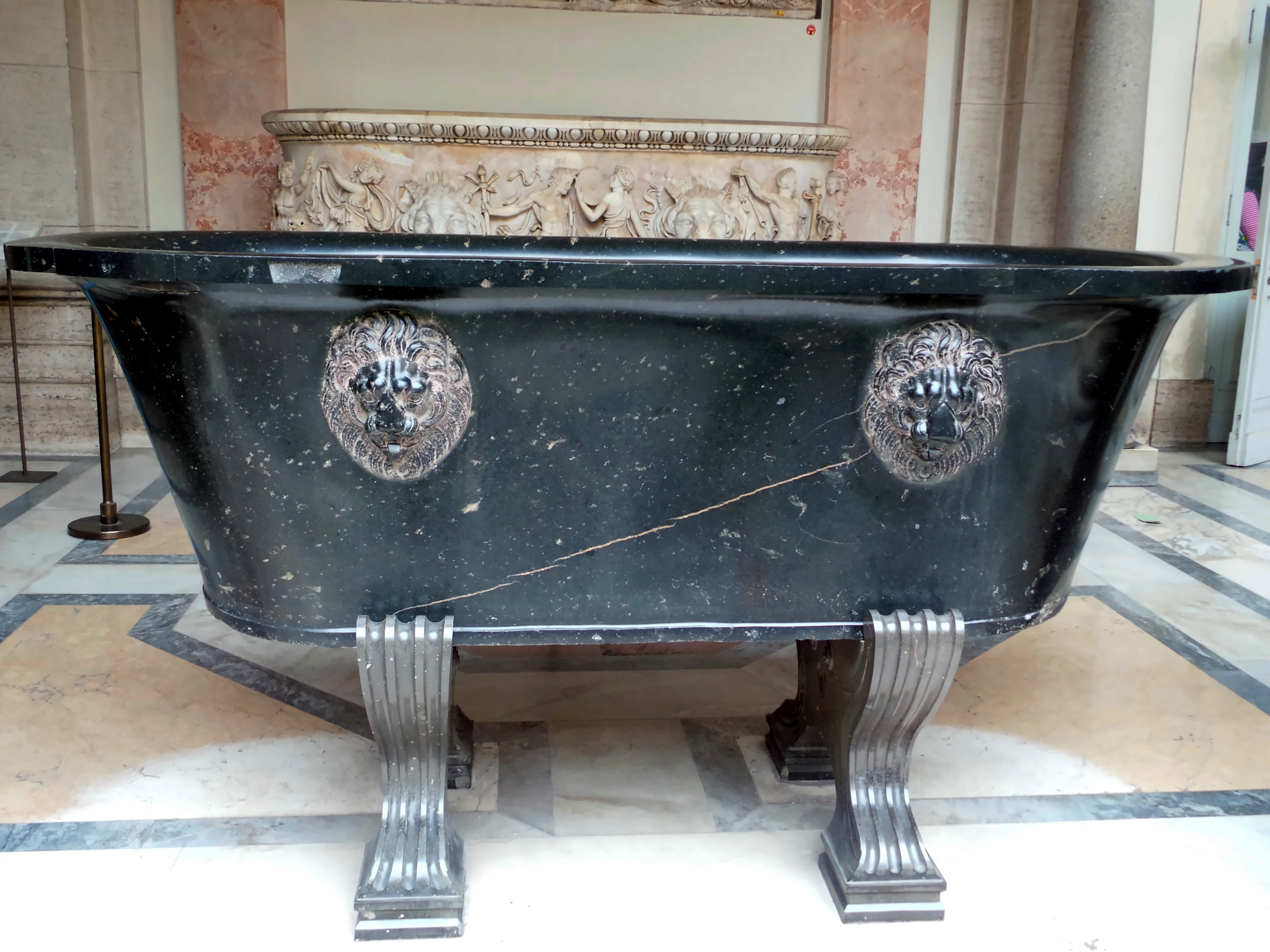
Labrum from Baths of Caracalla Vatican museum

== See also ==
- Roman technology
