= Lesbian erotica =

Visual art depiction of female-female sexuality

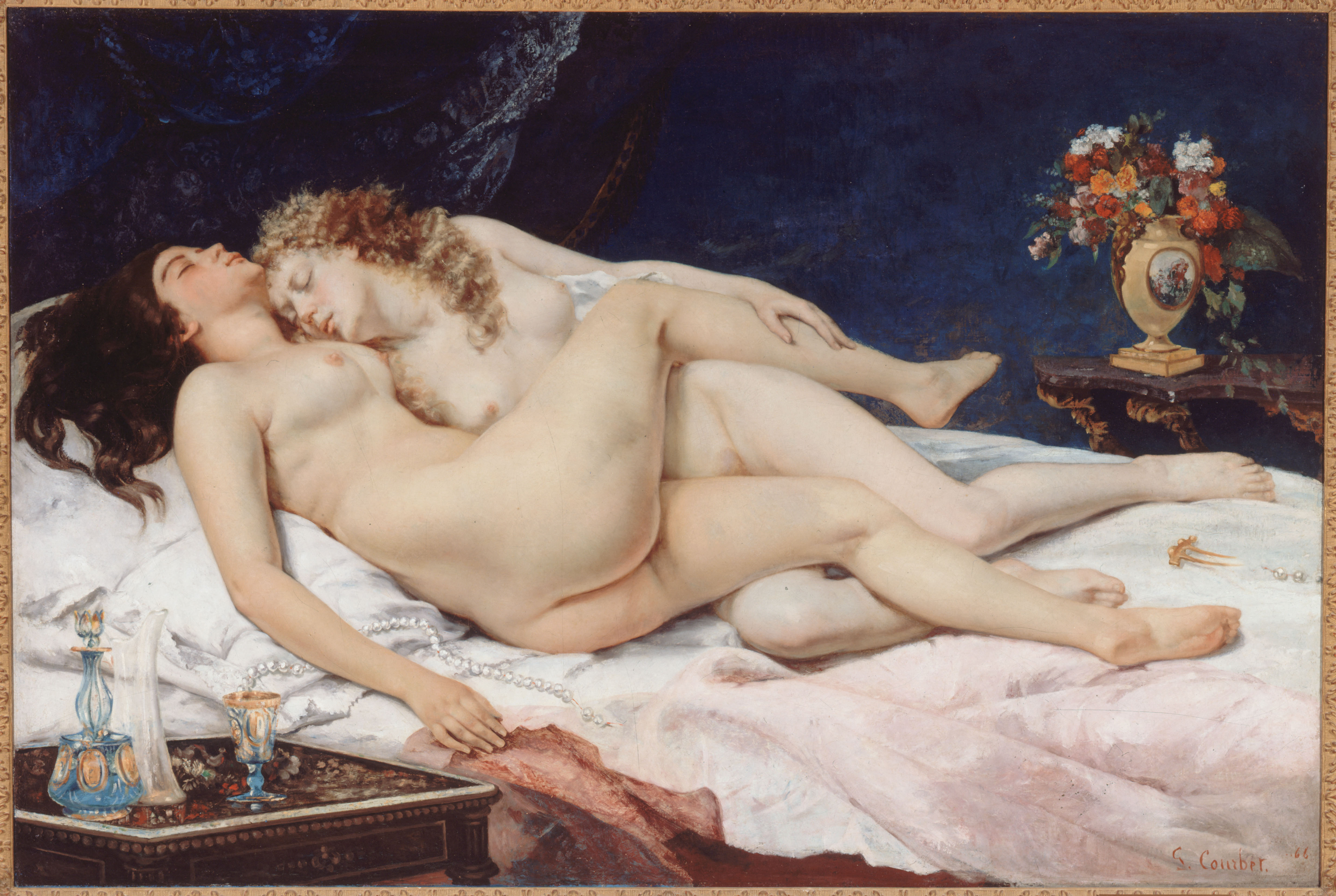
Le Sommeil (The Sleepers) by Gustave Courbet (1866)

Lesbian erotica is artistic depiction of lesbianism, which is the expression of female-on-female sexuality. Lesbianism has been a theme in erotic art since at least the time of ancient Rome, but much of the written material from the early modern period has been destroyed.

For much of the history of cinema and television, lesbianism was considered taboo. Since the 1960s, lesbian erotica has increasingly become a genre in its own right. Lesbian sexual content made its way into softcore movies and erotic thrillers.

== Written arts ==
During France in the 1700s, several male authors wrote works of lesbian-themed erotica, such as L'Espion Anglais.

In the 1800s, in France, the influence of Charles Baudelaire is considered crucial, on literature as well as on the visual arts, though according to Dorothy Kosinski it was a matter not for the high arts but mostly for popular erotica.

== Visual arts ==
=== Classic and classical depictions ===
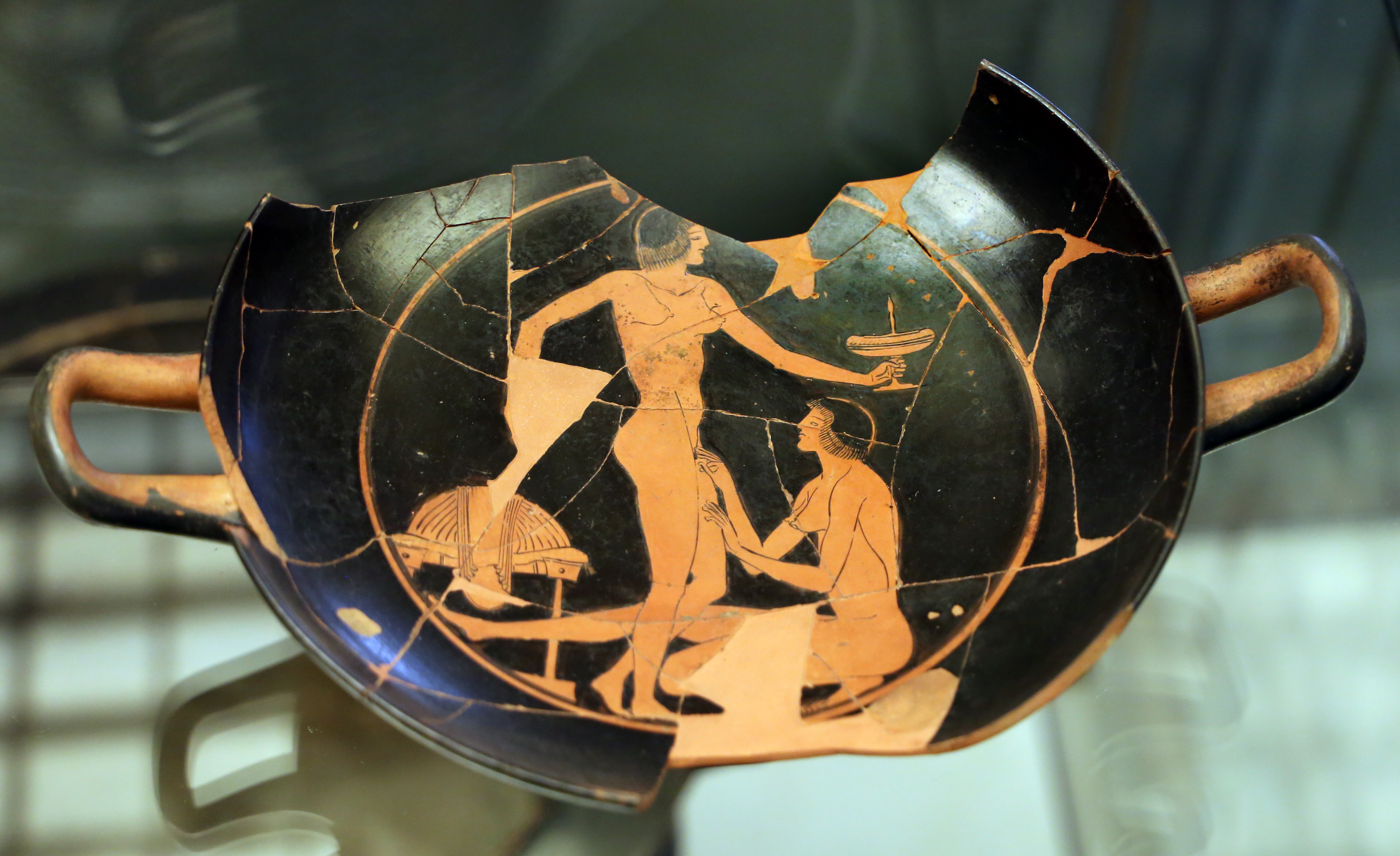
A red-figure kylix depicting two women in an intimate setting. The kneeling woman may be grooming the other woman or anointing her with oil or perfume. It has been suggested that the kylix may depict two women preparing themselves in the toilet, or it may be depicting intimacy. Attributed to the painter Apollodorus, c. 490–480 BCE. (Tarquinia National Museum)

An Attic red figure vase in the collection of the Tarquinia National Museum in Italy shows a kneeling woman touching the genitals of another woman, a rare explicit portrayal of sexual activity between women in Greek art, although it has also been interpreted as depicting one prostitute shaving or otherwise grooming the other in a non-sexual fashion. Depictions of lesbianism are found among the erotic frescoes of Pompeii.

Having all but disappeared during the Middle Ages, lesbian erotica became more common after the Renaissance. François Boucher and J. M. W. Turner were among the forerunners of 19th century artists who featured eroticism between women among their work. Like other painters (such as Jean-Honoré Fragonard), Boucher found inspiration in classical mythology. He was one of many artists to use various myths surrounding the goddess Diana, including the often-depicted story of Callisto, Diana's nymph who was seduced by Jupiter, with the god taking Diana's form since Callisto had vowed chastity.

=== 19th-century developments ===
In the 19th century, lesbianism became more openly discussed and found its way into many fields of art. Auguste Rodin's illustrations for Baudelaire's Les Fleurs du Mal included lesbian scenes. Gustave Courbet's Le Sommeil (1866) illustrates a scene from the 1835 story "Mademoiselle de Maupin" by Théophile Gautier (though Baudelaire's "Delphine et Hippolyte" from Les fleurs is also cited as an inspiration), depicting two women asleep after sex. Its lesbian subject matter was controversial enough to be the subject of a police report in 1872, but Courbet's painting is credited with inspiring others to depict "sapphic couple[s]", which in turn led to "soften[ing] taboos by revealing love between women and forcing society to see those whom it regarded as deviants and sinners." Nonetheless, the audience for such artwork was predominantly male (Courbet's painting was commissioned by a profligate Turkish diplomat), therefore "the term lesbian should perhaps be provided with quotation marks, insofar as we are dealing with images made by men, for men, and in which the very disposition of the women's bodies declares that they are arranged more for the eyes of the viewer than for those of one another." In the twentieth century the image's sensuality would appeal to lesbian viewers as well.

In 19th century French painting, lesbianism was often depicted within the context of orientalism, and was thus apt to be affected by the era's colonialism and imperialism; as a result, assumptions regarding race and class informed the images, especially when lesbianism was linked to harem and brothel scenes. Later depictions of lesbians in Western art may reflect like cultural mores, or merely borrow from formal pictorial conventions.

In the second half of the 19th century, the lesbian theme was well-established, and its artists include Henri de Toulouse-Lautrec, Constantin Guys, Edgar Degas, and Jean-Louis Forain. Later artists include Gustav Klimt, Egon Schiele, Christian Schad, Albert Marquet, Balthus, and Leonor Fini. More explicit depictions were an important part of the work of erotic illustrators such as Édouard-Henri Avril, Franz von Bayros, Martin van Maële, Rojan, Gerda Wegener, and Tom Poulton. Explicit depictions of sex between women were also an important theme in Japanese erotic shunga, including the work of such masters as Utamaro, Hokusai, Katsukawa Shunchō, Utagawa Kunisada, Utagawa Kuniyoshi, Yanagawa Shigenobu, Keisai Eisen, and Kawanabe Kyōsai.

In art photography, notable artists to work with lesbian themes include David Hamilton and Bob Carlos Clarke. Lesbian and bisexual photographers such as Nan Goldin, Tee Corinne, and Judy Francesconi have focused on erotic themes, reclaiming a subject that has traditionally been mainly treated through the eye of male artists.

== Cinema and television ==
Lesbian and erotic themes were restrained or coded in early cinema. Even scenes suggestive of lesbianism were controversial, such as the presentation of women dancing together in Pandora's Box (1929) and The Sign of the Cross (1932). Pandora's Box is notable for its lesbian subplot with the Countess (Alice Roberts) being defined by her masculine look and because she wears a tuxedo. Lesbian themes were found in European films such as Mädchen in Uniform (1931). By the mid-1930s, the Hays Code banned any homosexual themes in Hollywood-made films and several pre-Code films had to be cut to be re-released. For example, The Sign of the Cross originally included the erotic "Dance of the Naked Moon", but the dance was considered a "lesbian dance" and was cut for a 1938 reissue. Even suggestions of a romantic attraction between women were rare, and the "L-word" was taboo. Lesbianism was not treated in American cinema until the 1962 release of Walk on the Wild Side in which there is a subtly implied lesbian relationship between Jo and Hallie. Depictions of sex between women first appeared in several films of the late 1960s – The Fox (1967), The Killing of Sister George (1968), and Therese and Isabelle (1968).

During the 1970s, depictions of sex between women were largely restricted to semi-pornographic softcore and sexploitation films, such as Cherry, Harry & Raquel! (1970), Le Rempart des béguines (1972), Score (1974), Emmanuelle (1974), Bilitis (1977) and Caligula (1979). Although semi-explicit heterosexual sex scenes had been part of mainstream cinema since the late 1960s, equivalent depictions of women having sex only began making their appearance in mainstream film during the 1980s. These were typically in the context of a film that was specifically lesbian-themed, such as Personal Best (1982), Lianna (1983), and Desert Hearts (1985). The vampire film The Hunger (1983) also contained a seduction and sex scene between Catherine Deneuve and Susan Sarandon. Jacques Saurel's film "Joy et Joan" (1985) also belongs to this new more-than-softcore film performance.

Henry & June (1990) had several lesbian scenes, including one that was considered explicit enough to give the film an NC-17 rating. (There was some controversy as to whether the MPAA had given the film a more restrictive rating than it normally would have because of the lesbian nature of the scene in question.) Basic Instinct (1992) contained mild lesbian content, but established lesbianism as a theme in the erotic thriller genre. Later, in the 1990s, erotic thrillers such as Showgirls, Wild Side (1995), Crash (1996) and Bound (1996) explored lesbian relationships and contained explicit lesbian sex scenes.

The Showtime drama series The L Word (2004–2009) features relationships among lesbian and bisexual female characters, and contains numerous explicit sex scenes.

== Pornography ==
Both softcore and hardcore pornographic lesbian content are very popular, with numerous adult video titles, websites, and studios (such as Girlfriends Films and Sweetheart Video) devoted entirely to sapphic sex. They are often directed toward heterosexual men, increasingly developed for lesbians and bisexuals, and favored by many straight women. While male viewers typically outnumber females on frequently visited adult sites like Pornhub, the percentage of female viewers who prefer lesbian porn is relatively higher than that of males with the same preference.

== Responses to lesbian erotica ==
=== Feminist views ===
Feminist views on sex between women in erotica are complex. Historically, women have been less involved in the production and consumption of erotica in general and visual pornography in particular than have men. Since the late 1960s, radical feminist objections to pornography and the sexual objectification of women have influenced the lesbian community, with some feminists objecting to all pornography. However, since the end of the 1980s' "Feminist Sex Wars" and the beginning of the "women's erotica" movement, feminist views on pornography, both lesbian and heterosexual, have shifted.

Some lesbians are even consumers of mainstream pornography, but many dislike what they perceive as inaccurate and stereotypical depictions of women and lesbianism in mainstream pornography. Some are also uncomfortable with male interest in lesbians. As of the early 2000s, there is a very strong lesbian erotic literature movement, as well as a small genre of pornography made by lesbians for a lesbian audience.

An increasing amount of queer erotic literature has been released in recent decades, written by women and usually for women. There is a large sub-category of this erotica that involves various queer relationships while also including bisexuality and transgender characters into the writing. By introducing various other identities and sexualities, it opens up the erotica world to more gender-fluidity and acceptance of other queer or non-heteronormative sexualities.

=== Effects on heterosexual men ===
The topic of how men respond to lesbian erotica has been studied extensively. Several penile plethysmography studies have shown high levels of arousal in heterosexual men to lesbian-themed pornography. Findings differ as to whether heterosexual men typically prefer heterosexual-themed pornography or lesbian-themed pornography.

Male perception of lesbianism as erotic has been shown to correspond with recent exposure to lesbian pornography; however, men who have recently viewed lesbian pornography are no more likely than others to perceive lesbians as hypersexual and/or bisexual. Bernard E. Whitley Jr., et al. hypothesized, upon reaching this conclusion, that "pornography may [...] lead heterosexual men to view lesbianism as erotic by means of a generalized association of female-female sexual activity with sexual arousal", but noted that "more research is needed to clarify the relationship between exposure to pornography and the perceived erotic value of lesbianism."

Several studies suggest that men who perceive lesbianism as erotic may have less negative attitudes toward lesbians than they do toward gay men. Studies have further shown that, while men tend to correlate lesbianism with eroticism more often than women do, women perceive male homosexuality as erotic no more often than men do.

== Illustrations depicting lesbian erotica ==
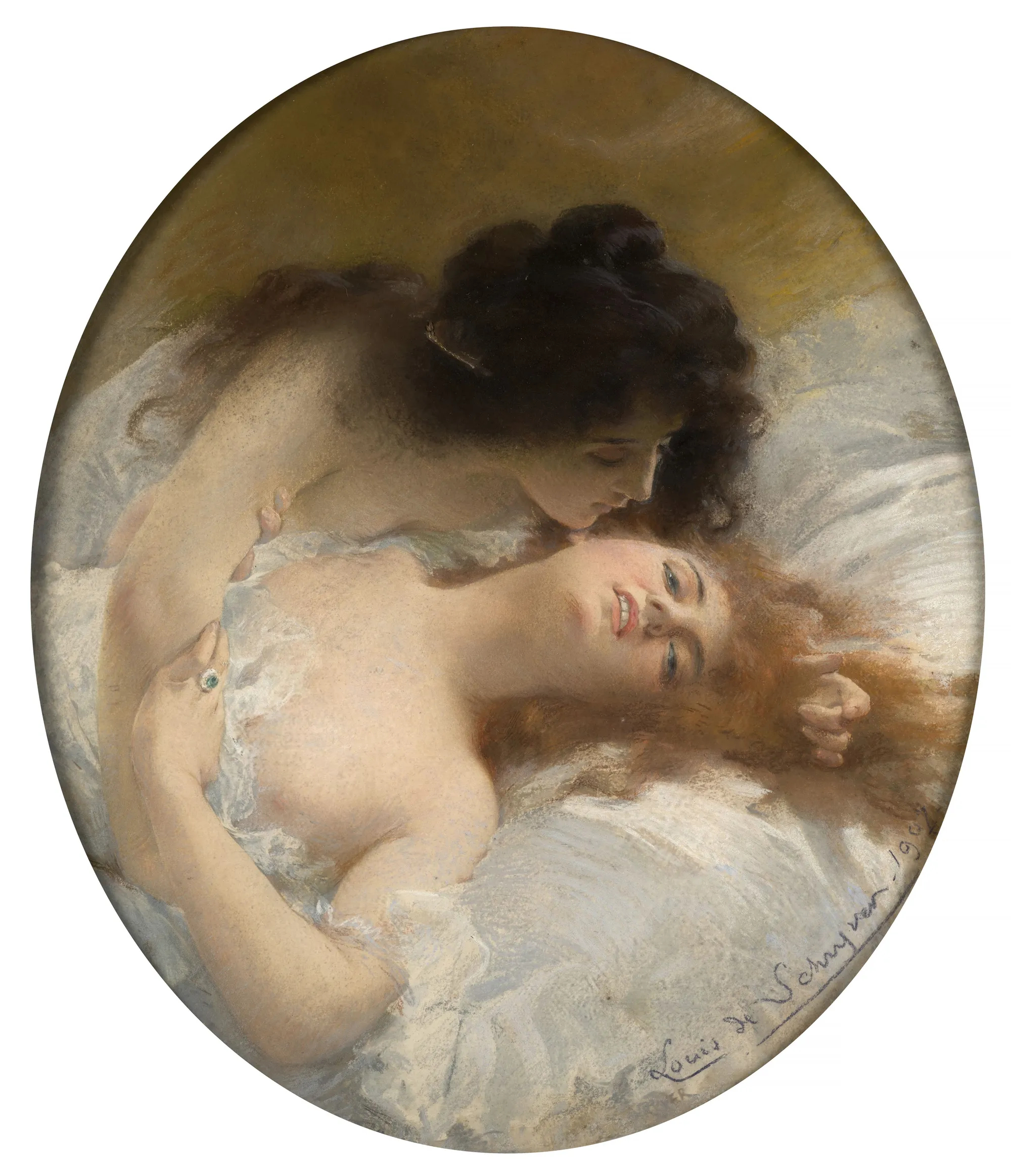
Louis Marie de Schryver - Lesbians, 1907

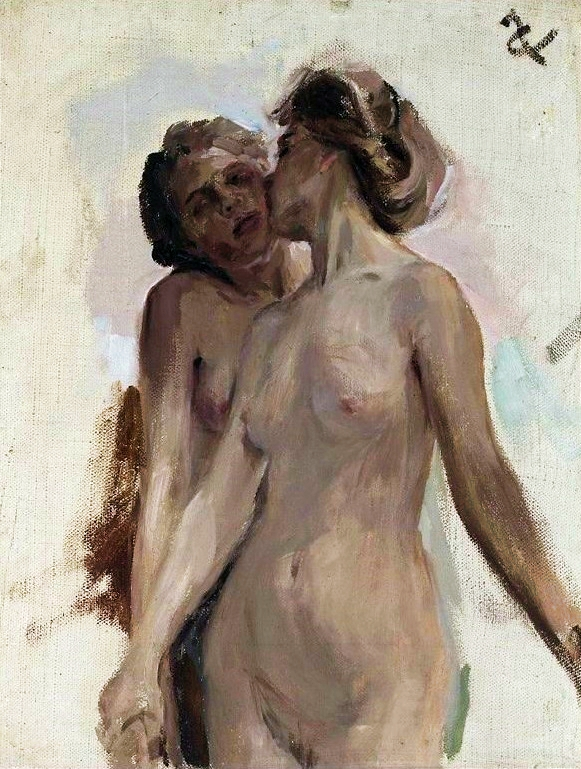
Jan Ciągliński - Symbolic dance, 1766 - National Museum in Warsaw

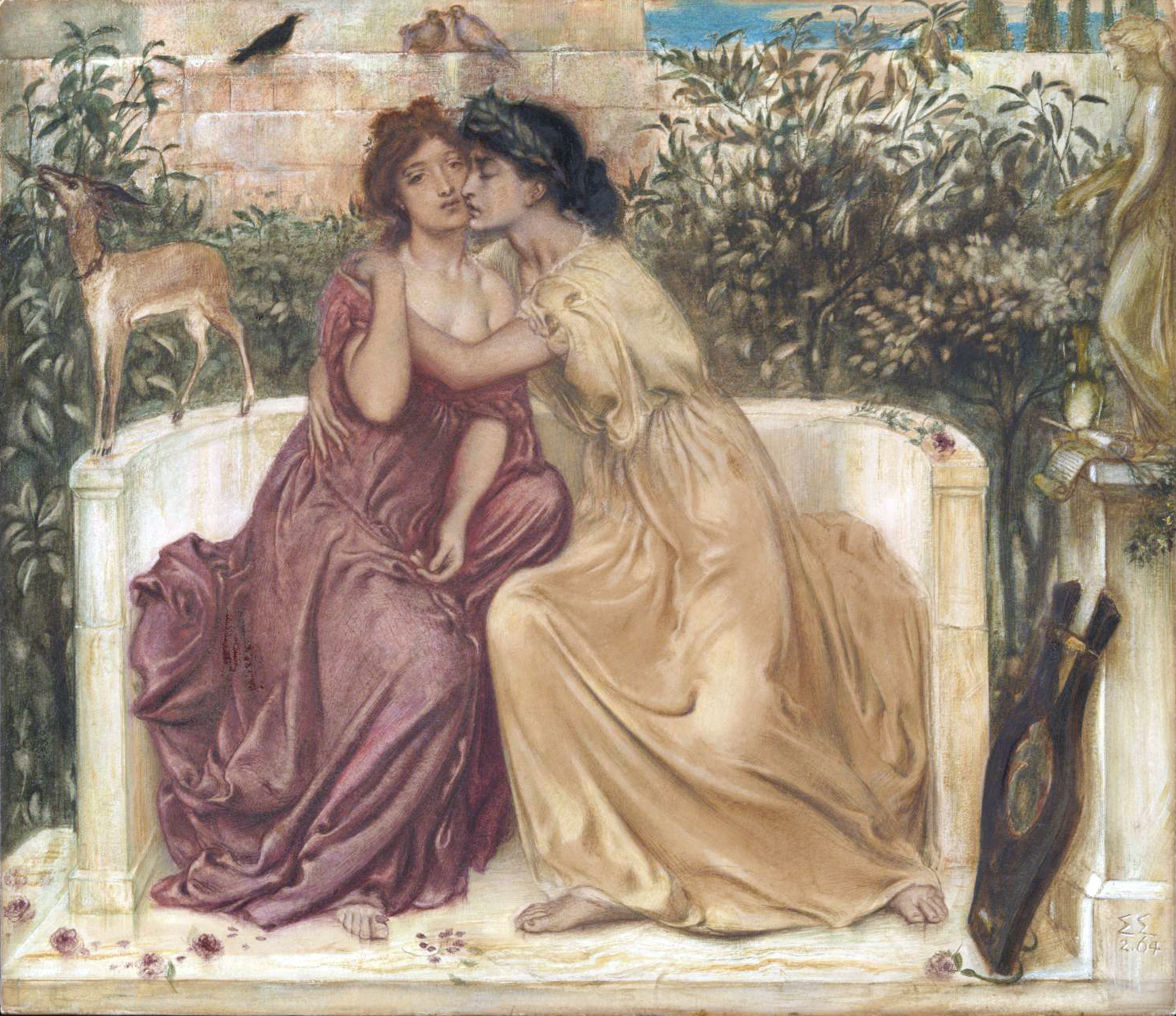
Sappho and Erinna in a Garden at Mytilene by Simeon Solomon, 1864

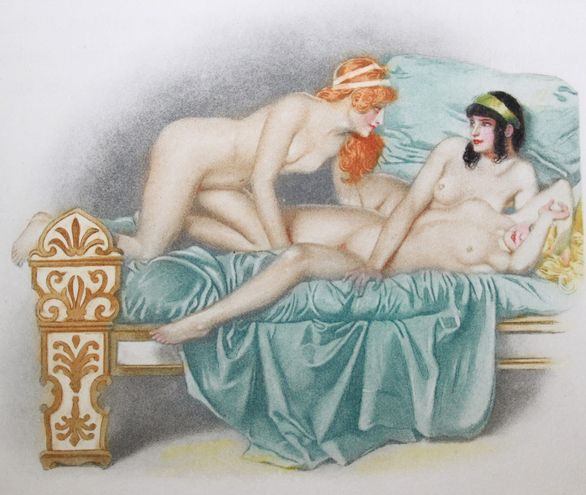
Illustration de Maurice Ray pour le roman Aphrodite de Pierre Louÿs en 1931.

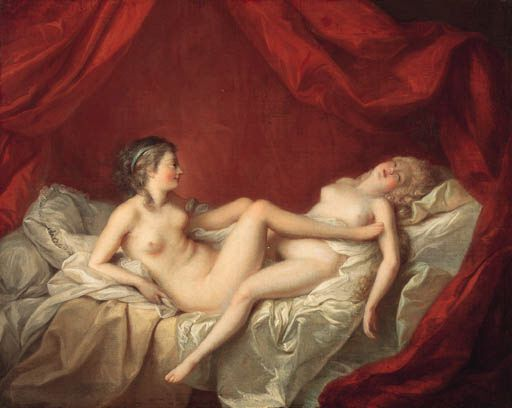
"Les Deux Amies" par Jean-Jacques Lagrenée (1739-1821).

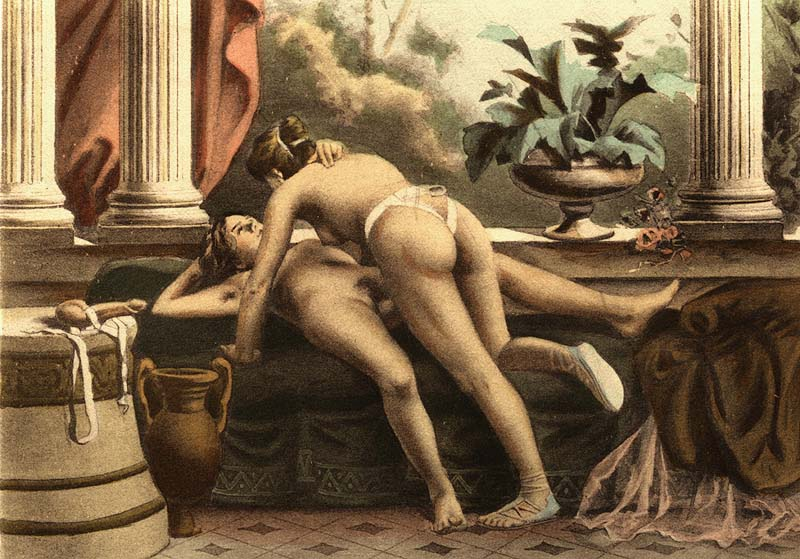
Late 19th-century painting by Édouard-Henri Avril showing the use of a strap-on dildo

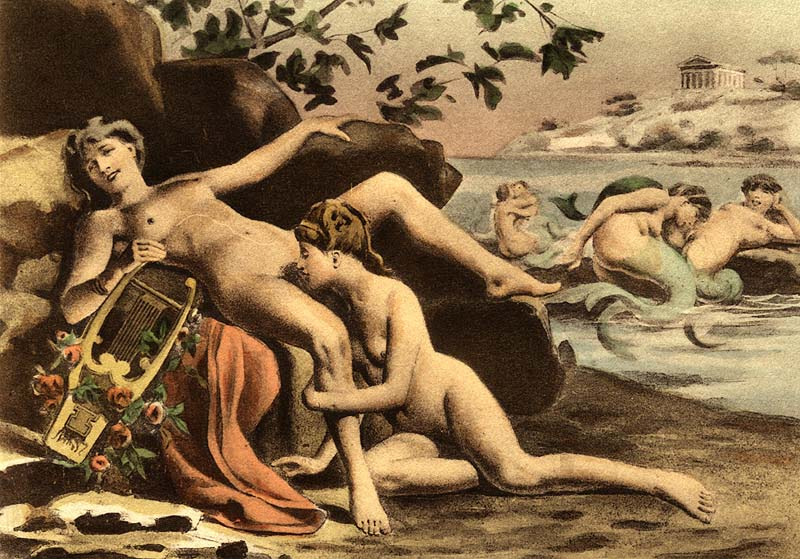
On Lesbos, Sappho partakes in cunnilingus (by Édouard-Henri Avril)

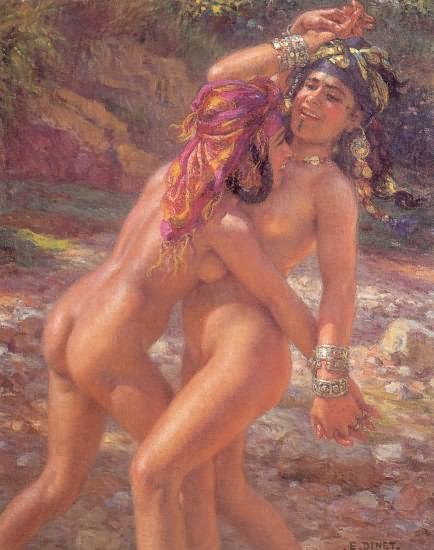
La lutte des baigneuses - Etienne Dinet

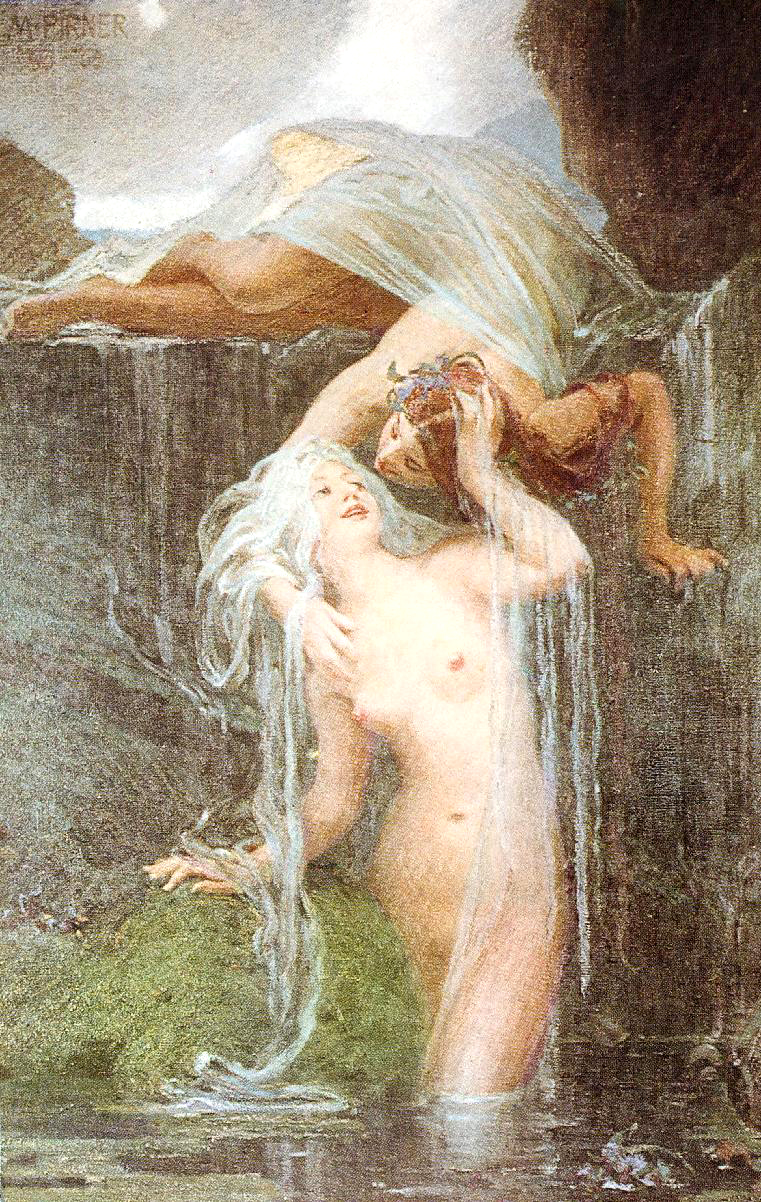
Maxmilian Pirner - potok (1903

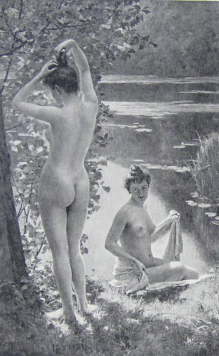
Alexandre Jacques Chantron - Pleasures of Summer

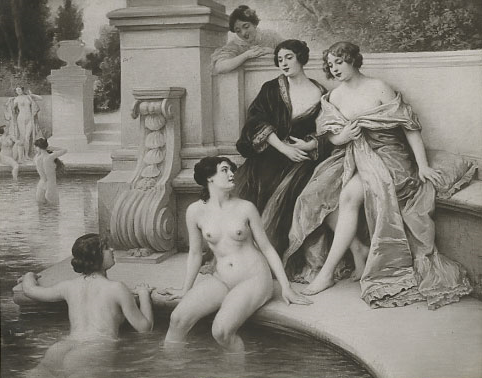
J Scalbert - The Bath

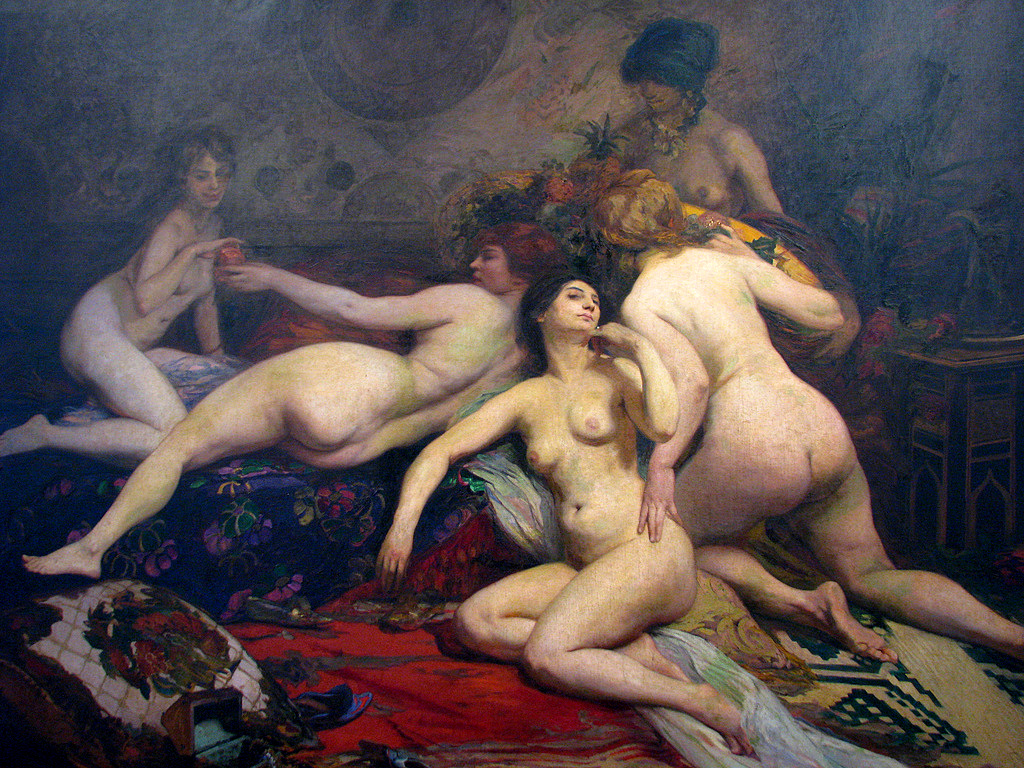
Virgílio Maurício - L'heure du Gouter, 1914

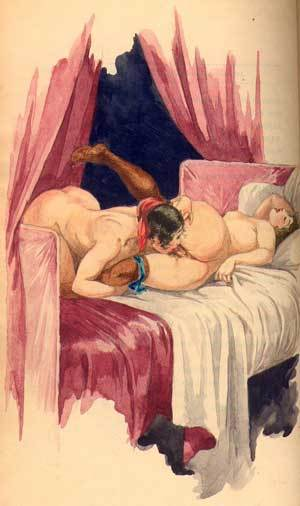
Dessins de Martin van Maele

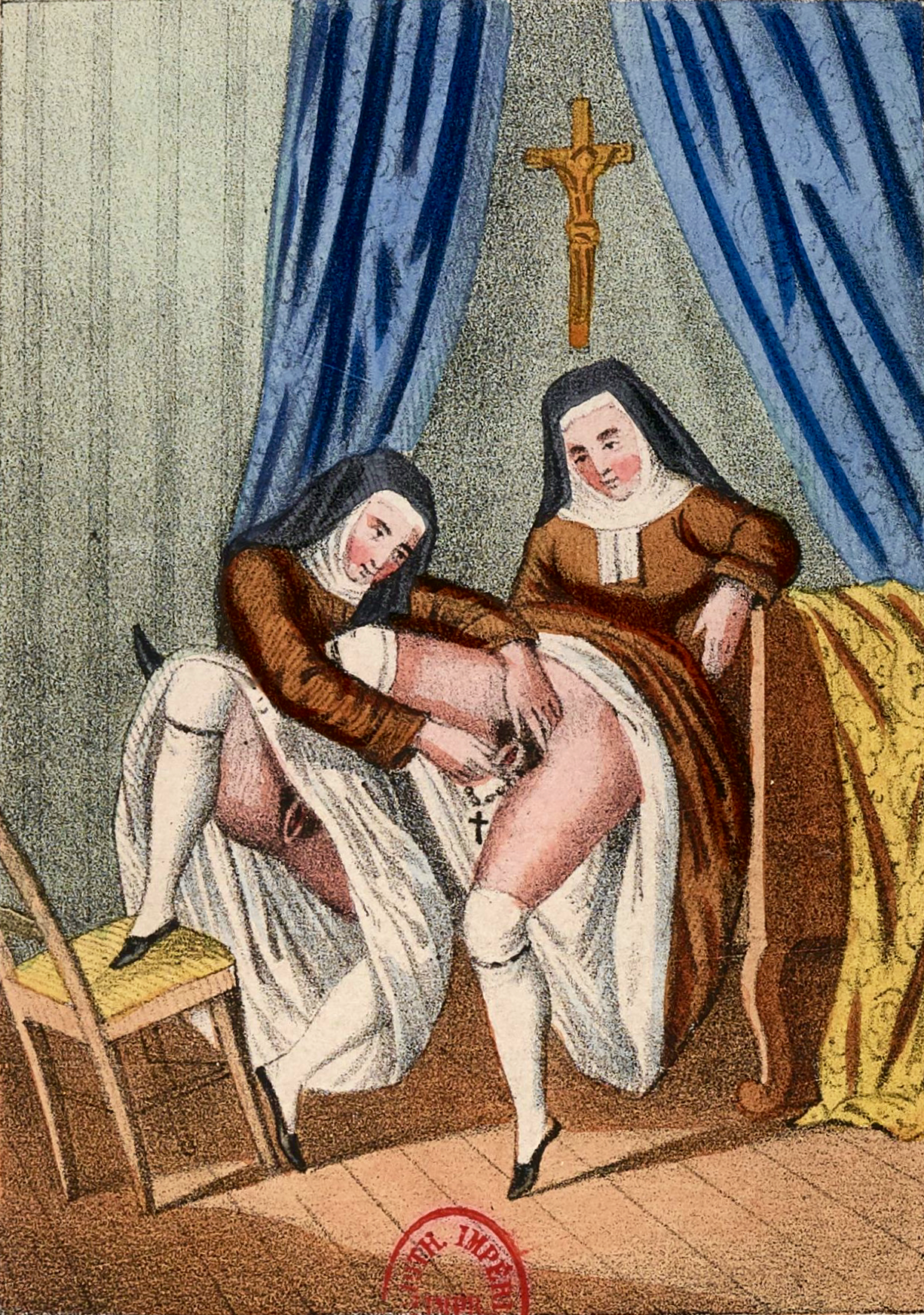
Amours, galanteries, intrigues, ruses et crimes des capucins et des religieuses, 1788

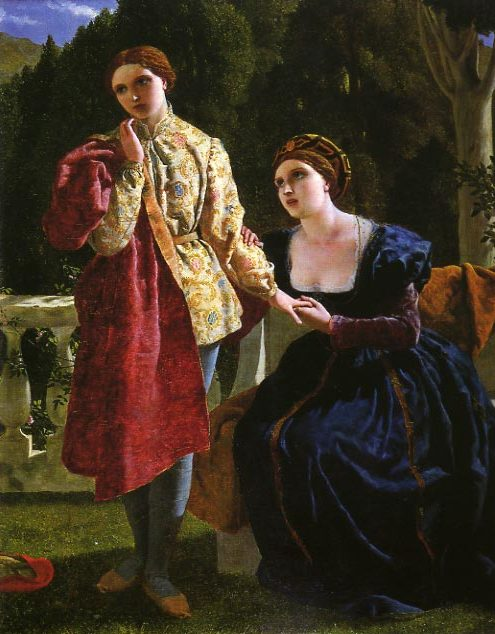
Viola and the Countess - Frederick Richard Pickersgill

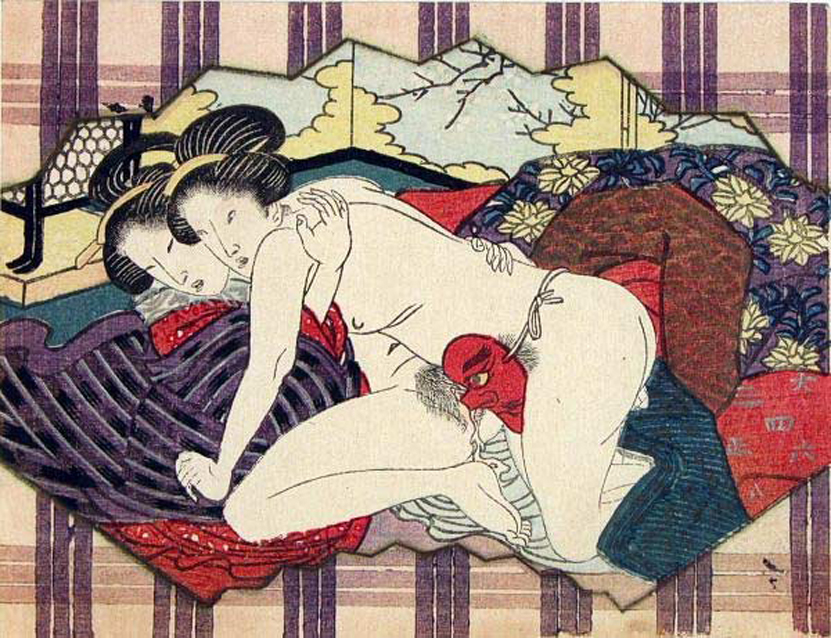
A historic shunga woodblock printing from Japan depicting two women having sex.

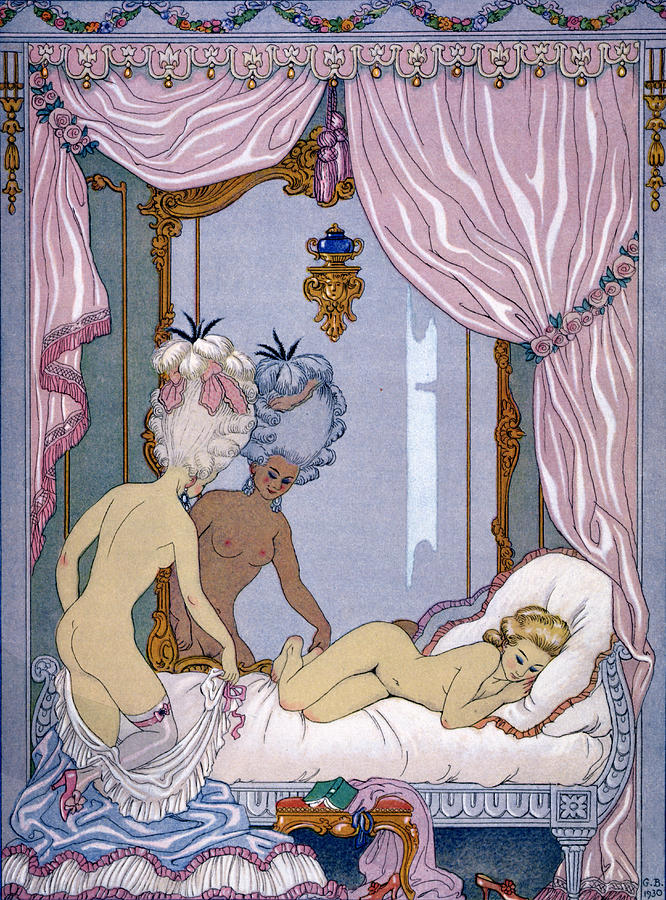
Les Liaisons dangereuses, Scène du lit par George Barbier, 1920.

Autour du monde (1843)

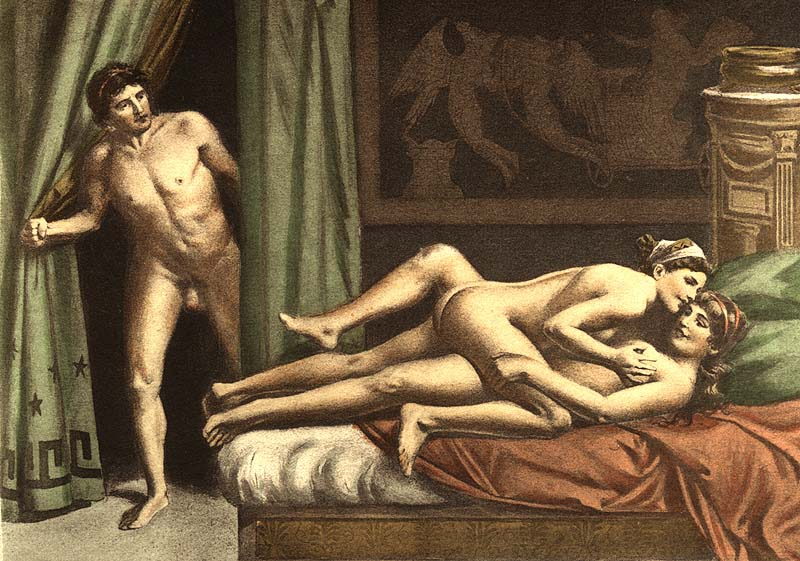
Plate XV from "De Figuris Veneris"

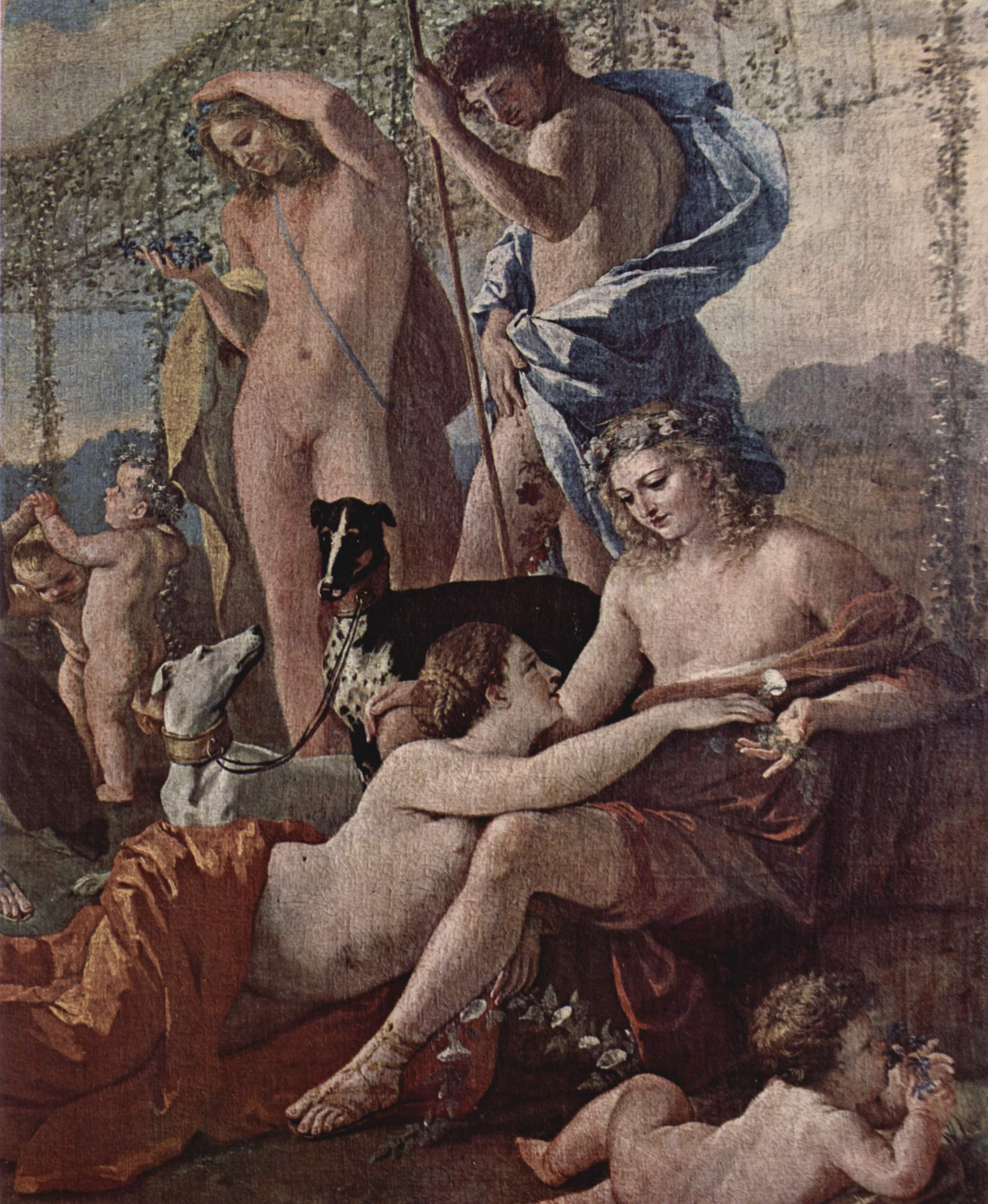
Nicolas Poussin - L'Empire de Flore

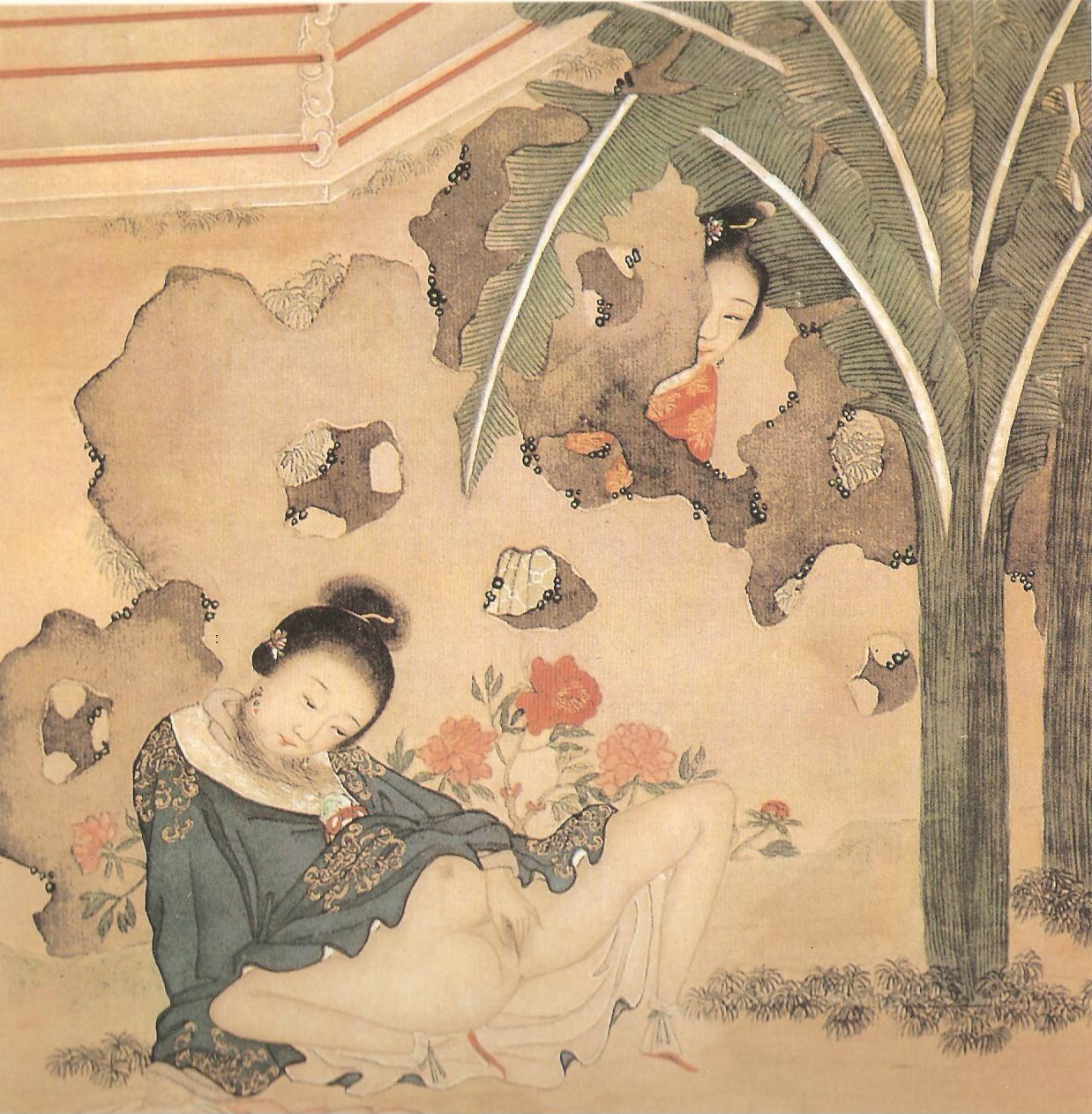
清代秘戲圖

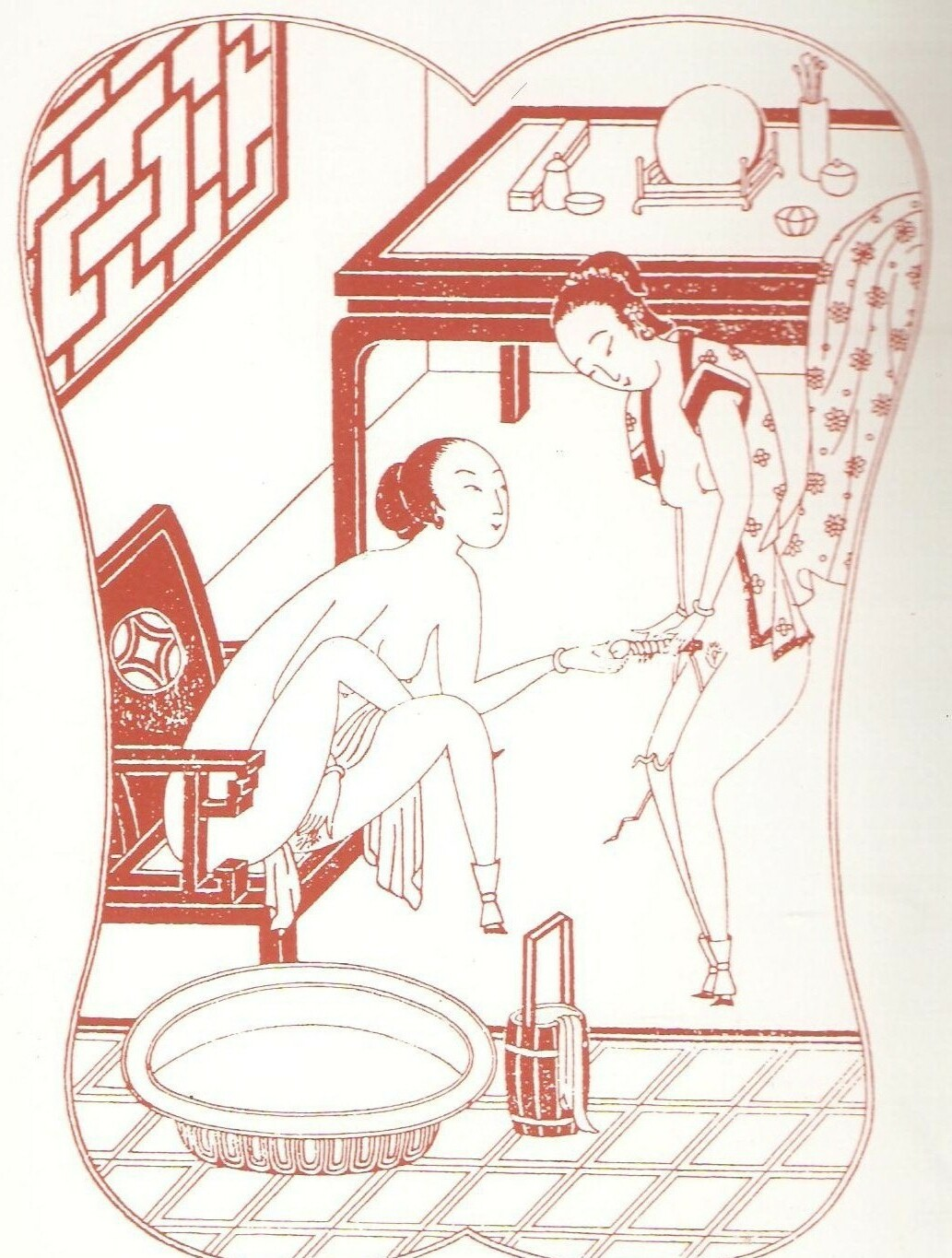
清代秘戲圖

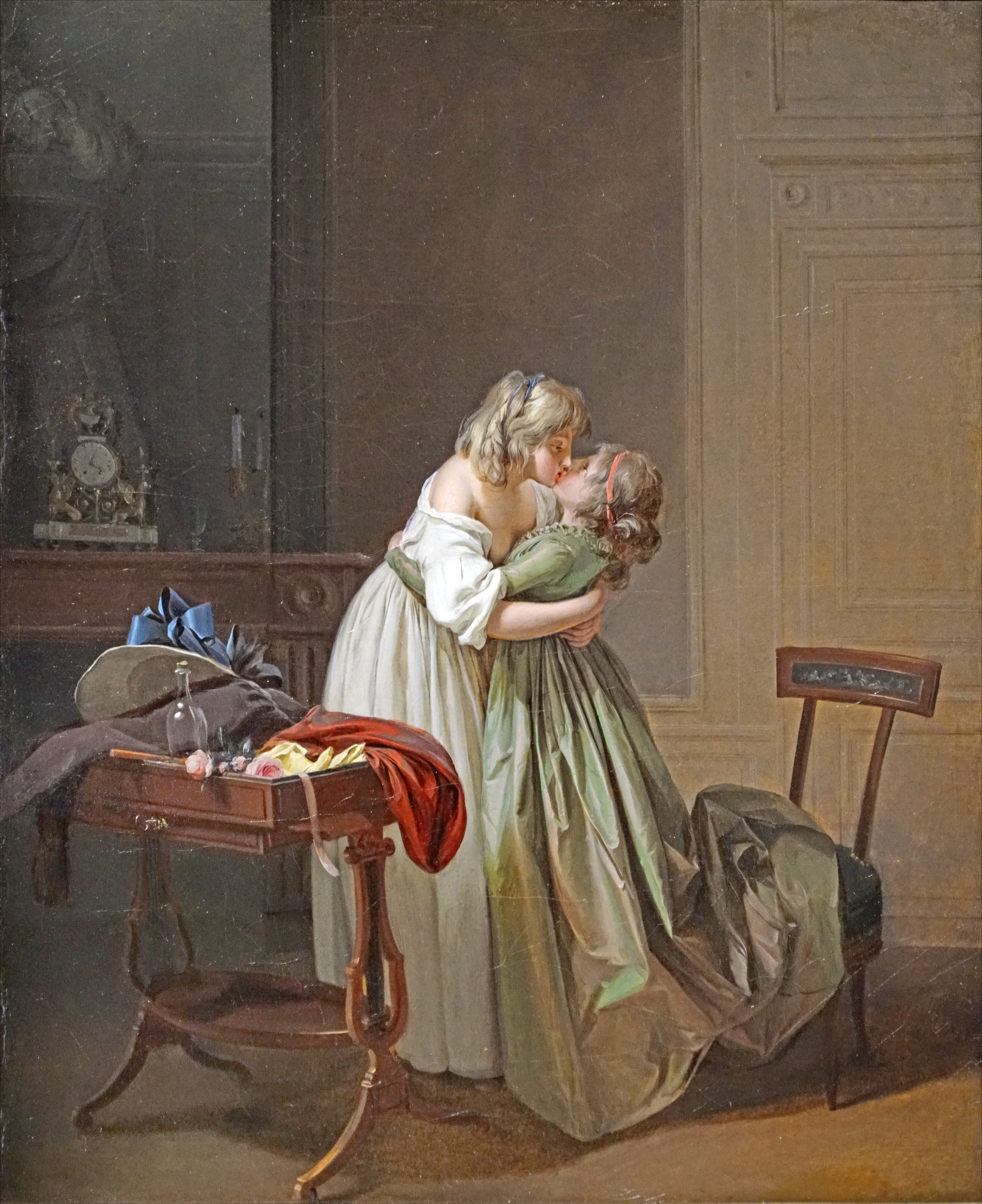
"Deux jeunes amies qui s'embrassent" de L.L. Boilly

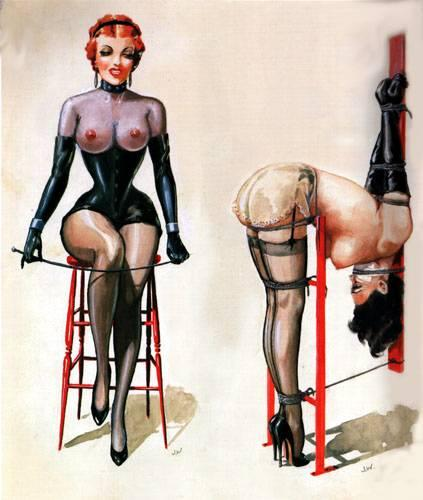
S/M lesbian sexuality

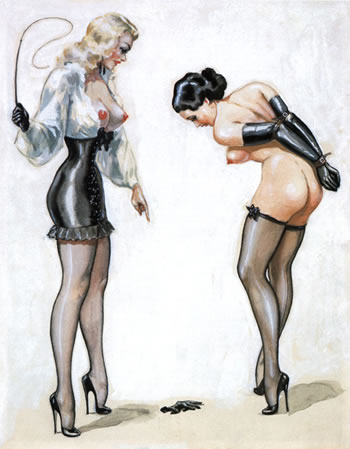
S/M lesbian sexuality

S/M lesbian sexuality

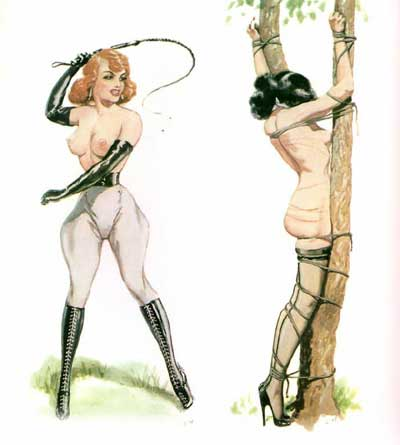
S/M lesbian sexuality

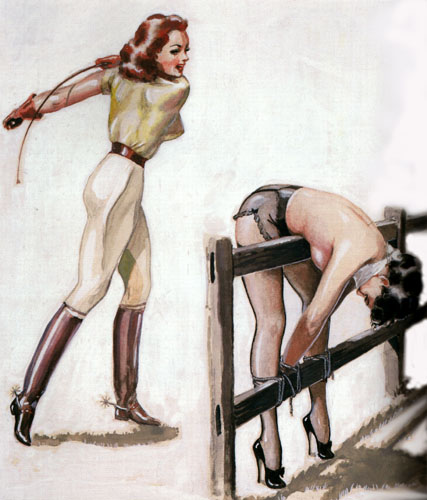
S/M lesbian sexuality

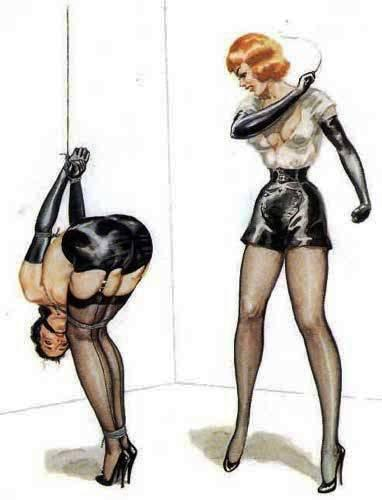
S/M lesbian sexuality

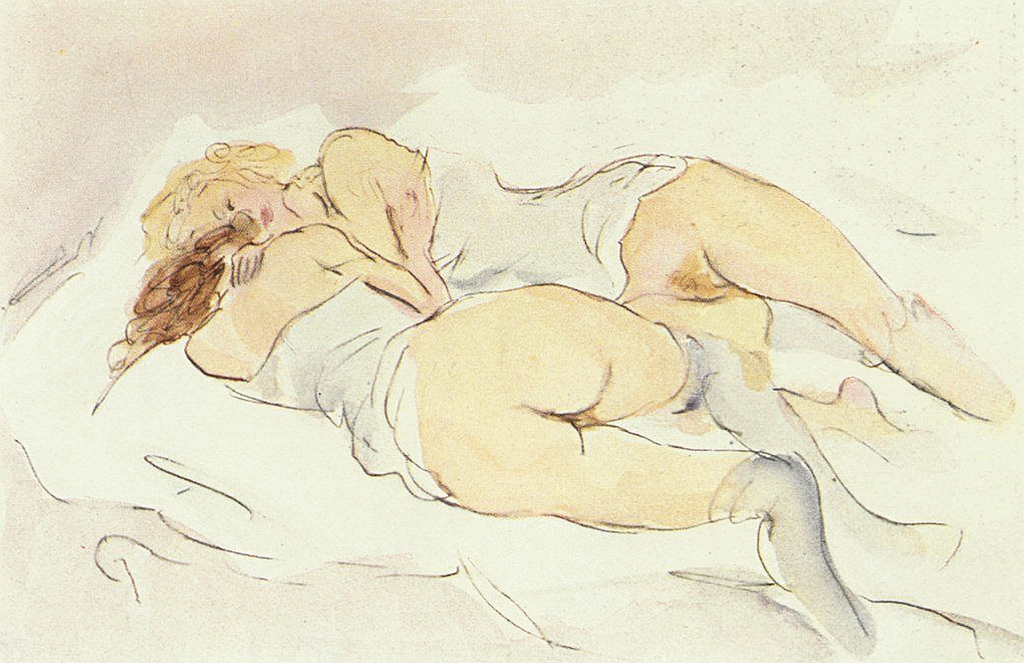
Otto Schoff, Siesta

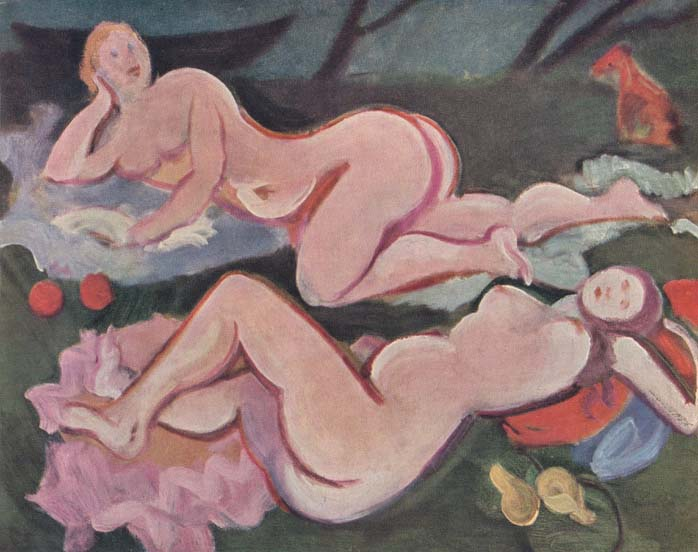
Kremlička - Weekend

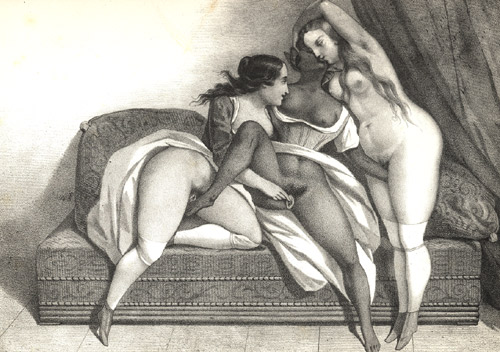
Lesbisches Spiel, Anonyme Lithographie, 1840

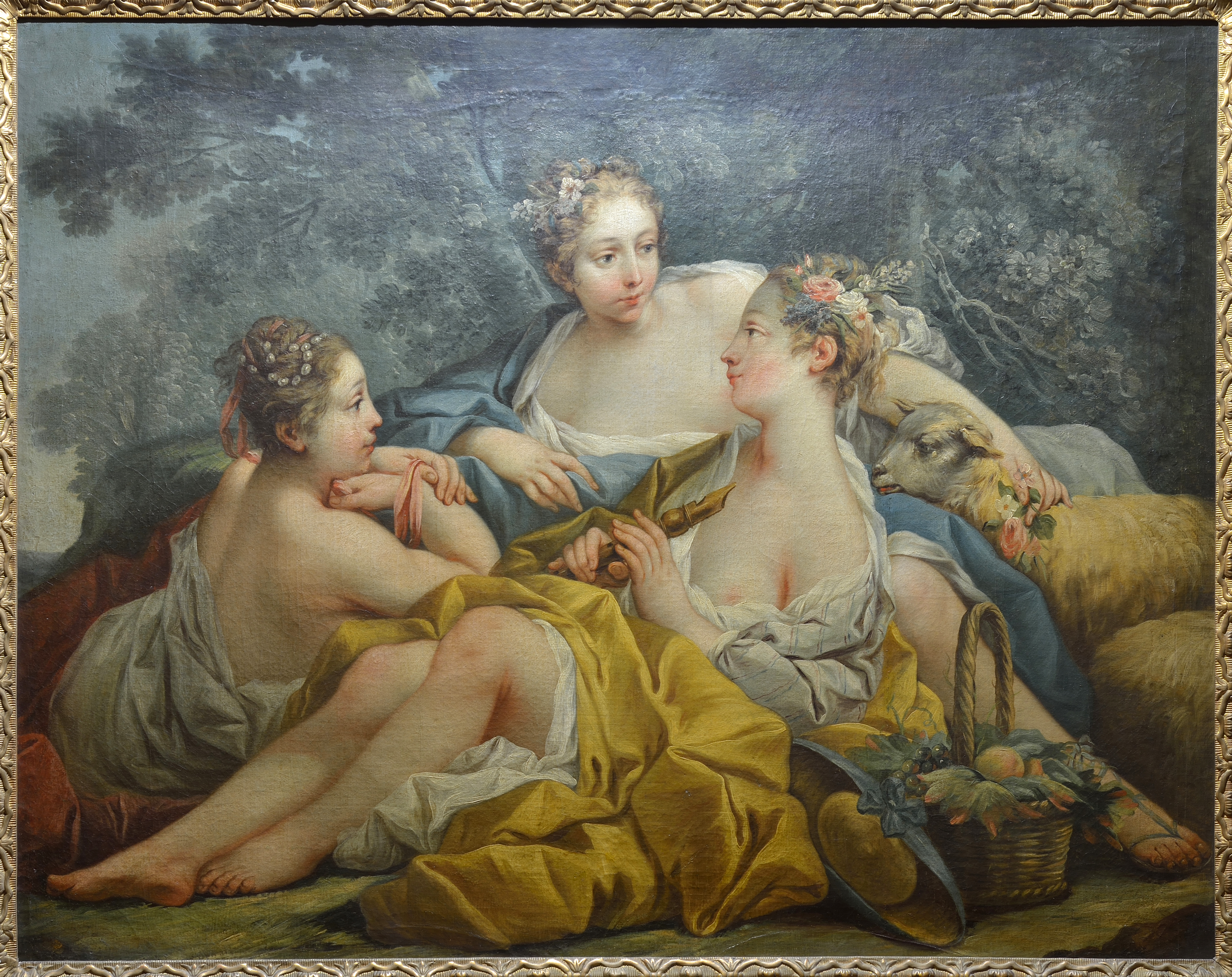
Negresco Nymphes playing the flute by François Boucher

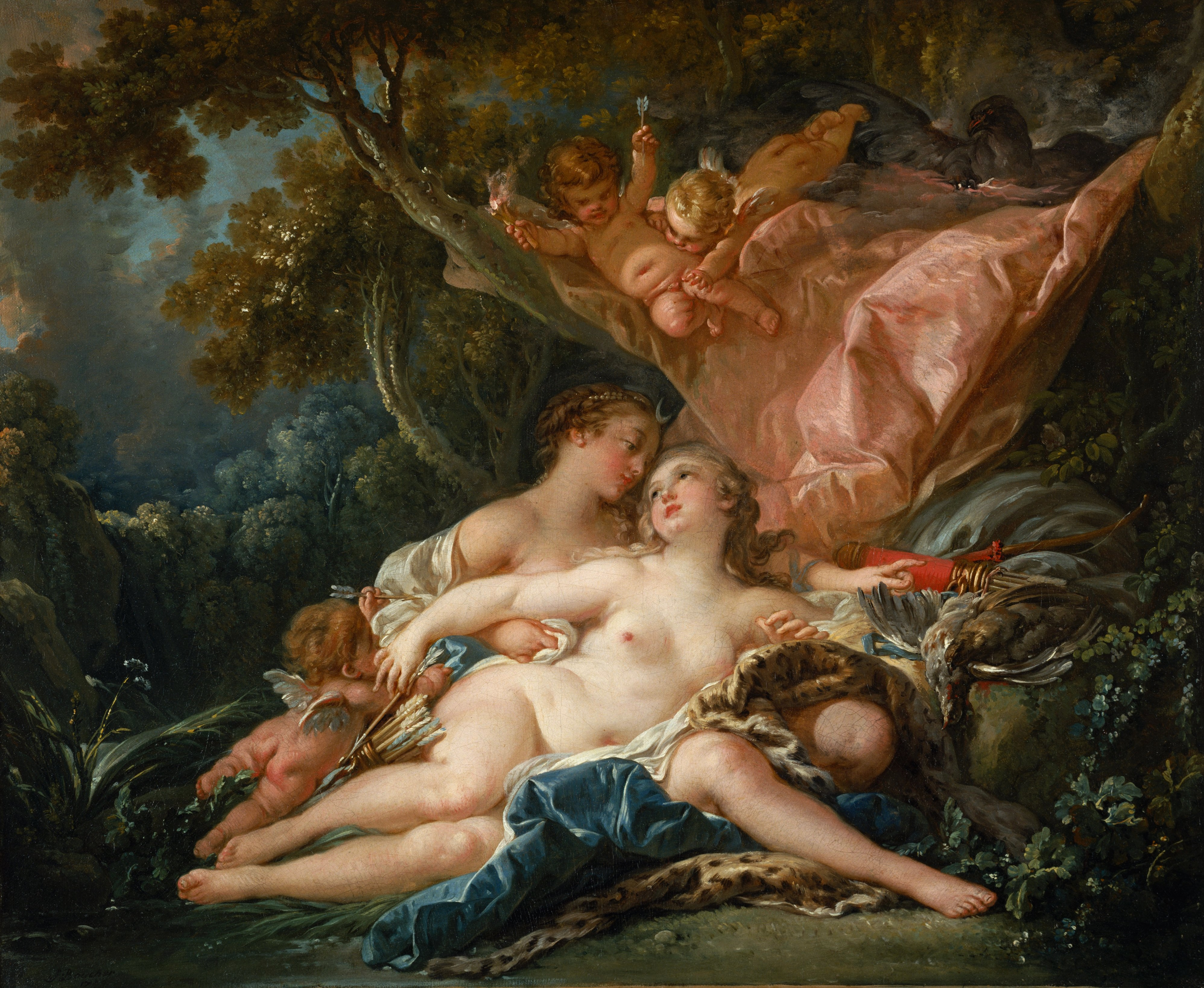
Boucher, The nymph Callisto, seduced by Jupiter in the shape of Diana (1759)

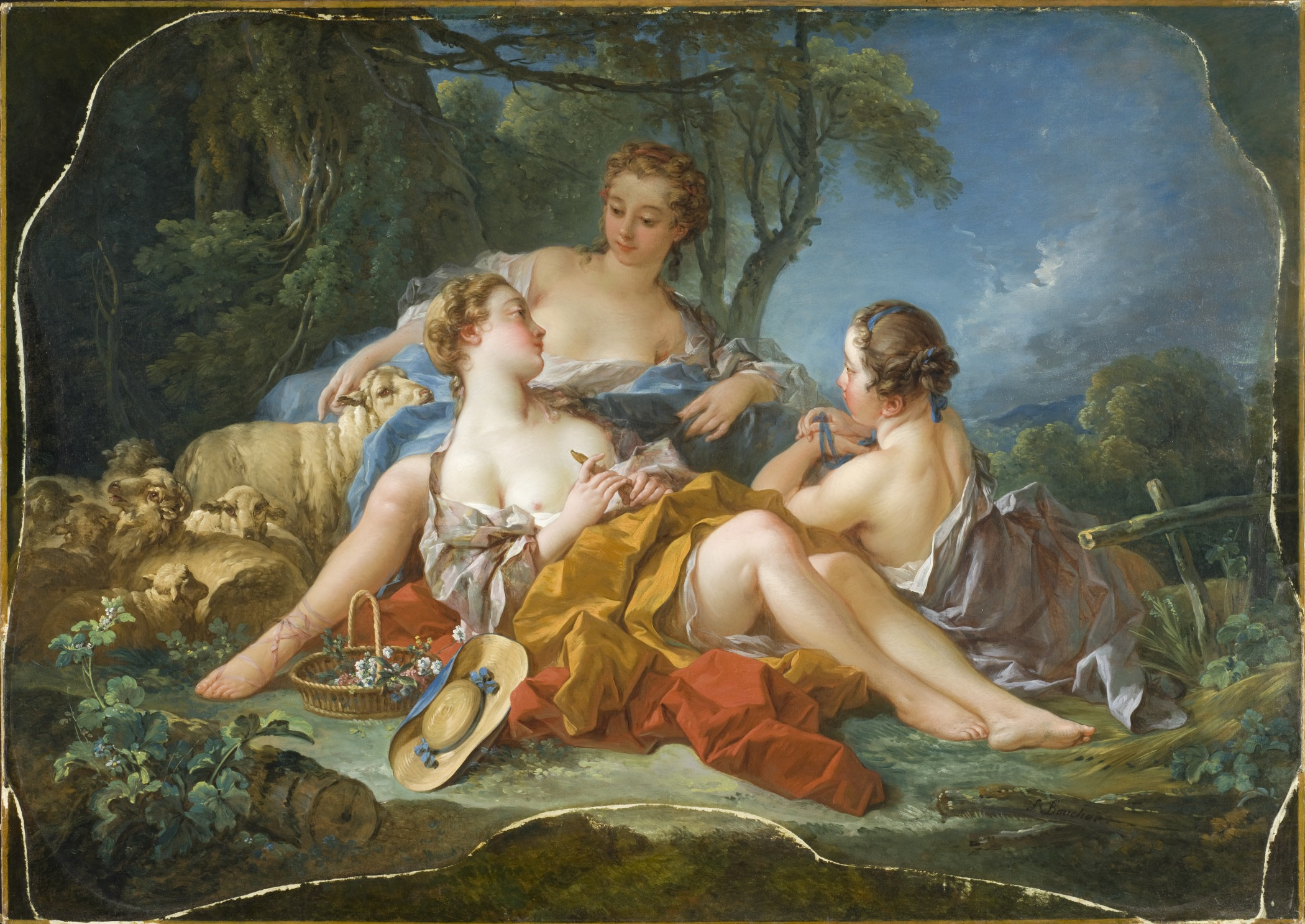
Les Confidences Pastorales

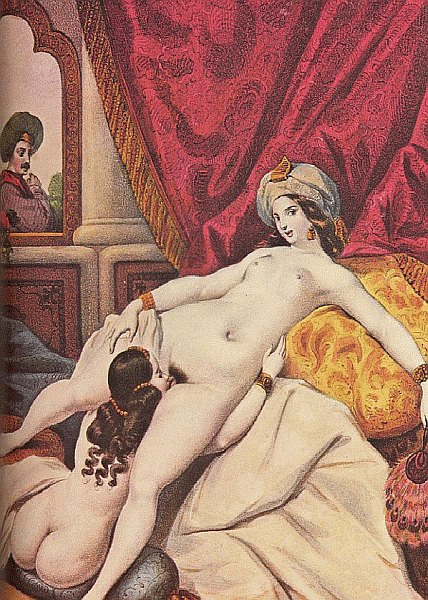
An Orientalist depiction (cunnilingus as exotica)

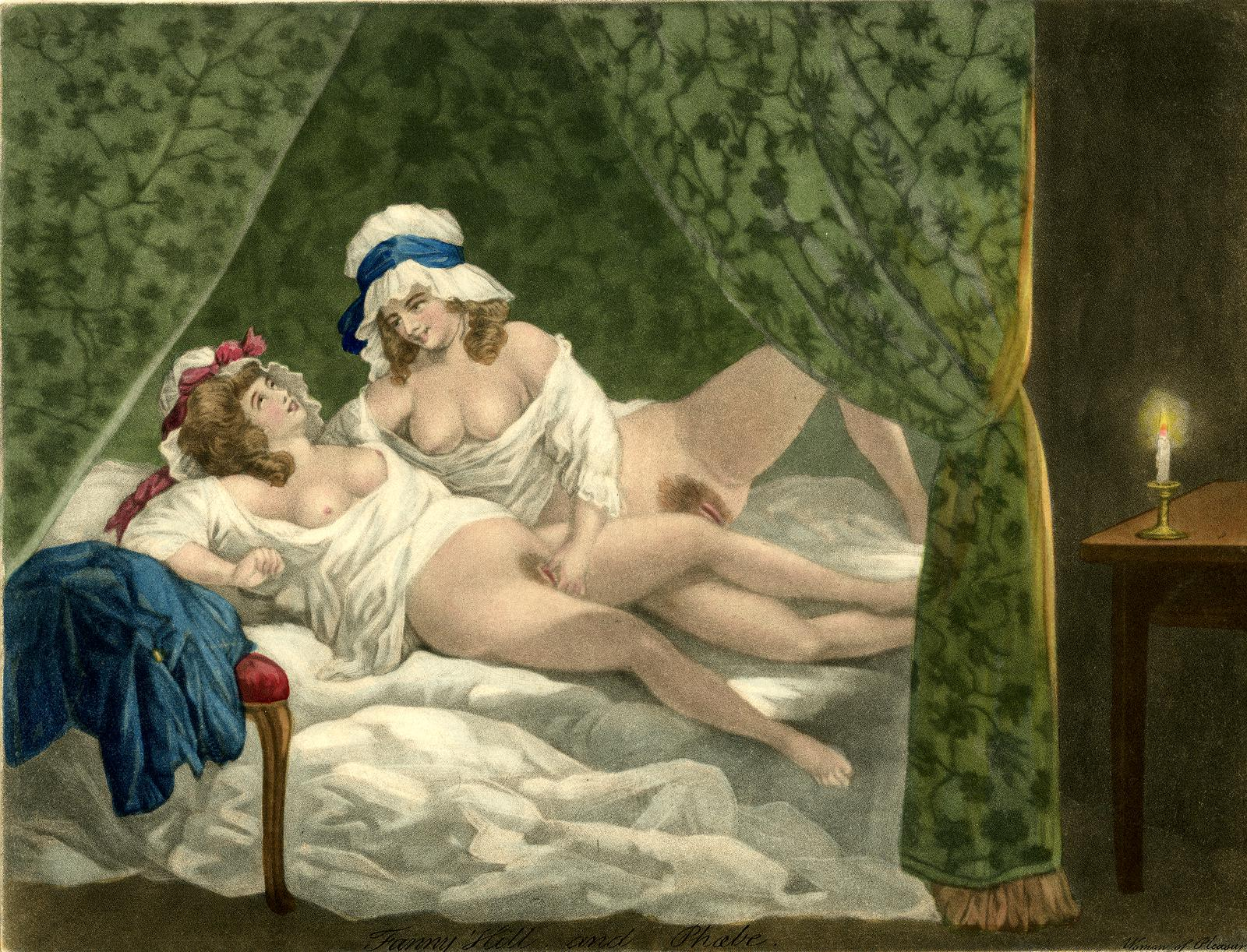
Fanny Hill and Phoebe, circa 1787

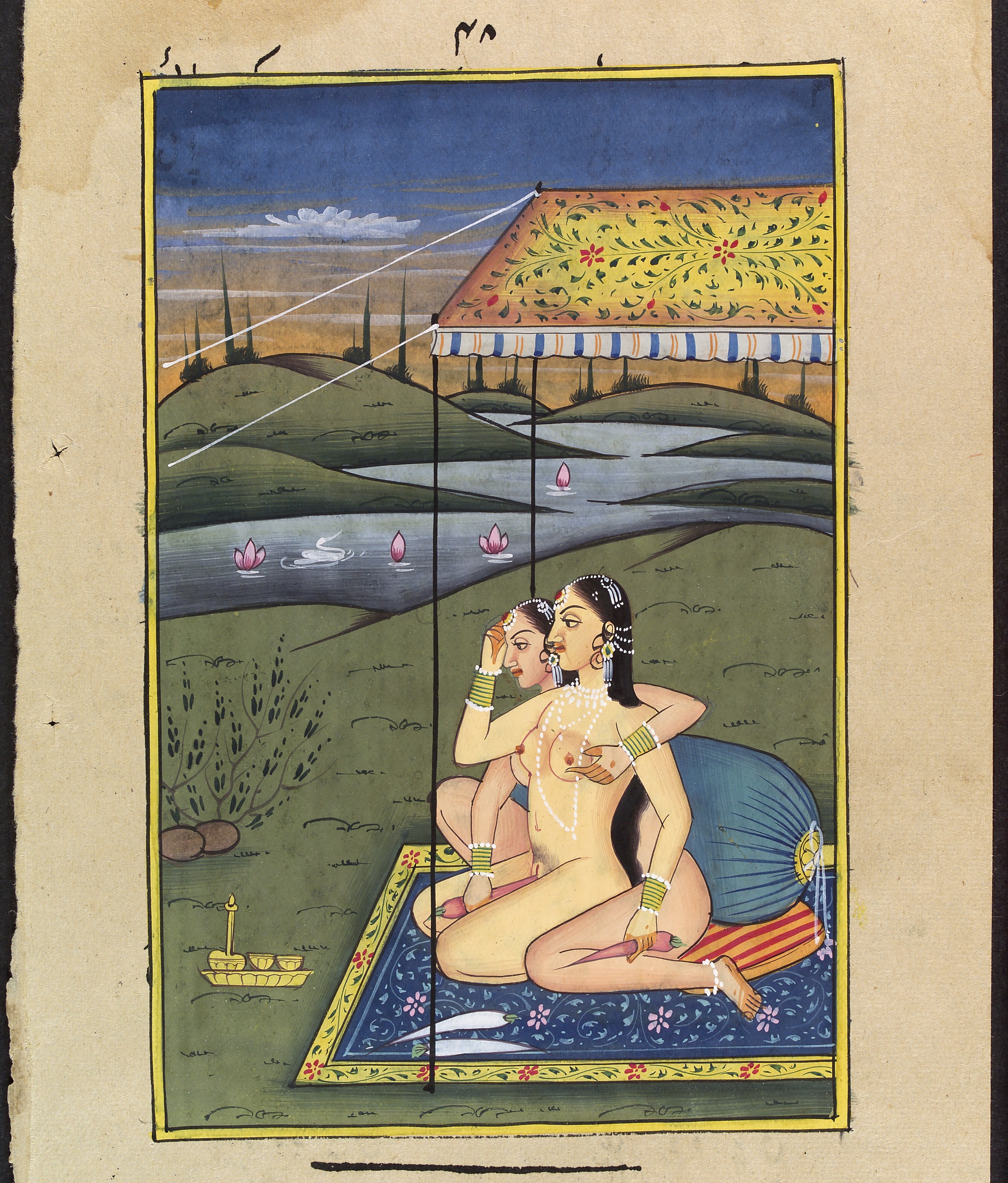
Two women embracing and using carrots as dildoes, Gouache

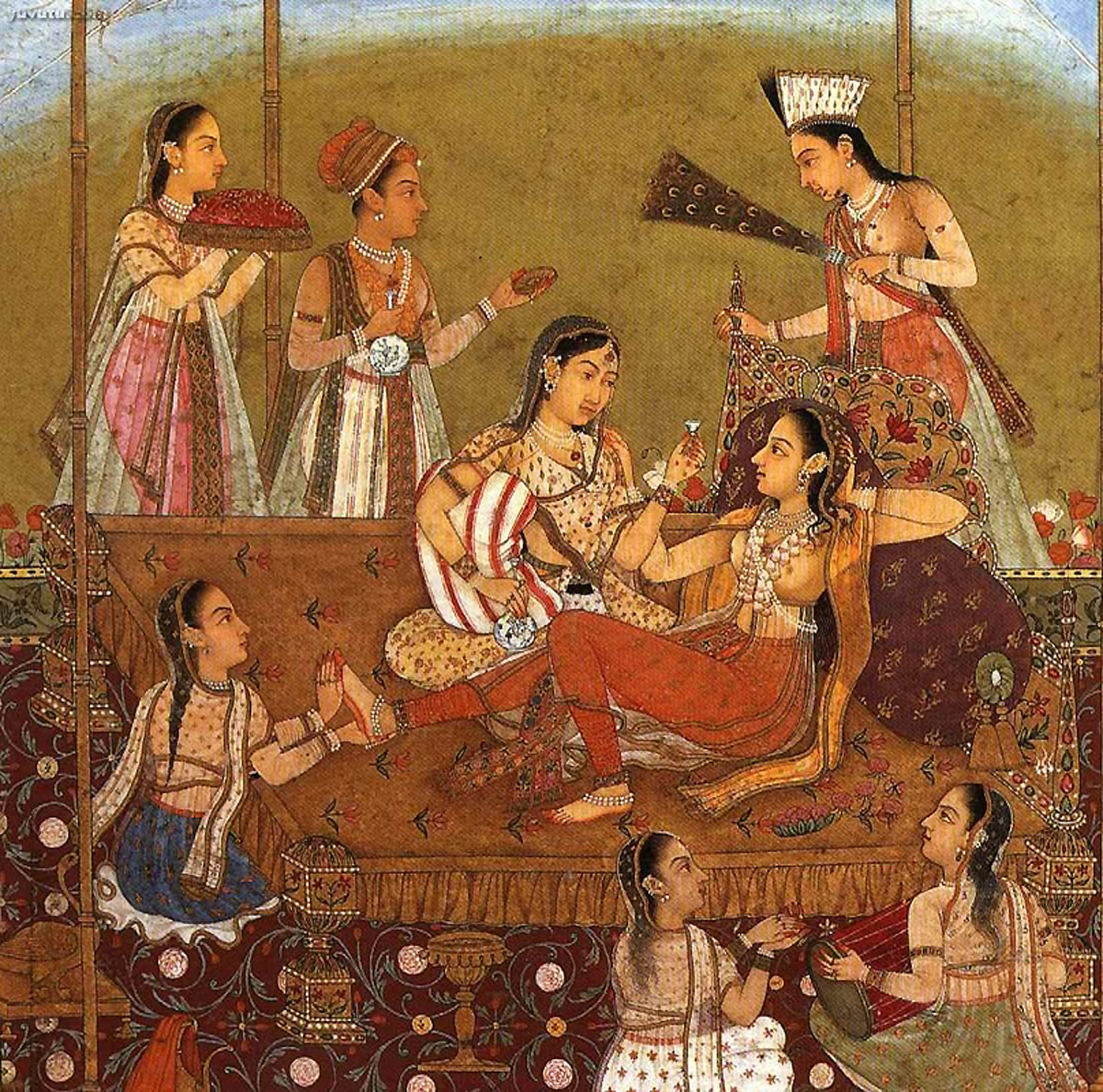
Kama Sutra lesbian

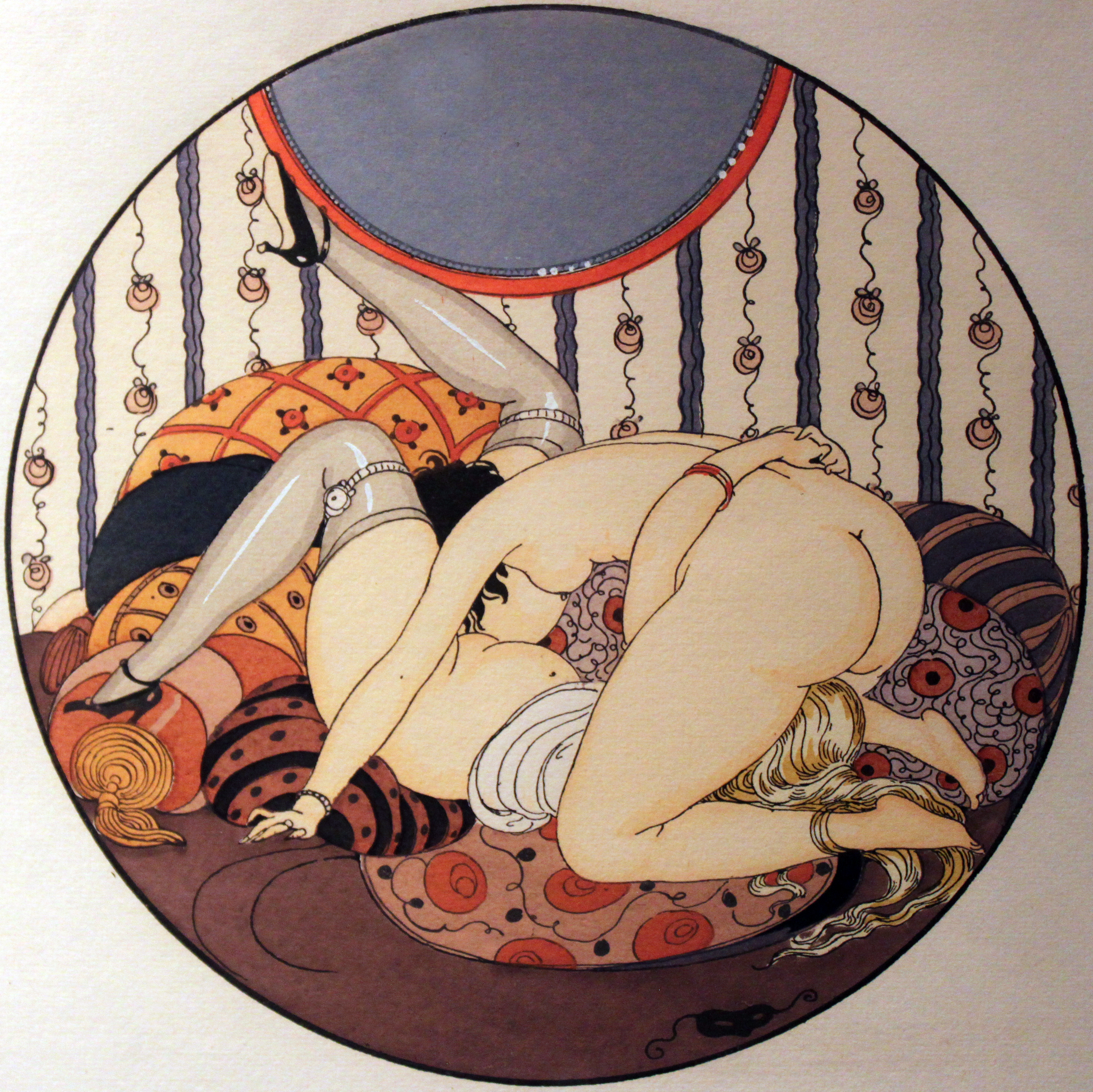
1925 Wegener Les Delassements dEros 06 anagoria

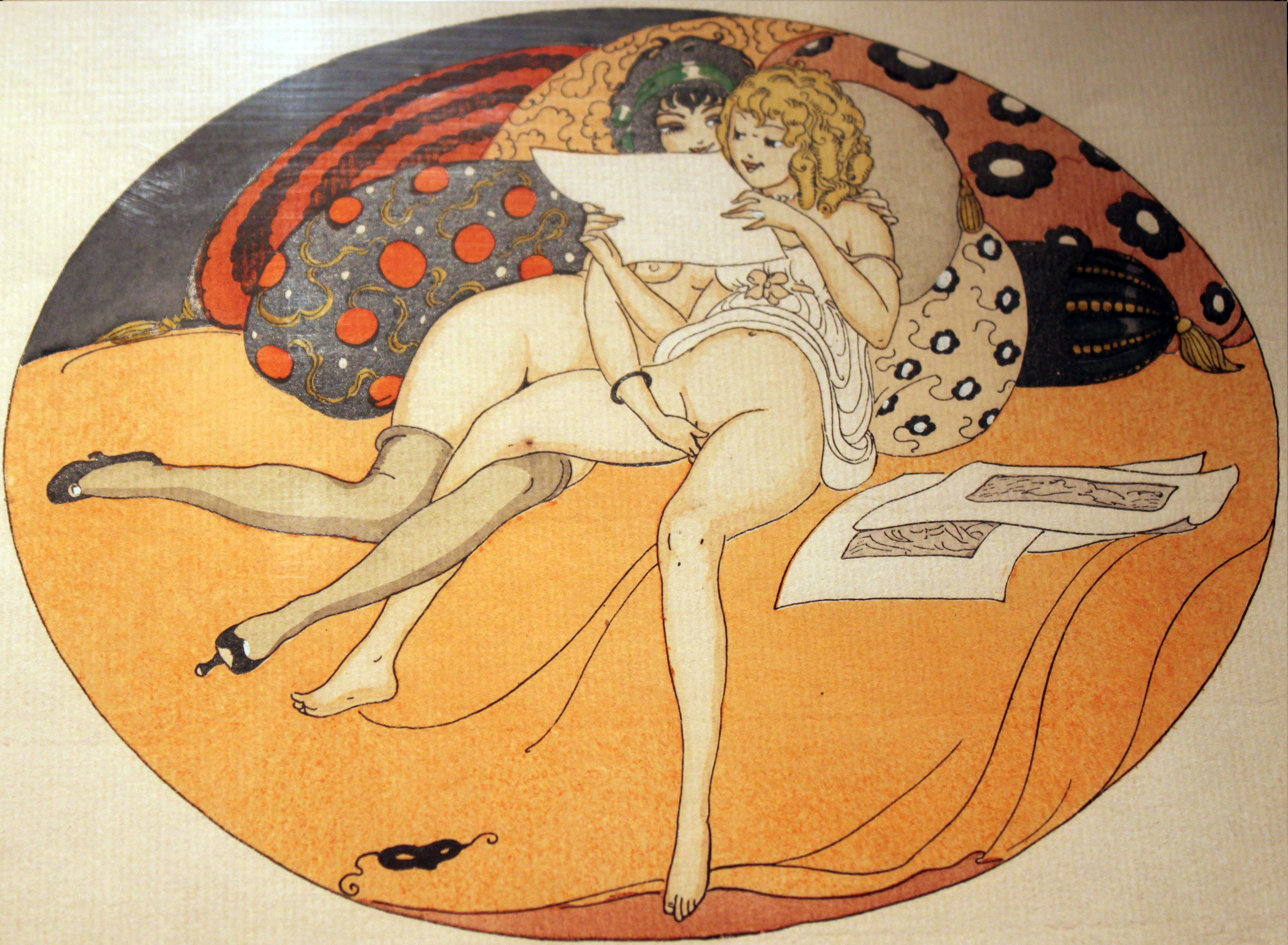
Les Délassements d'Eros, 1925

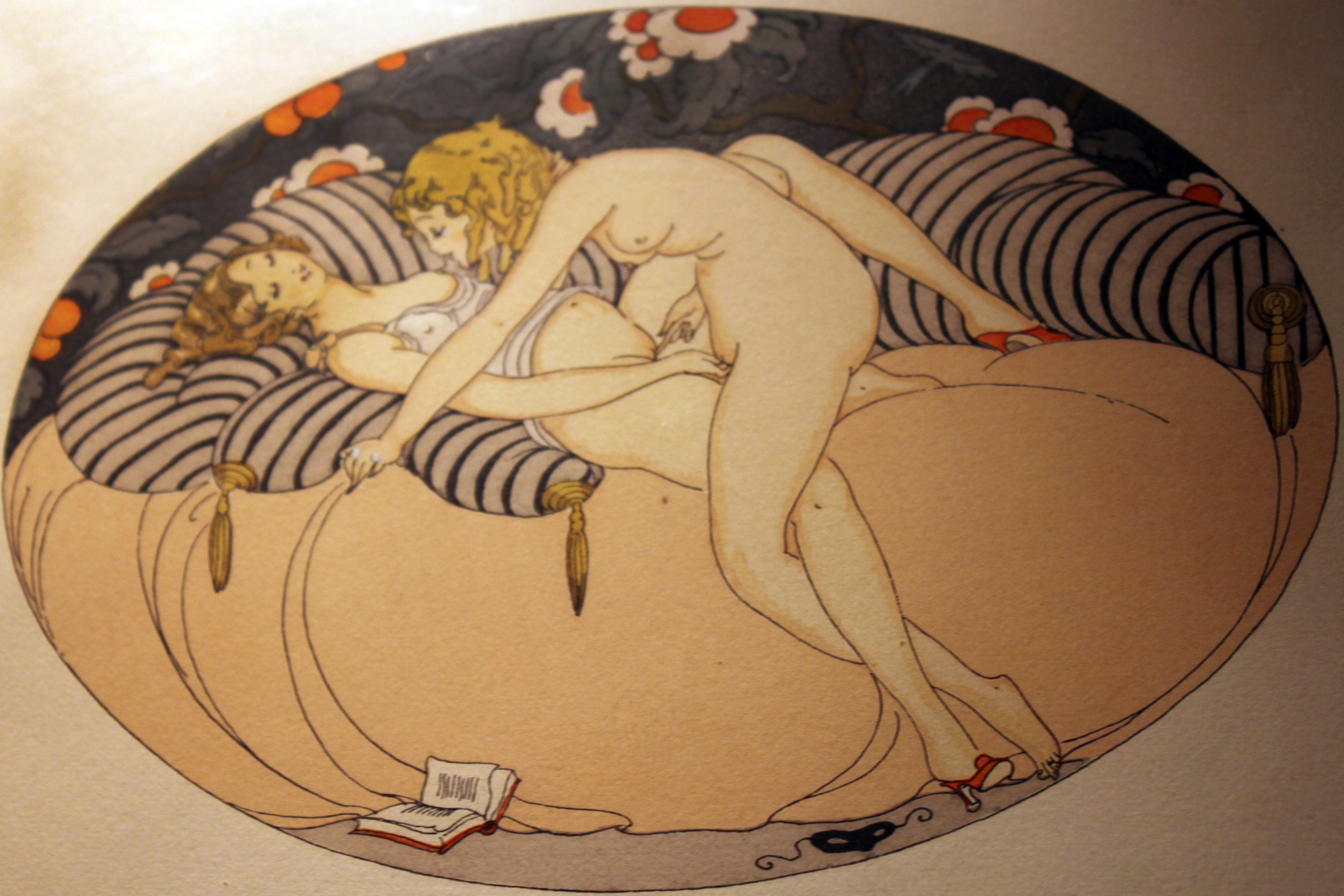
A 1925 Gerda Wegener painting of two women engaging in mutual manual stimulation

The female touch, from La Vie érotique by Paul Chenavard (1840)

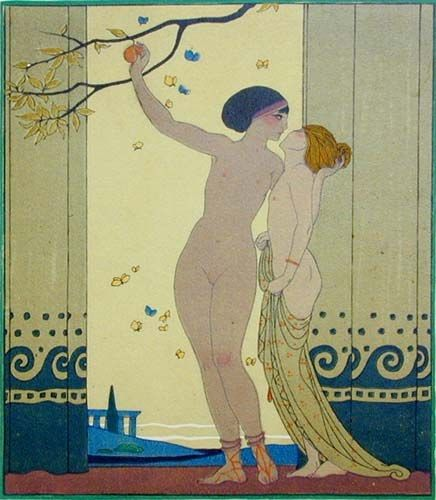
Les Chansons de Bilitis par George Barbier, 1922

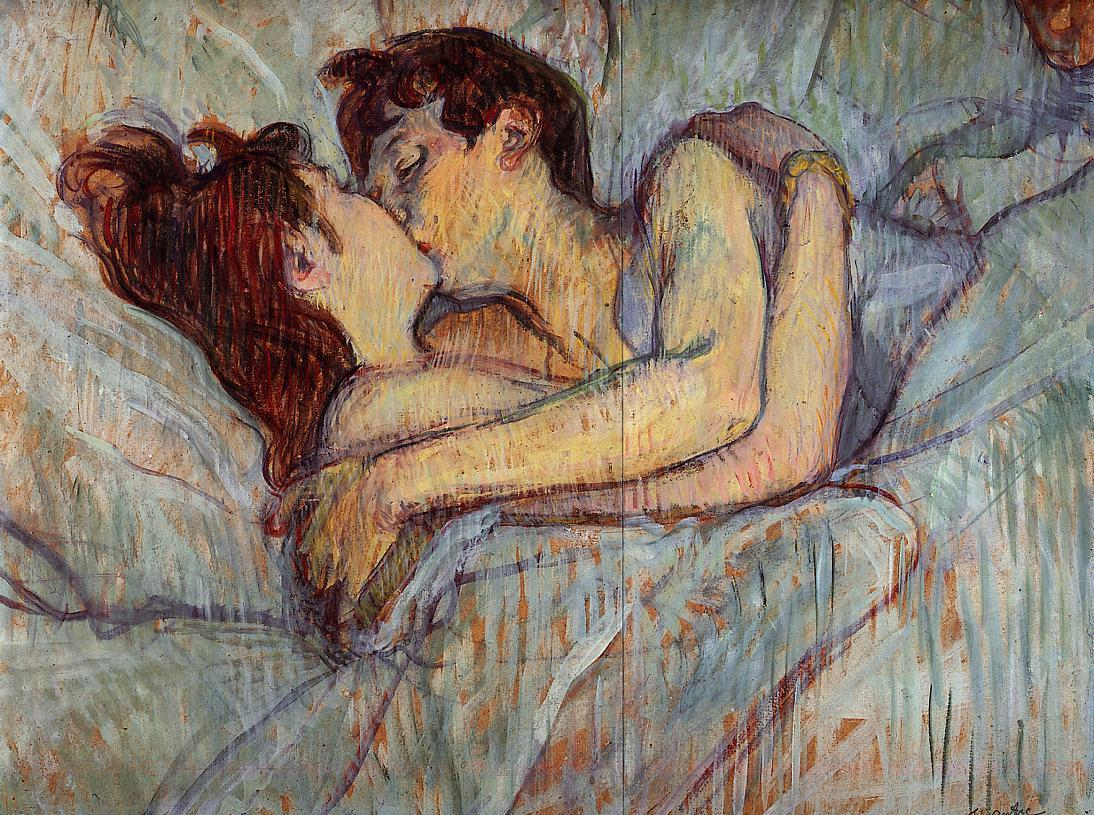
In bed - the kiss by Toulouse Lautrec

== See also ==
- Bisexual pornography
- Erotica
- Femslash
- Gay pornography – male counterpart
- History of erotic depictions
- Media portrayal of lesbianism
- Slash fiction
- Sex-positive feminism
- Women's pornography
- Yuri (genre)
