= Judy Francesconi =

American photographer

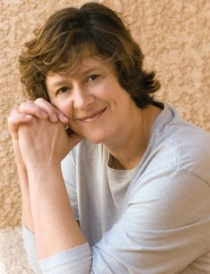
- Born: Judith Ann Francesconi; 11 May 1957 (age 69); Huntington, New York, U.S.
- Occupation: Photographer
- Years active: 1973–present
- Known for: Black-and-white fine art photography

Judy Francesconi (born May 11, 1957) is an American photographer who concentrates on black-and-white fine art photography of lesbian women.

She graduated from the University of Southern California with a degree in journalism. She is most noted for her black-and-white and sepia photography featuring beautiful (lipstick lesbian) women. Her images have appeared in galleries, books, on CDs, postcards, greeting cards, posters, and in advertising. For many years, Francesconi was the only publisher of a fine-art calendar aimed at lesbians. Her yearly calendar remains a top-seller to this day. Her first book, Stolen Moments, was published in 1997.

According to photographer Tee Corinne, the work of Francesconi "appeal[s] to those whom Barbara Grier named 'garden variety' lesbians, women making homes together, holding down jobs, not, in general, defining themselves as radical". Majority of her portrait subjects are "white, slender, able-bodied, and young". Her photographs are set against neutral background lit by studio lighting.

== Bibliography ==
- (1997) Stolen Moments. Shake It Up Productions. ISBN 978-0-9629959-1-0.
- (2000) Visual Sonnets. Shake It Up Productions. ISBN 978-0-9629959-2-7.
- (2003) Intimate Moments. Shake It Up Productions. ISBN 0-9629959-4-0.
- (2003) Passion. Shake It Up Productions. ISBN 0-9629959-3-2.
- (2004) Tenderness. 10% Productions. ISBN 978-1-931978-20-0.
- (2006) Provocateur. 10% Productions. ISBN 1-931978-53-0.
- (2008) On The Lips. Judy Francesconi Publishing. ISBN 978-0-9629959-8-9.

== See also ==
- Lesbianism in erotica

== Sources ==
- (1998) Beginnings: Lesbians Talk About the First Time They Met Their Long-Term Partner. Lindsey Elder. Alyson Publications. ISBN 978-1-55583-427-2.
- (1998) Awakening the Virgin. Nicole Foster. Alyson Publications. ISBN 978-1-55583-456-2.
- (1998) Love Shook My Heart. Irene Zahava. Alyson Publications. ISBN 978-1-55583-404-3.
- (2001) Celebrity: The Advocate Interviews. Judy Wieder. Advocate Books. ISBN 978-1-55583-722-8.
- (2002) Photography: Lesbian, Post Stonewall. An Encyclopedia of Gay, Lesbian, Bisexual, Transgender, & Queer Culture.
- (2003) The Lesbian Sex Book: A Guide for Women Who Love Women. Wendy Caster, Rachel Kramer Bussel, and Julie May. Alyson Books. ISBN 978-1-55583-744-0.
- (2004) Subjects of the Visual Arts: Nude Females An Encyclopedia of Gay, Lesbian, Bisexual, Transgender, & Queer Culture.
- (2006) Things - Now, Then & Strange. Kelly A. Morris. Trafford Publishing. ISBN 978-1-4120-3078-6.
- (2007) Secret Lives of Women, Episode: Lipstick Lesbians. Women's Entertainment Television, WE TV.
- interview
