= Louis Marie De Schryver =

French artist (1862–1942)

Louis Marie de Schryver
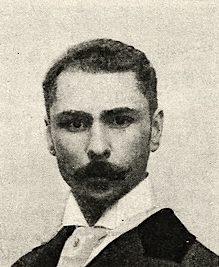
- Louis Marie de Schryver
- Born: 12 October 1862 or 13 October 1862; Paris, France
- Died: 6 December 1942 (aged 80); Paris, France
- Known for: Painting
- Movement: Belle Époque
- Awards: Gold Medal, Universal Exhibition of 1900; 2nd Class Medal, Paris Salon of 1892; 2nd Class Medal, Paris Salon of 1896; 3rd Class Medal, Paris Salon of 1891; 3rd Class Medal, Paris Salon of 1890; Honorable Mention, Paris Salon of 1889; Honorable Mention, Paris Salon of 1886; Bronze Medal, World's Fair of Sydney, 1879

Louis Marie de Schryver (12 or 13 October 1862 – 6 December 1942) was a French painter known for his depictions of Parisian life during the Belle Époque, of which he was a prominent chronicler.

== Biography ==
=== Early life and background ===
Louis Marie de Schryver was born on 12 (or 13) October 1862 in Paris into a wealthy bourgeois family. His father, a journalist, supported Louis's artistic ambitions from a young age. Growing up in an affluent household, de Schryver was exposed to the sophisticated culture of Paris, which was later to become the primary subject of his artistic work.

From an early age, de Schryver demonstrated a natural talent for drawing and painting. His training began at the age of 12. At the age of 13, he exhibited his first work at the Paris Salon in 1876, an achievement that immediately drew attention to his skills.

=== Artistic development and education ===
Though he did not receive formal training in an established art academy, de Schryver benefited from private mentorship and interactions with leading artists of his time. He is known to have studied, albeit briefly, under Philippe Rousseau and was also a pupil of Gabriel Ferrier.

Influenced by the academic style of the 19th century, his early works emphasized precision and realistic details. Author Gérald Schurr praised de Schryver's Parisian scenes as being "often bathed in a light of rare subtlety."

== Artistic career ==
De Schryver's career spanned more than five decades, during which he gained recognition as a prominent painter of the Belle Époque Paris. Street scenes and people of the city were popular subjects of the time, and de Schryver was interested in capturing upper class and life on Parisian streets. Recurring themes in his paintings included elegant Parisians, horses and carriages, and working people, such as flower vendors, street sweepers, and washers.

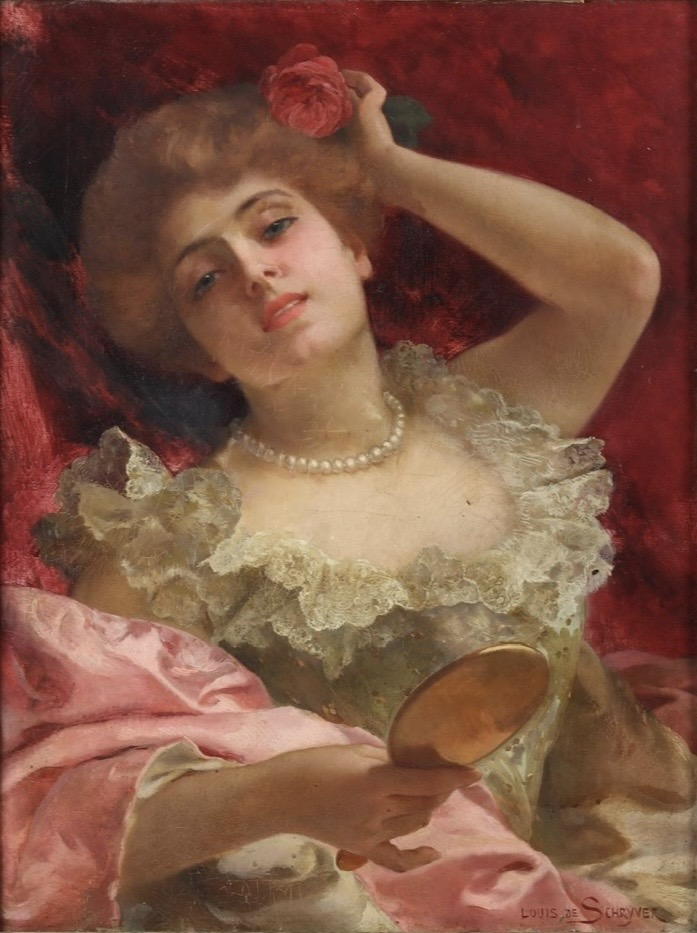
Femme avec rose rose (ca.1902), by Louis Marie de Schryver

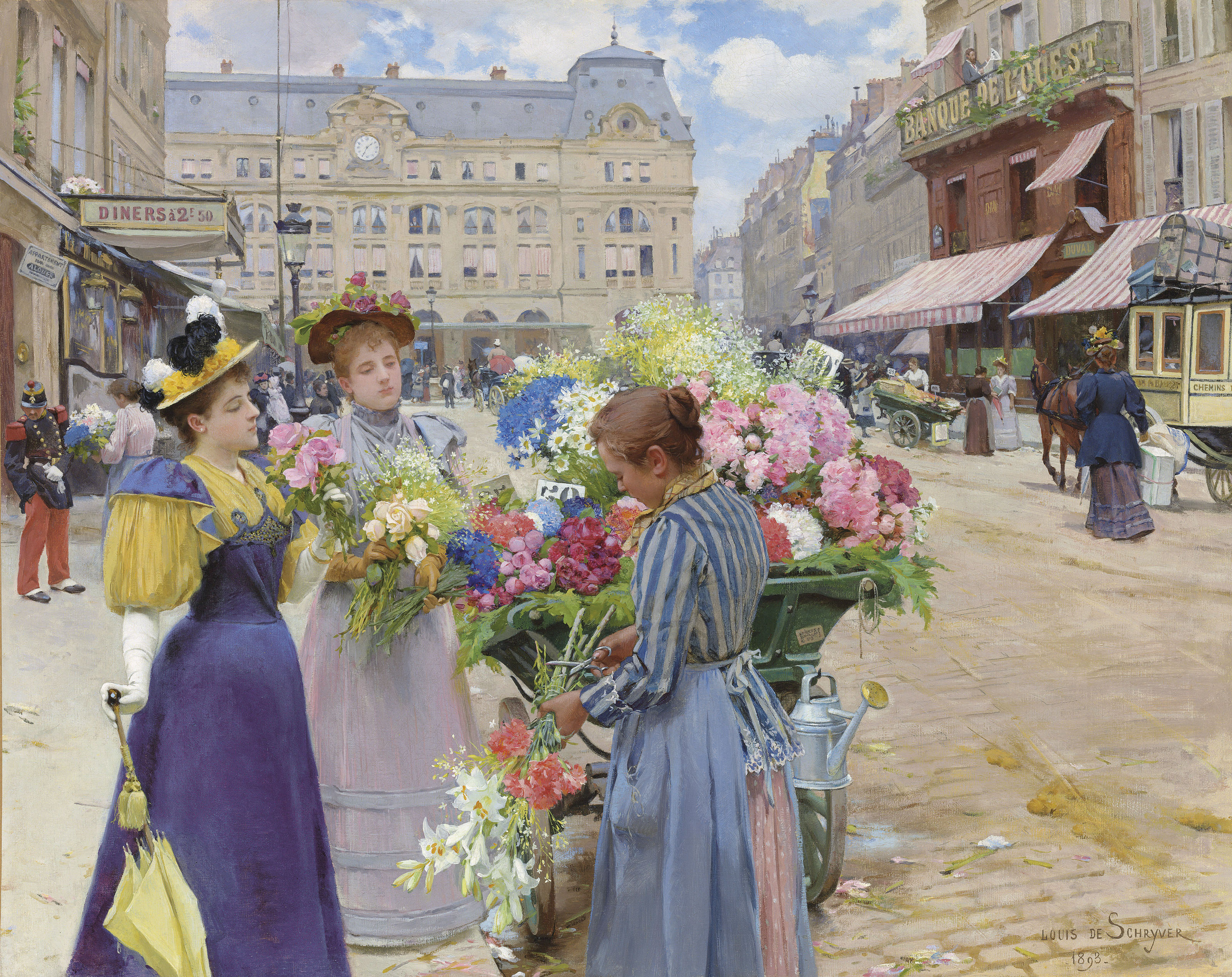
Marchand de fleurs, la rue du Havre, Paris (1893), by Louis Marie de Schryver

=== Signature themes ===
De Schryver's main artistic themes include:

- Flower markets: De Schryver's work often portrays Parisian flower markets, capturing the textures and colors of flowers, juxtaposed with the movement and energy of the busy marketplaces.
- Portraits of women: De Schryver painted several portraits of fashionable Parisian women, which demonstrate his ability to render intricate details such as lace, fabric, and floral embellishments.
- Cityscapes and urban life: His paintings of urban settings capture the architecture, horse-drawn carriages and thestreets of Paris.

=== Exhibitions and awards ===
De Schryver exhibited at the Paris Salon throughout his life. At 17 years old, he won a bronze medal at the World's Fair of Sydney for his painting entitled "Lilas" (Lilacs). He received numerous medals at the Universal Exhibition and Paris Salons.

== Auction records and legacy ==
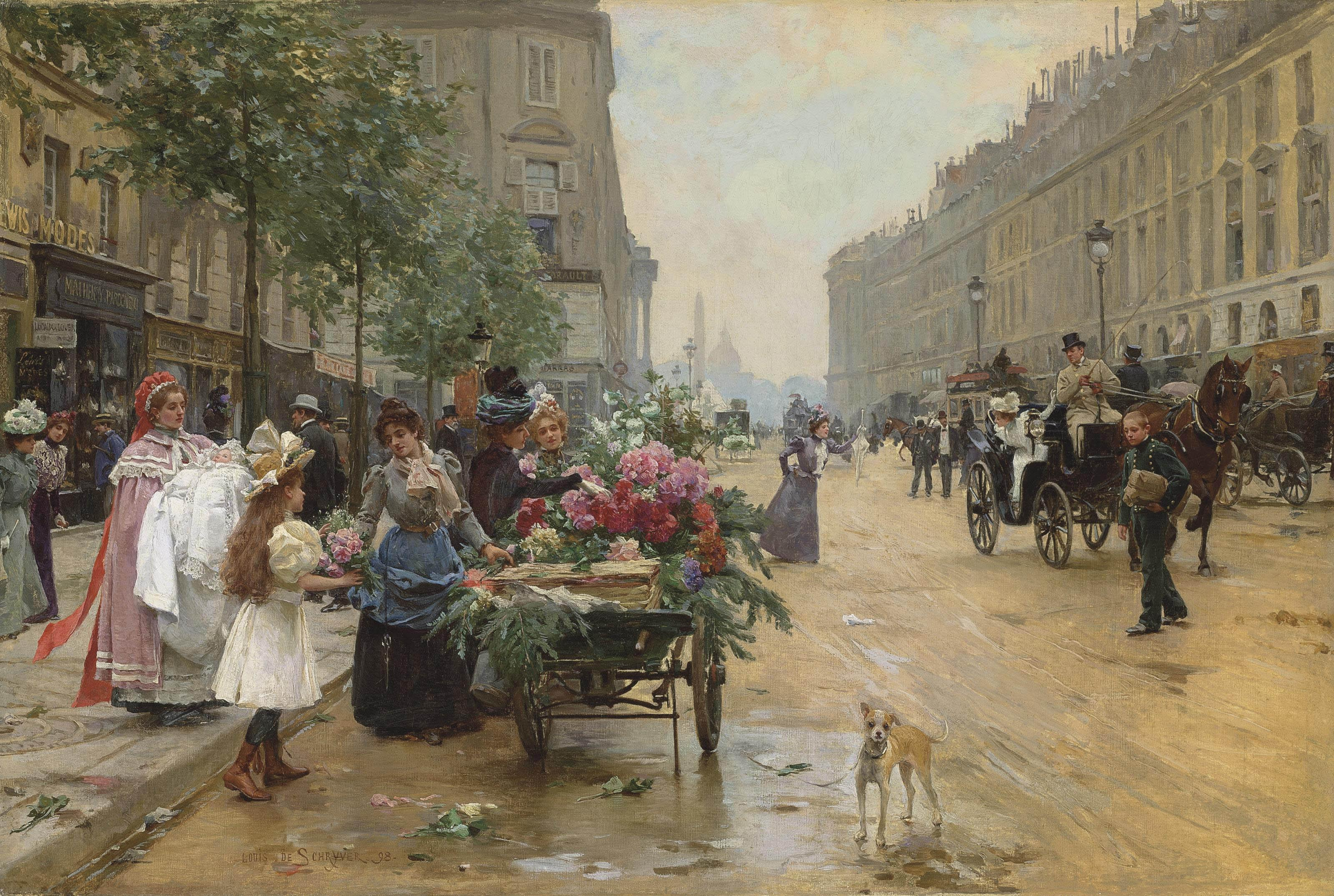
Rue Royale, Paris (1898), by Louis Marie de Schryver

De Schryver's works have continued to attract significant attention in the art market. His painting Rue Royale, Paris sold for $662,500 at Christie's in 2012. His portraits are highly regarded for their elegance and detail.

== Later life and death ==
In his later years, de Schryver's painting style was influenced by Impressionism, and he began painting automobiles. When these paintings found little success in the art market, he returned to the more popular Parisian scenes. He continued to paint, though his output diminished as modernist movements like Cubism rose to prominence.

He died in Paris on December 6, 1942 at the age of 80.

== Notable works ==
- Le Marché aux fleurs sur le Pont Marie (The Flower Market on the Pont Marie)
- Bouquetière sur les Champs-Élysées (Flower Seller on the Champs-Élysées)
- Les Bouquinistes sur les quais de Seine (Booksellers on the Banks of the Seine)
- Rue Royale, Paris (1898) – Achieved a price of $662,500 at Christie's New York in 2012
- La Marchande de Fleurs – Rue de Rivoli (Flower Seller - Rue de Rivoli) (1892)
