= House of the Small Fountain =

Roman townhouse in Pompeii

- Casa della Fontana Piccola
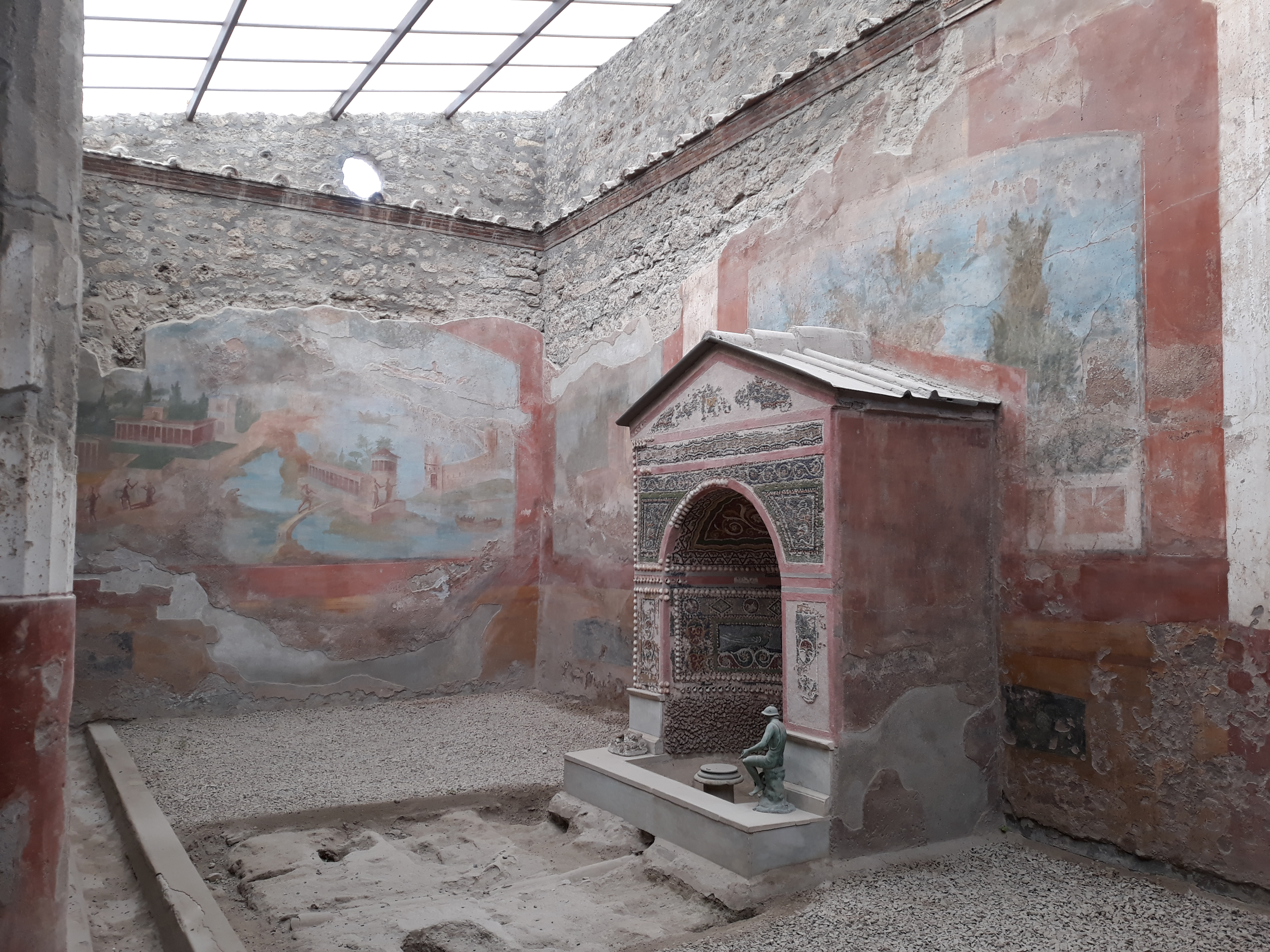
- Pseudo-peristyle with mosaic fountain in the House of the Small Fountain
- Interactive map of the House of the Small Fountain area

General information
- Status: archaeological remains
- Architectural style: Roman fauces-atrium-tablinum matrix
- Classification: Townhouse
- Location: Pompeii, Roman Empire, VI, 8, 23.24, Via di Mercurio, 80045 Pompei, Italy, Pompei, Italy
- Coordinates: 40°45′05″N 14°29′01″E
- Current tenants: 0
- Construction started: 2nd century BCE
- Renovated: 62
- Destroyed: 79

Technical details
- Material: opus incertum, opus reticulatum

Design and construction
- Known for: pseudo-peristyle with temple-style tile and shell mosaic fountain

Other information
- Number of rooms: 29 (lower floor)

The House of the Small Fountain (Casa della Fontana Piccola, VI.8.23), aka House of the Second Fountain or House of the Landscapes, is located in the Roman city of Pompeii and, with the rest of Pompeii, was preserved by the eruption of Mount Vesuvius in or after October 79 CE. It is located on the Via di Mercurio, a street running north from the Arch of Caligula, at its crossroads with Via delle Terme, and Via della Fortuna, to Pompeii's fortification tower XI in the northwest part of the city. The street is named after a public fountain at VI.8.24 with a relief of the god, Mercury. Insula 8 is on the west side of the street. The house is named after a mosaic fountain adorned with shells at the rear of its peristyle. The property is immediately adjacent to the House of the Large Fountain (VI 8,22,1), a structure with an even larger mosaic fountain adorned with shells and marble sculptures of theatrical masks excavated earlier in 1826. So the size difference between the fountains was used to distinguish the two structures.

== Social context ==
In addition to the House of the Large Fountain, other significant structures nearby included the lavishly decorated fullonica and House of L. Veranius Hypsaeus with its stately, pillared atrium where frescoes depicting the cleaning process were found. Across the street is the House of the Five Skeletons, sometimes known as Cassandra's Vatican House, decorated with scenes of characters from the Iliad, The House of Pomponius with remains of an oil press, and the multilevel House of the Anchor with its expansive lower garden accessed through numerous arched entrances. Sprinkled between the grander residences are shops and thermopolia, some with residences attached. The proximity of other upper merchant-class homes created a nexus for social activities for the residents of the House of the Small Fountain within their appropriate social class.

The presence of the fullonica as well as the shops with residences attached suggests a diverse workforce in the neighborhood that included women and children.

"...paintings from fullonica VI 8, 20–21.2 at Pompeii show men, women and children performing various tasks related to the fulling process (Fröhlich 1991; Clarke 2003). Three women and a girl are shown performing relatively light tasks in the finishing phase, such as checking the quality of the work done and folding clothes, while three of the four stall workers seem to be little boys." As family-based businesses, including the fullonica built into an atrium-style house, two or more generations may have worked side by side. Within the fullonica workshop, though, ultimately the division of labor based on different responsibilities determined the social status of groups or individuals within the work environment.

The presence of the public fountain just outside entrance 24 would have also produced a gathering place for all local residents and a communications hub for the immediate vicinity.

== Construction ==
The house was originally two Samnite period structures merged during the Roman period to create a double atrium house. Remnants of stairs in both fauces and in the service wing attest to the existence at one time of an upper floor. At the time of the eruption, the home was being repaired because of damage sustained in the earthquake of 62 CE.

The exterior walls of the merged structures primarily consist of opus incertum supported by limestone ashlar pillars except at the southern end where the opus incertum leans against the tufa ashlar facade of the Casa della Fontana Grande. Up to an average height of 3 meters, the opus incertum consists of black lava. Limestone chunks compose the material above that height. An exception is west of a recess outside Room 15 where the opus incertum becomes almost pure limestone with few lava fragments. The western end of the facade is supported by a pillar of opus mixtum with a repeating pattern of two rows of brick between one row of ashlars made of Sarno lime and tuff.

== Excavation history ==
Although part of the facade of the house may have been exposed in December 1826 while work progressed on the House of the Large Fountain, the earnest excavation of the House of the Small Fountain did not begin until February 1827 and continued in March and April. Records from finds in the atrium (2) area are dated April 13, 1827. By May 1, atrium (2), fauces (1), staircase (28), cubicula (3) and (9), tablinum (8) and corridor (16) were exposed. The peristyle had been discovered but not yet cleared. By May 29, 1827, excavators had cleared all rooms west of the atrium.

On June 5, 1827, a show excavation was staged for Francesco I and the royal family in which the mosaic fountain with its statuary was revealed in the peristyle. Finds recorded in the Pompeianarum Antiquitatum Historia (PAH) indicate the excavators finished clearing the exposed rooms and contents in the following months. Excavations of the small annexed house at entrance 24 and the rooms on the north side of the peristyle did not begin until September 14, 1827. When the king visited again at the end of October, he was shown additional finds from the house. The last finds were recorded on November 5 and 6 and a complete plan of the house was submitted to the Real Museo Borbonico IV.

German archaeologists Thomas Frolich and Volker Michael Strocka, in their publication "Häuser in Pompeji: Band 8: Casa della fontana piccola" (VI 8, 23.24), point out that some previous scholars misinterpreted later reports in the PAH dated August 20, 1839, claiming additional excavations took place in the "della nuova fontana a musaico". Citing Margareta Staub-Gierow they state, "in 1839 the nuova fontana no longer meant the fountain of the Casa della Fontana Piccola, but rather that of the Casa del Granduca, Pompeji VII 4,56, which had been discovered in 1833." Soon after excavations were completed in 1827, modern roofing was constructed over rooms 7, 9, 10, 19, 24 and 25 that contained paintings deemed worthy of preservation. A thorough restoration in 1971 provided all rooms with modern concrete ceilings and both atriums received modern roofing. The ancient walls had to be fortified to support the additional weight and this work resulted in the loss of their original surface. The 19th century roof over the garden that had sparked controversy was removed but this action exposed the landscape paintings to the elements. So in 1985–86, a new protective roof of polycarbonate was rebuilt over the garden, all paintings restored, and the fountain repaired.

== Layout and decoration ==
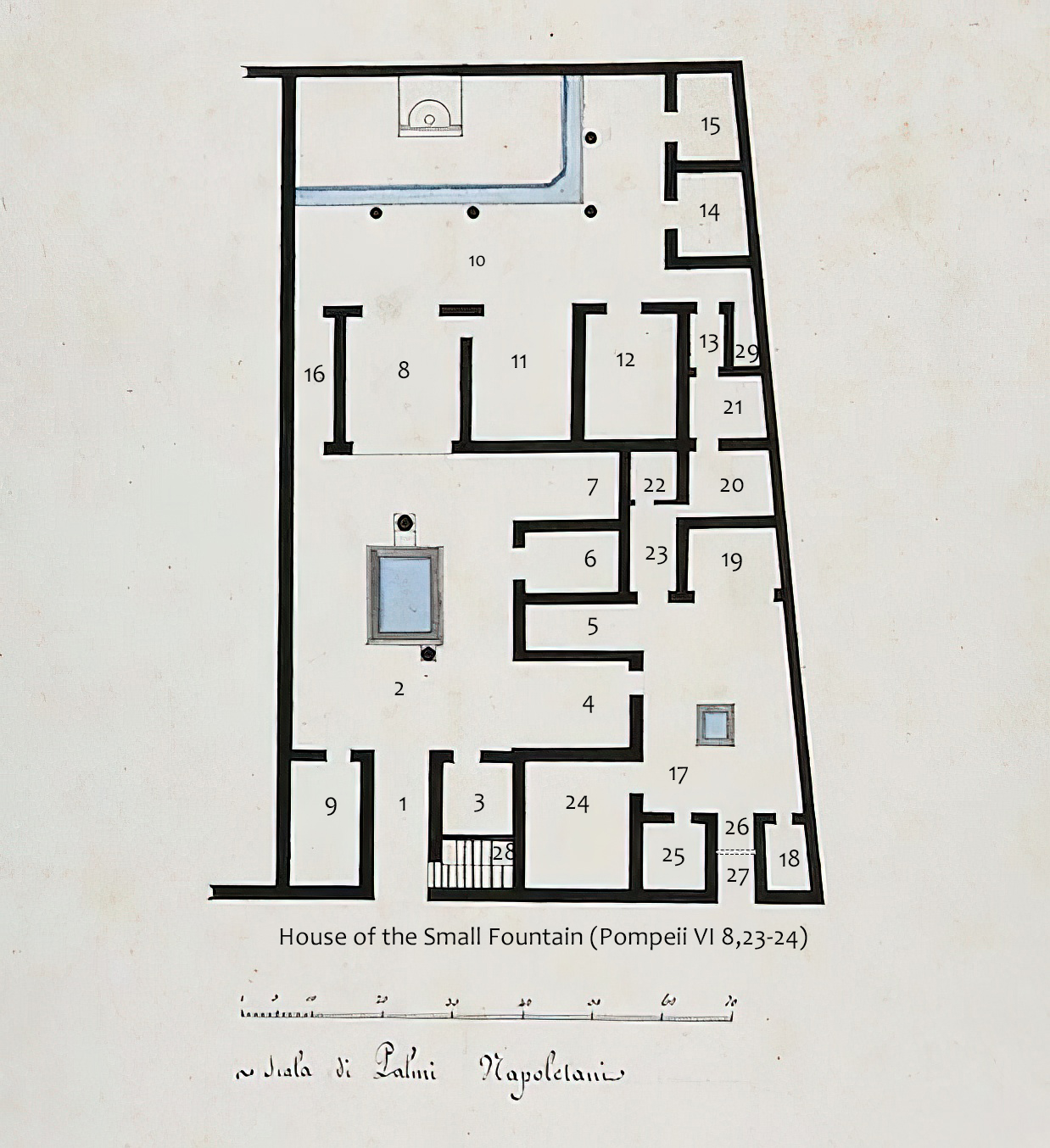
Floor plan of the House of the Small Fountain by Carlo Bonucci dated 9 October 1828 with numbering from Frohlich and Strocka added

Fauces – Entrance 23 (1): The fauces, once secured from the street by a double-leaf door, is paved with gray lava pesto studded with regular rows of white almost square tesserae. Its plastered walls were decorated in the Fourth Style with a black dado, red-paneled middle zone and a white upper zone. Only traces of small flowers, a large candelabra and hints of architectural framework remain. On the right side near entrance 23 are stairs leading to an upper floor.

Atrium – (2): The Tuscan-style atrium, with impluvium, fountain, and puteal (well head), is paved with gray lava pesto matching that of fauces (1). The floor appears to have been cut after it was laid and marble thresholds were installed for adjoining rooms. Wall plaster is fragmented but was painted in the Fourth Style. A red dado is topped by a middle zone featuring red panels with white border stripes on a yellow ground. Two floating pairs of dancing satyrs and maenads once copied by 19th century architect Niccolini are now no longer visible.

Room 3: Plastered, barrel-vaulted chamber decorated in the Fourth Style with white ground middle and upper zone over a red dado. It is paved with fine gray lava chips with slightly larger red brick pieces in a geometric pattern. Small white tesserae form a carpet of not quite regular hexagons. In the center of each hexagon is a cross star consisting of four white and one central black stone. This small room may have served as a vestibule for waiting visitors. According to Fausto and Felice Niccolini writing in 1854, the walls were once decorated with architectural elements and floating figures of dancing fauns and Bacchantes on a red ground. (See drawings by 19th century Swiss artist Frauenfelder.)

Room 4: This chamber provides access to both Atriums, 2 and 17, of the integrated structure. A wide door at the west end of the north wall opens into Atrium 17 while the room itself opens full width into Atrium 2. The room was last paved with gray lava pesto with brick inclusions. A little north of the center of the room is a square arrangement of granite slabs from Egypt, Turkey, the island of Elba, and north Africa. Scholars suggest the larger slabs are Egyptian "granito bianco e nero" (black and white) and "granitello bigio" (gray) from Elba. They think the smaller slabs are white-purple pavonazzetto from Asia Minor and yellow "giallo antico" from Tunisia. Plaster was once decorated in the Fourth Style, but colors have almost completely faded although traces appear to remain of a red base and white middle and upper zones with delimiting stripes and faint traces of palmettes and rosettes.

Room 5: Storage room with access from Atrium 17; the original smooth layer of the pavement is not preserved. The existing floor is now a layer of a highly calcareous, light gray, crumbly screed lying on a bedding of brick and plaster rubble. The walls have retained only remnants of plaster including a pink base with a white zone above it.

Room 6: Storage room with access from Atrium 2; the walls were plastered and painted with a red dado with a white zone above it, although only fragments remain. Rows of square holes indicate there was once shelving. Exposed masonry reveals the walls were constructed of opus vittatum mixtum with repeating layers of two brick courses and one ashlar course of limestone and tuff. The original smooth layer of pavement no longer exists. The exposed flooring is a coarse, light gray, strongly calcareous screed.

Room 7 – Ala: the south wall is completely open to Atrium 2. Exposed construction reveals the remaining walls are composed of opus incertum in the western section until an opus vittatum mixtum structure begins near the west corner with repeating layers of two brick and one ashlar courses. The floor pavement is divided into a northern and southern section. The plastered north wall facing a visitor from the atrium 2 entrance is decorated in the Fourth Style with an ochre dado with floral elements and peacocks and white ground middle and upper zones embellished with architectural structures populated by human figures. The central floating figure is a female, possibly a deity (Ceres?), holding a staff. In the left upper zone a woman with a lyre peers down from a balcony decorated with a small landscape panel painting. In the right upper zone a woman with a ewer and serving tray also peers down from a balcony decorated with a small landscape panel painting. The central figure in the upper zone appears to be a garlanded female with serving tray above a small panel painting of a sieve and sheaf of grain. (see gallery)

A floating figure on the east wall, bearing her signature torch, is Ceres, goddess of agriculture and fertility. Both the east and west walls continue the scheme of an ochre dado with white ground middle and upper zones decorated with architectural frames and aediculae containing nude satyrs as well as fluttering swans and candelabras. Both east and west dados have small landscape panel paintings and images of birds.

Room 8 – Tablinum: this tablinum has a full-width eastern entrance into atriium (2). A doorway in the west wall provides direct access to the peristyle garden (10). The atrium floor is slightly lower than the floor within the tablinum so a marble step bridges the difference and is decorated with a marble relief. At the center of the relief is a bearded head with Ammon-like curled horns. Acanthus leaves and flowers extend to the left and right. The room's pavement is a black and white mosaic. The center portion has been replaced in modern times. It is bordered by an ancient meander pattern that has been patched by restorationists. The plastered walls are badly faded. They appear to have been decorated in the Fourth Style with a yellow-ground base, a red-ground middle zone interspersed with white ground panels. The middle panel of the south wall retains a barely perceptible sea monster moving to the left but its head turned to the right preceded by a diving dolphin. The PAH indicates images in other fields were small pictures of birds and fruits.

Room 9: Barrel-vaulted chamber with plastered walls, topped with a once colorful stucco cornice, decorated in the Fourth Style with white-ground middle and upper zones over a red dado. Fields are defined by paintings of architectural elements interspersed with aediculae topped with mythological creatures. In the center panels of the north and south walls are floating landscape paintings. The left and right panels feature small scenes with animals including cavorting goats, birds, and panthers, typical Bacchic iconography. The upperzone includes small landscape panel paintings. The red dado is embellished with green and yellow floral elements. The room is paved with coarse-grained gray lava pesto punctuated by an opus sectile mosaic in the center of the room consisting of seven rows of colorful marble running in an east–west direction.

== Gallery: Rooms 1–9 ==
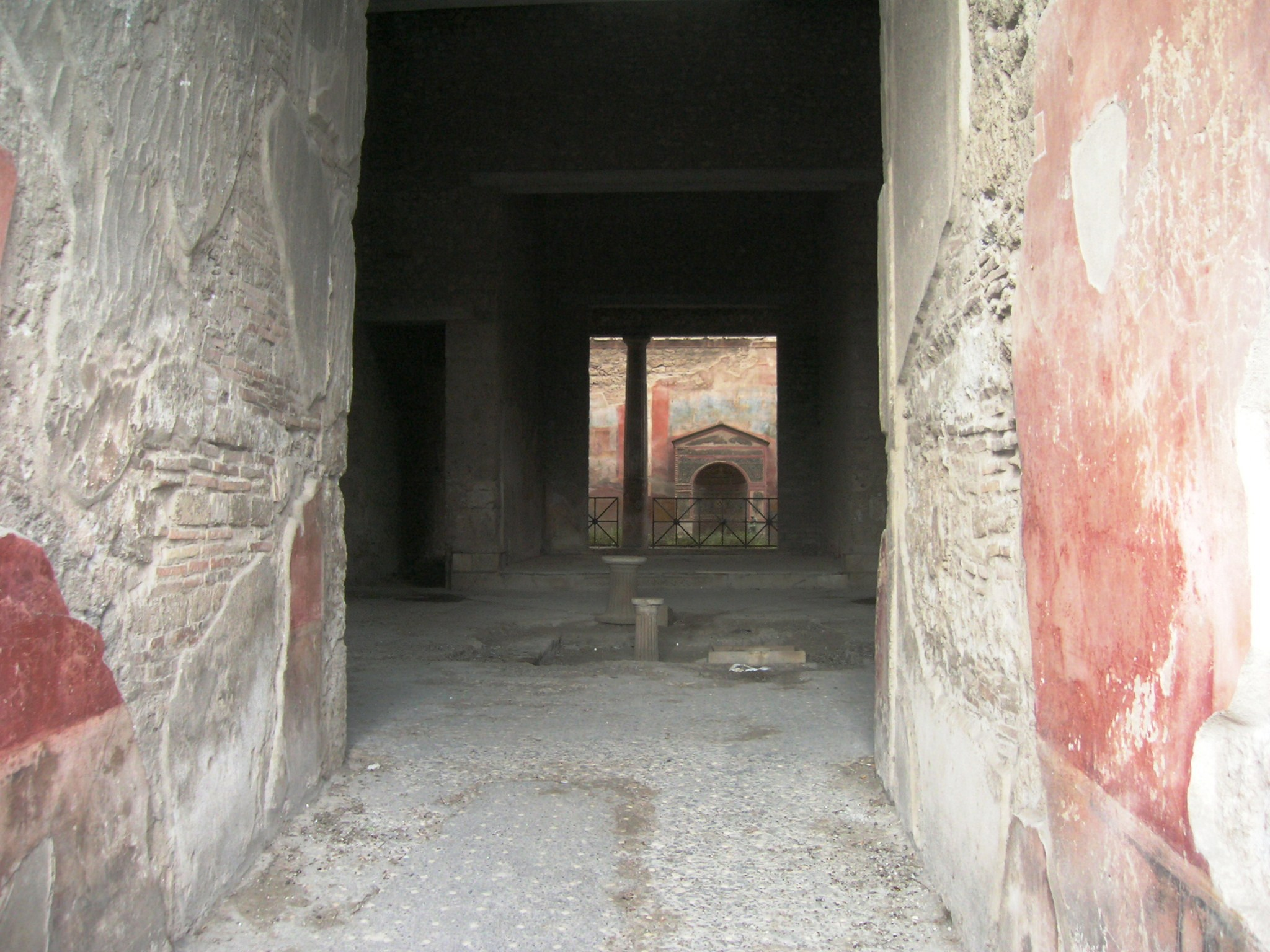
Fauces (1) accessed through entrance 23

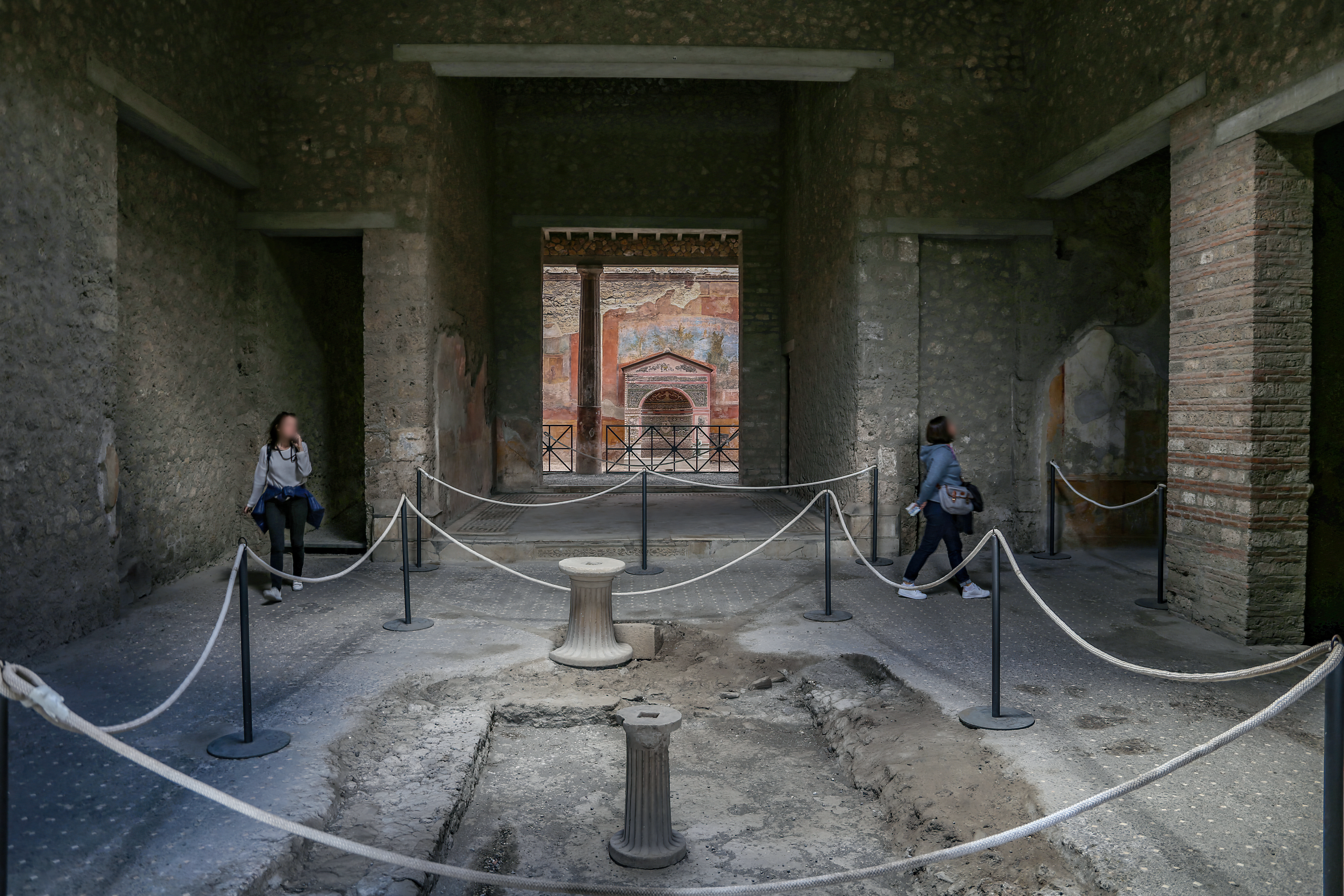
Atrium (2) with impluvium and mosaic pavement

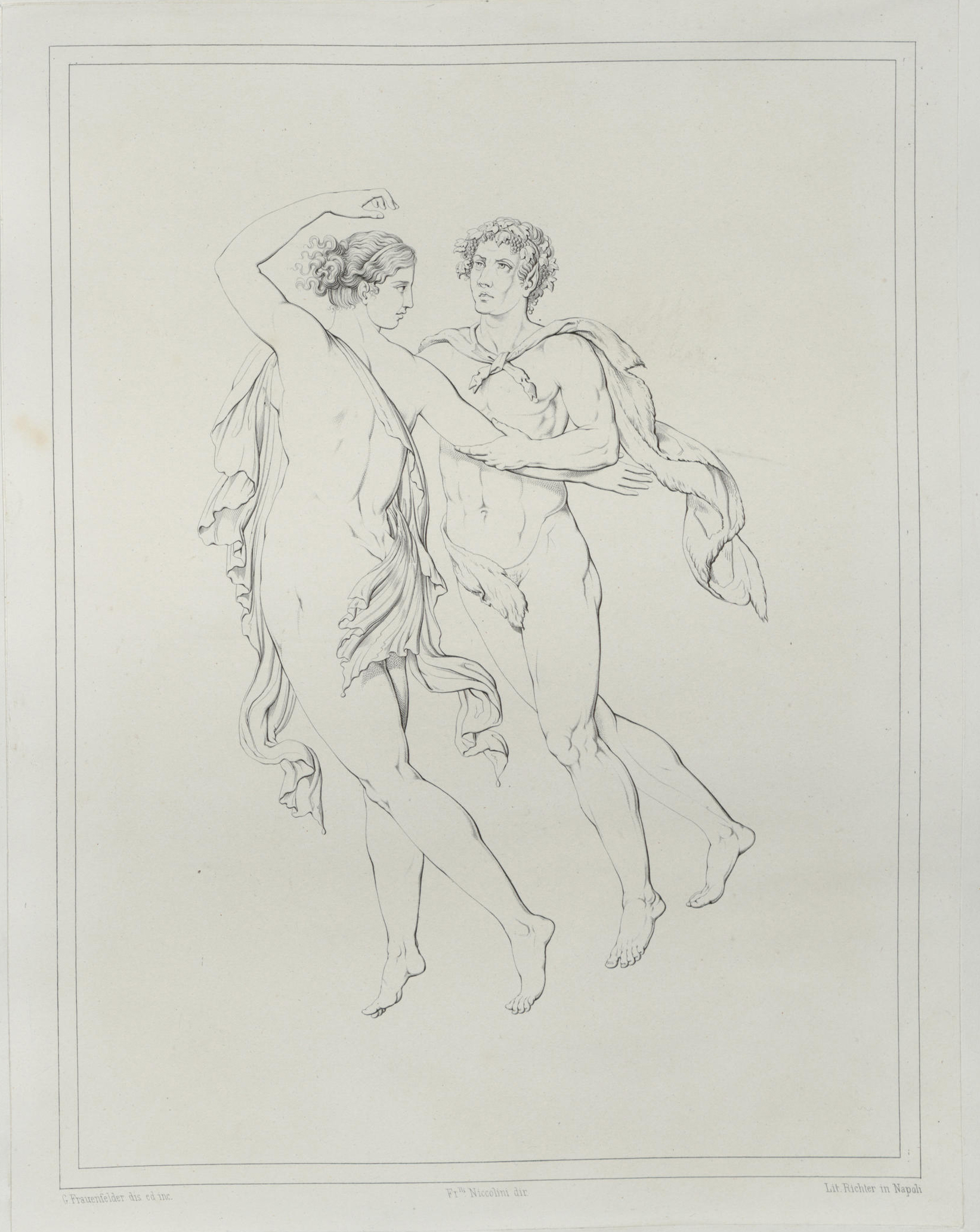
Dancing Faun and Bacchante 4th Style Fresco from Room 3

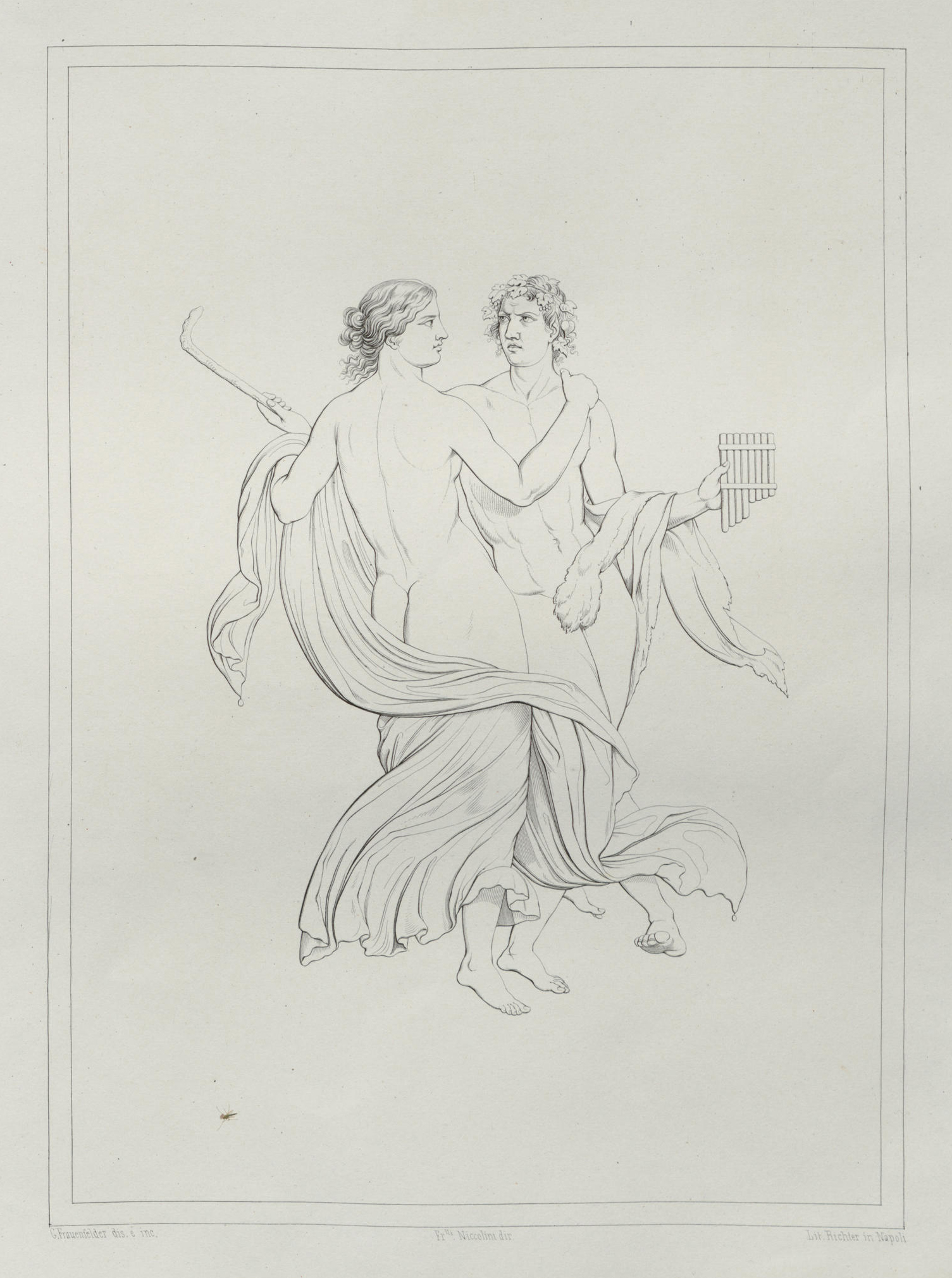
Dancing Faun and Bacchante from Room 3

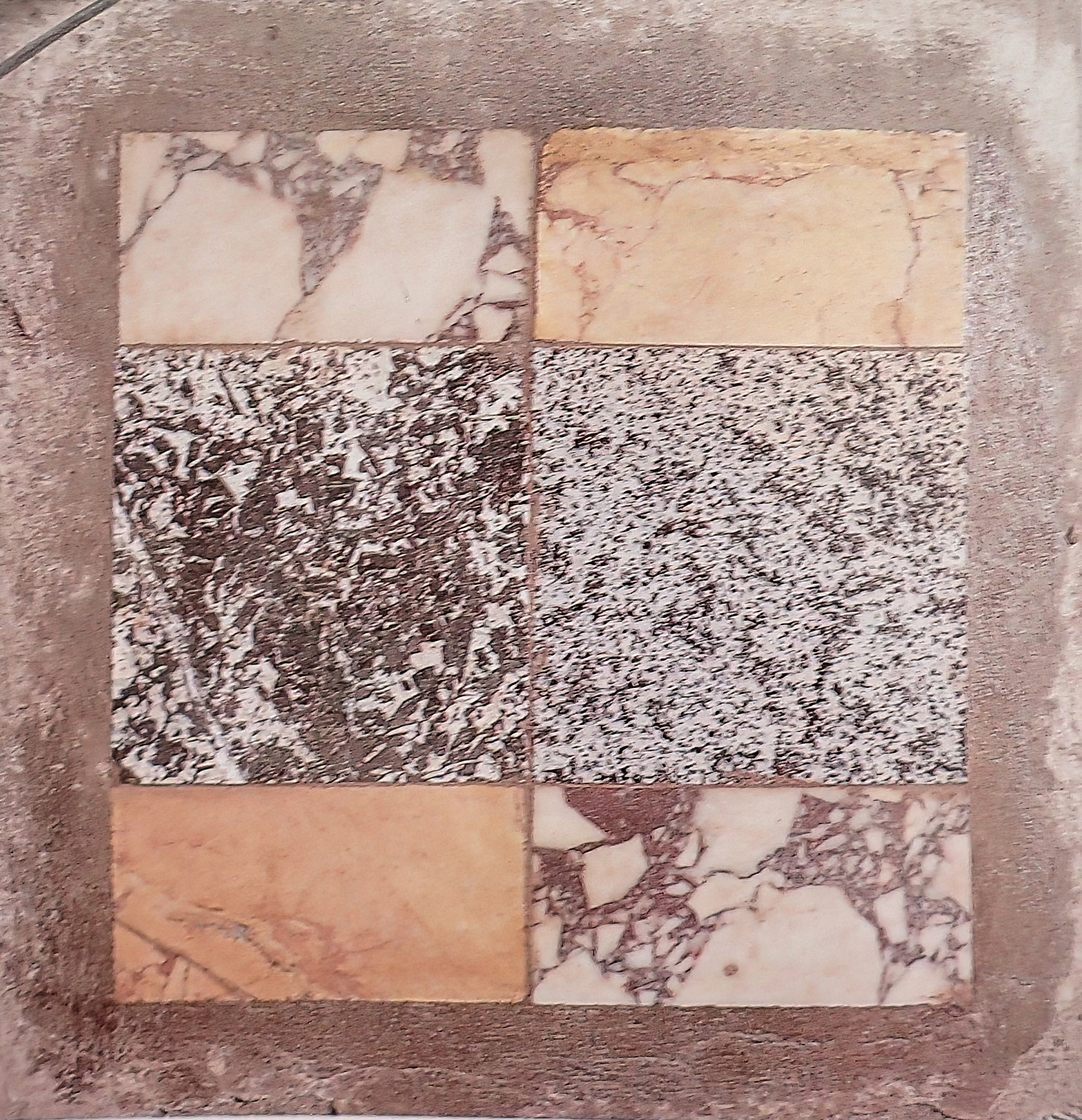
Room 4 Opus Sectiile Mosaic

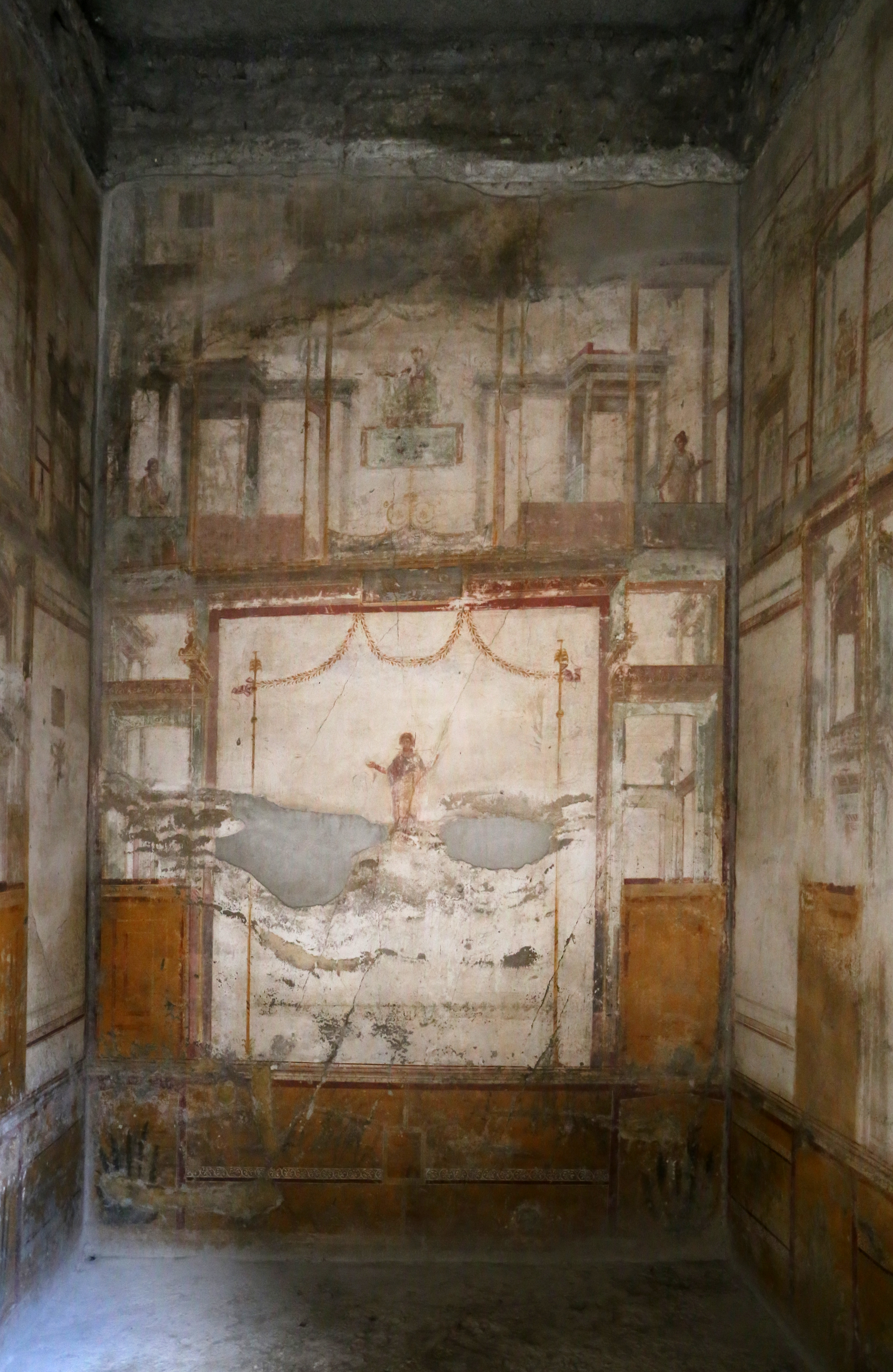
Frescoed north wall of Ala 7

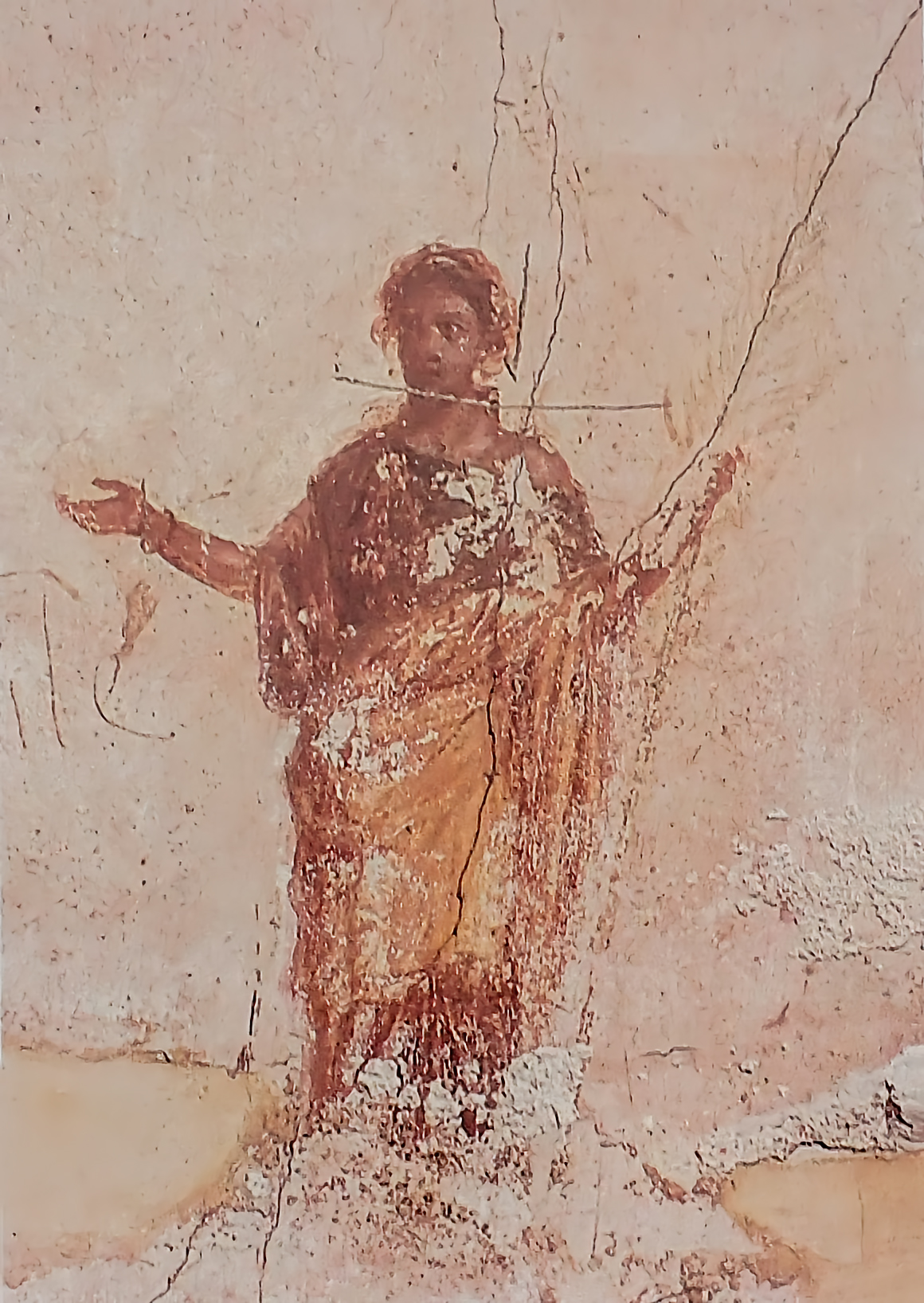
Ala 7 North wall Middle Zone Middle Figure

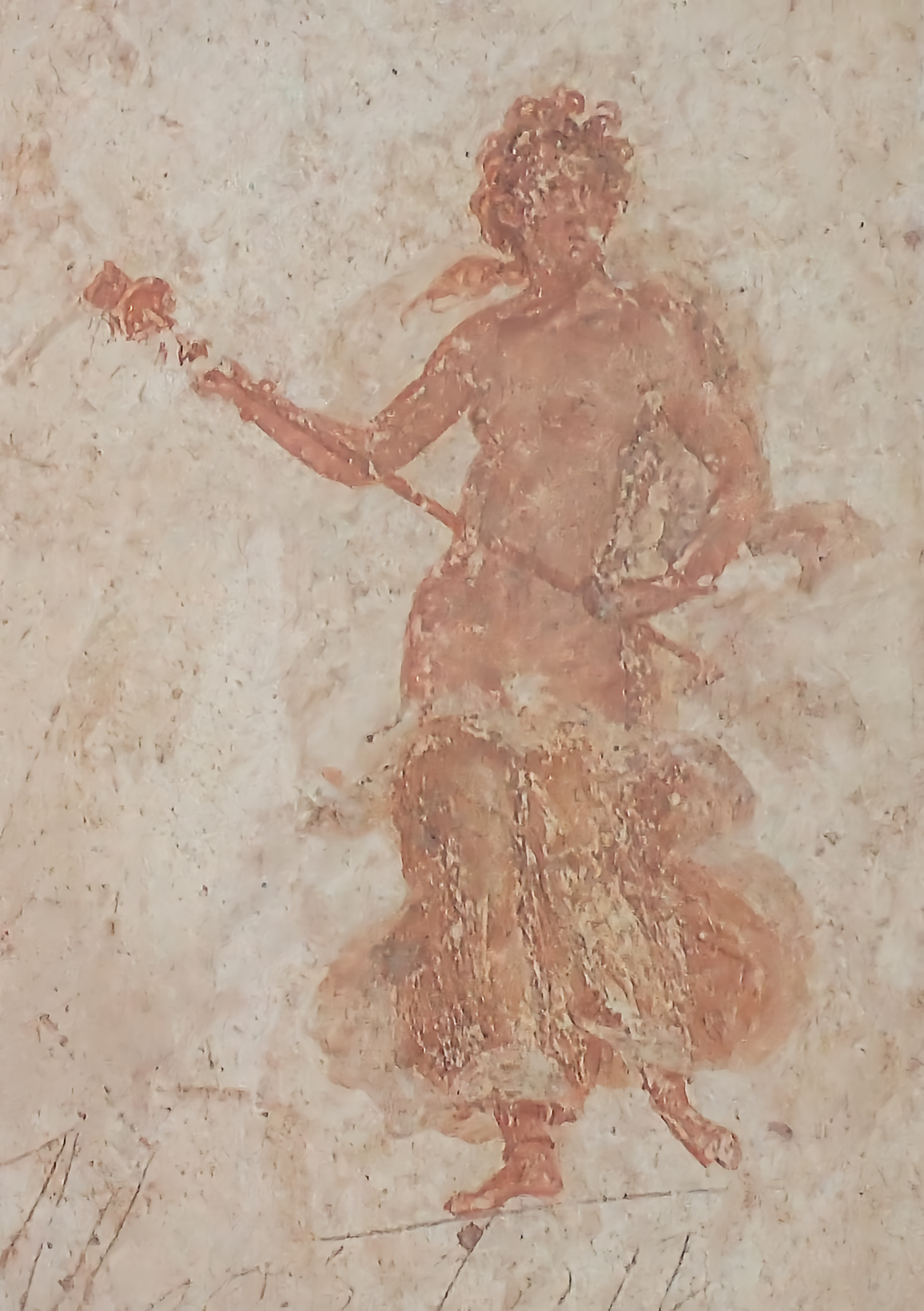
Ala 7 East Wall Middle Zone Middle Figure

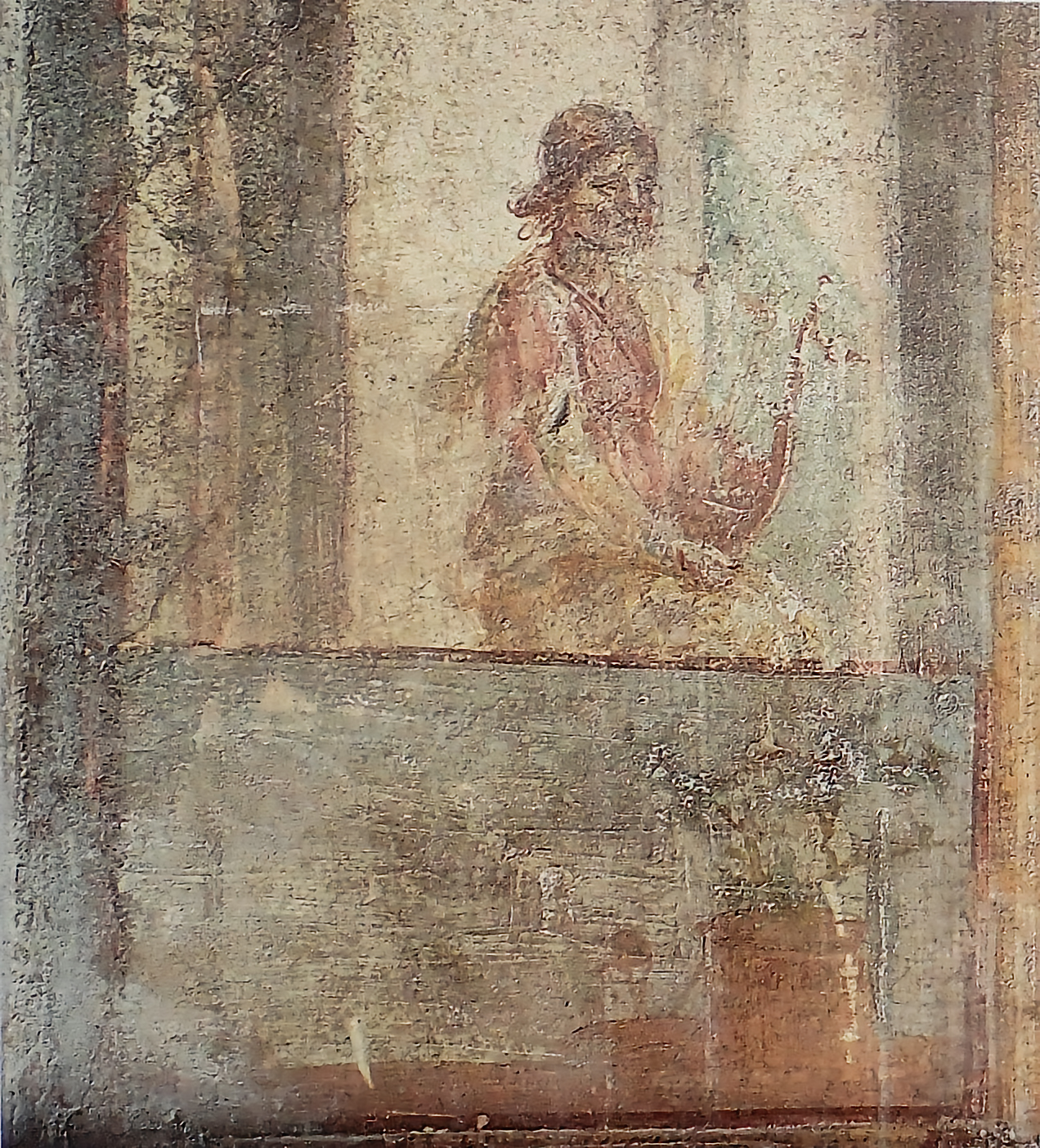
Ala 7 North Wall Upper Zone Left Figure

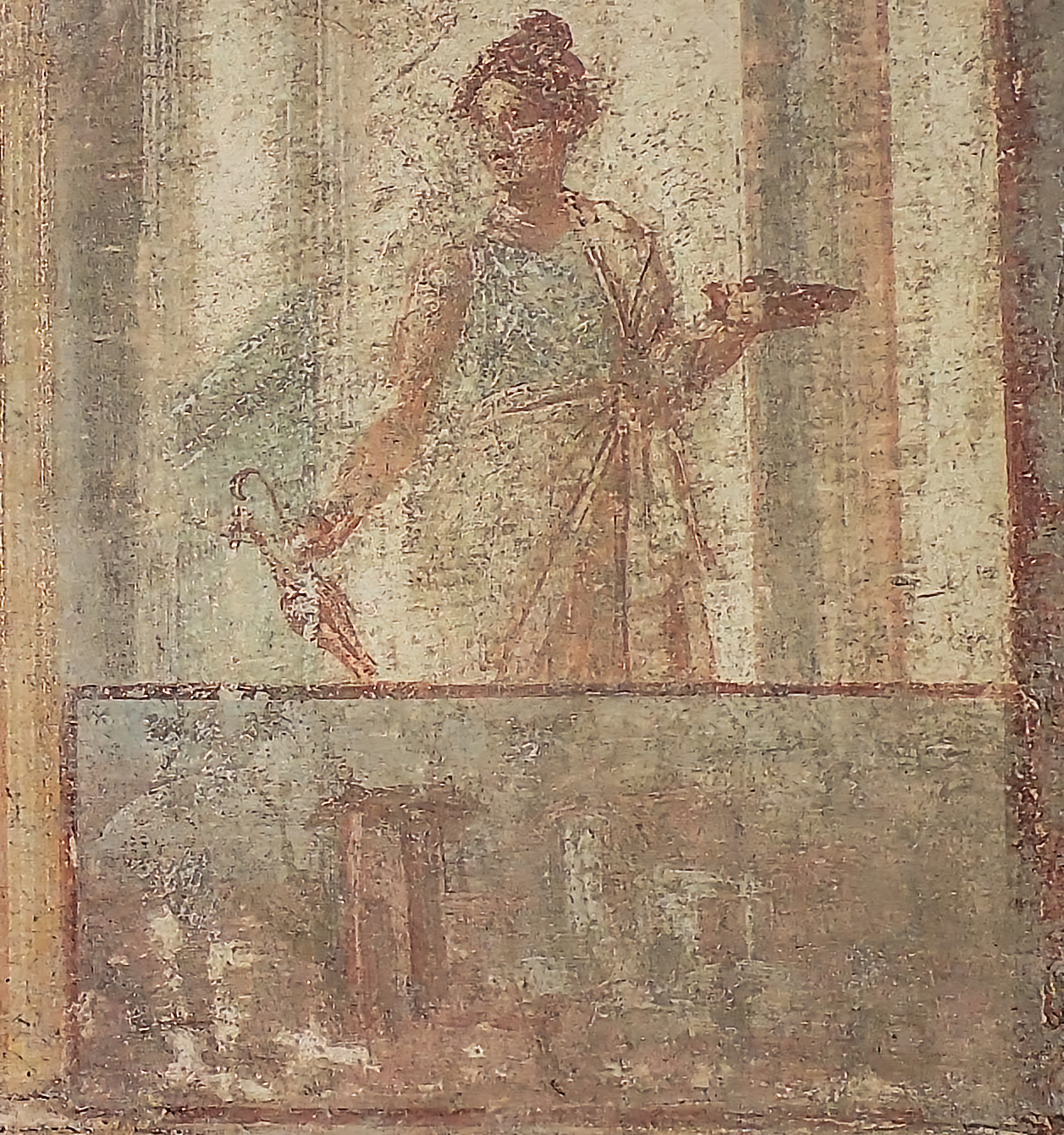
Ala 7 North Wall Upper Zone Right Figure

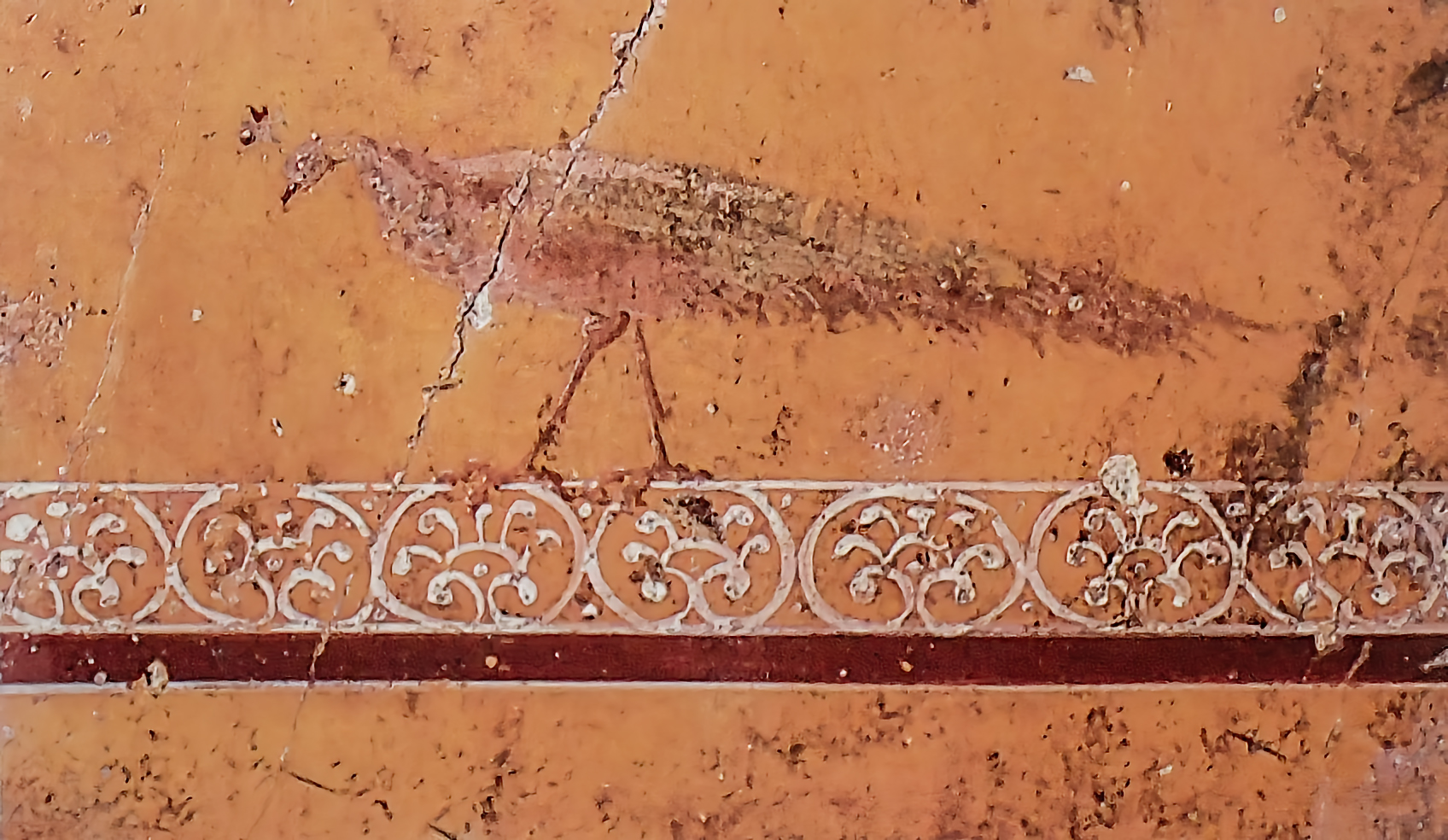
Ala 7 North Wall Sockel Peacock right

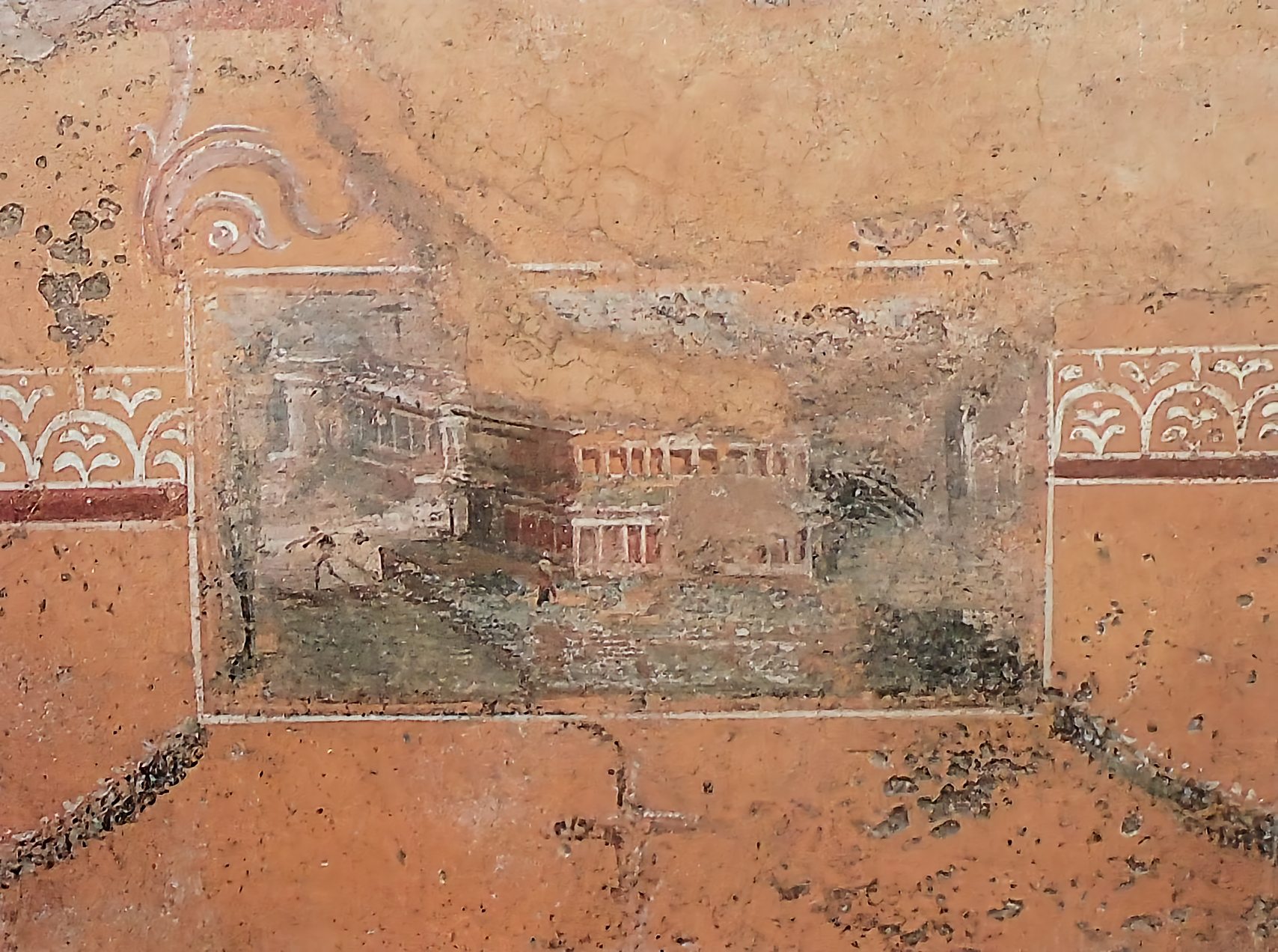
Ala 7 East Wall Sockel Panel Painting

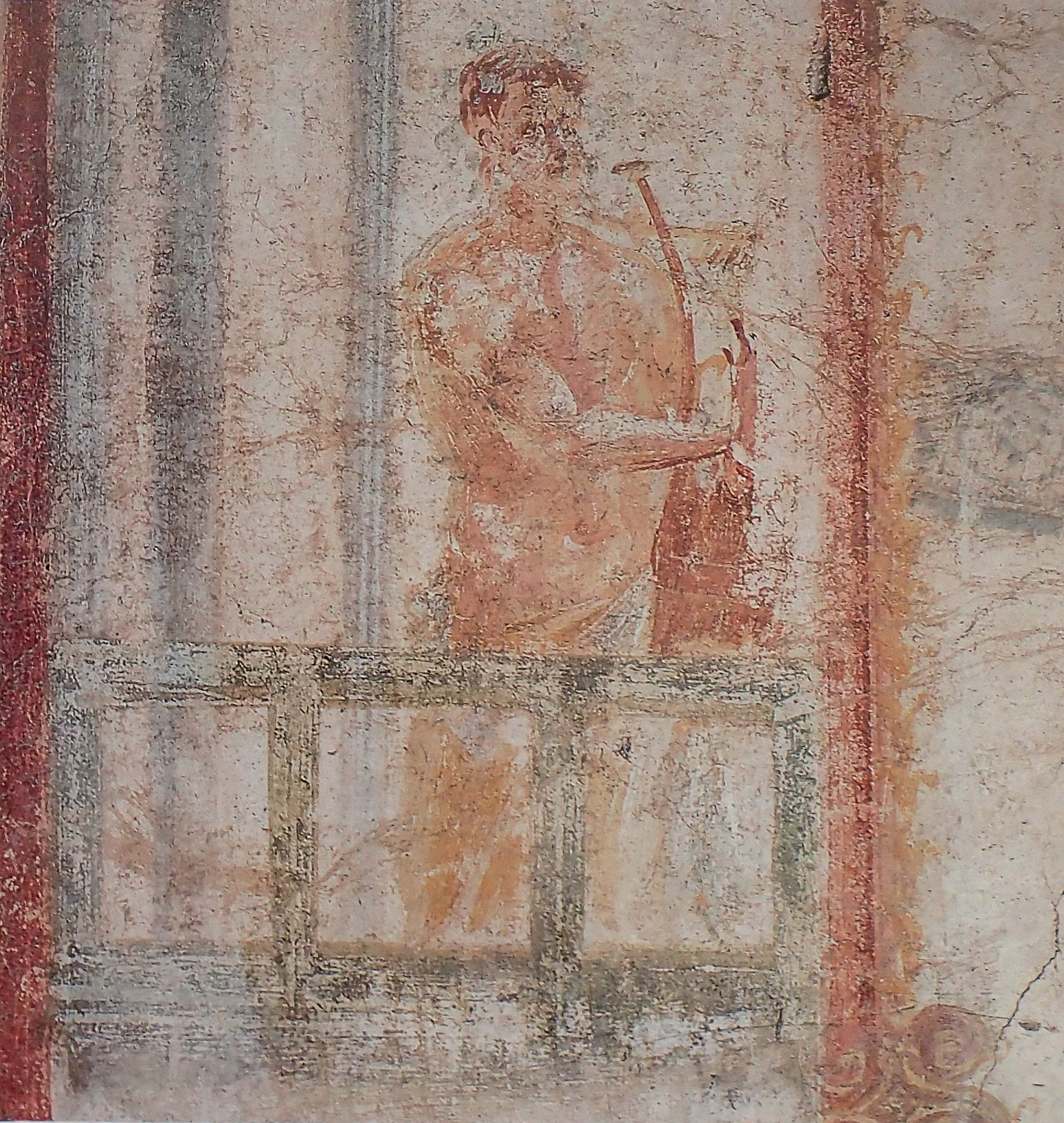
la 7 West East Wall Upper Zone Left Apollo with lyre

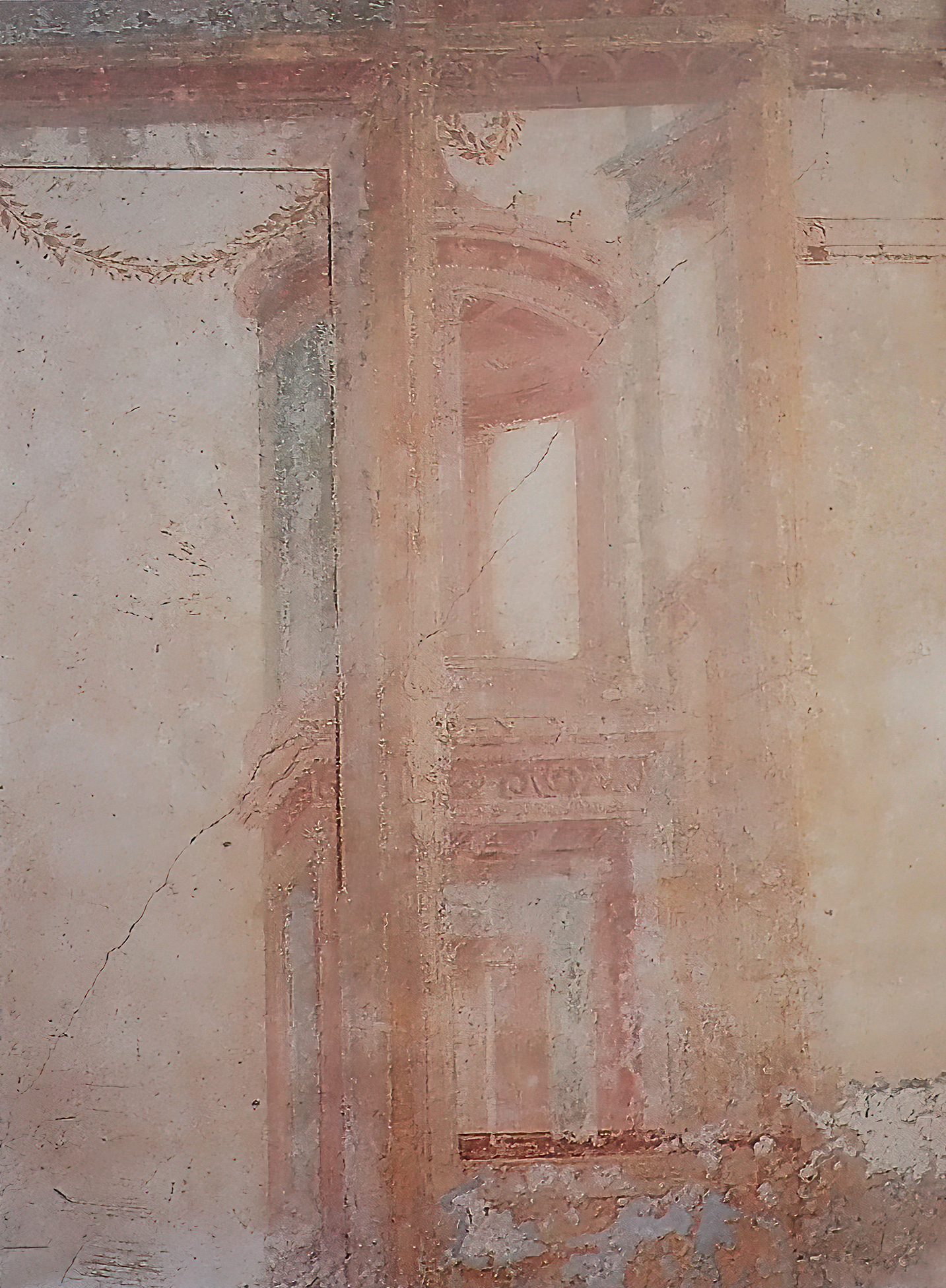
Ala 7 East Wall Middle Zone right

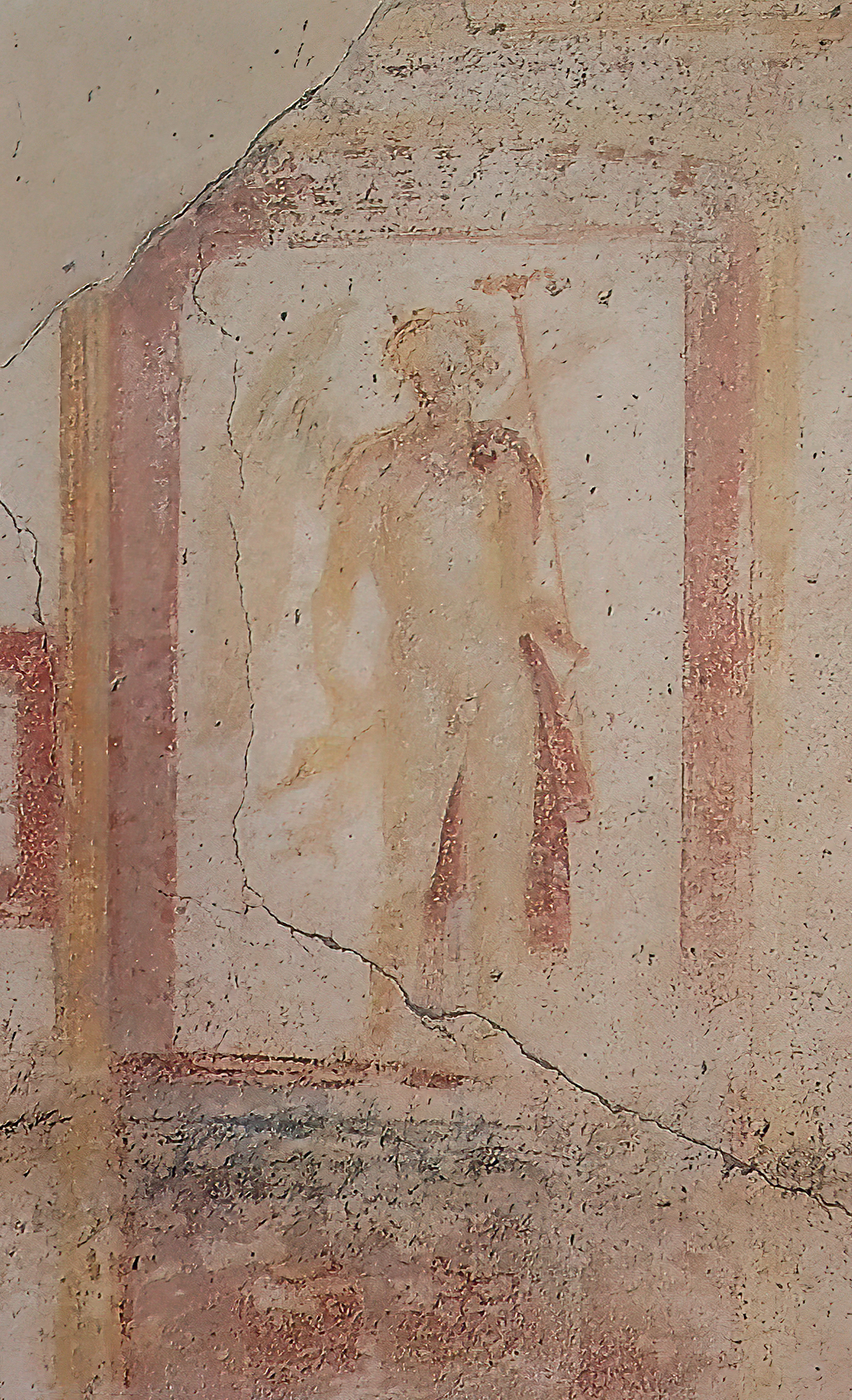
Ala 7 East Wall Upper Zone Right Dionysus with thyrsus

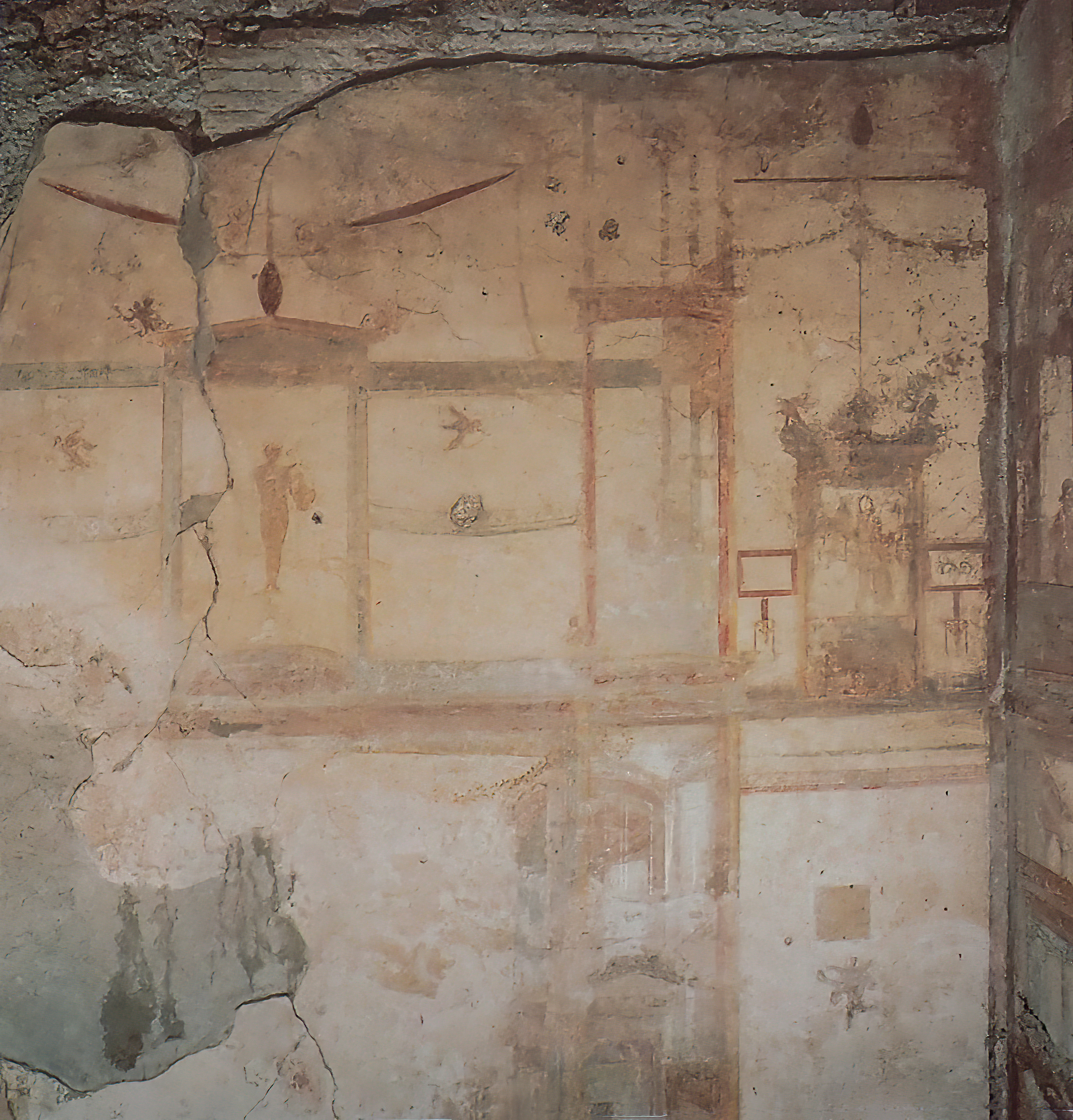
Ala 7 West Wall Right Side

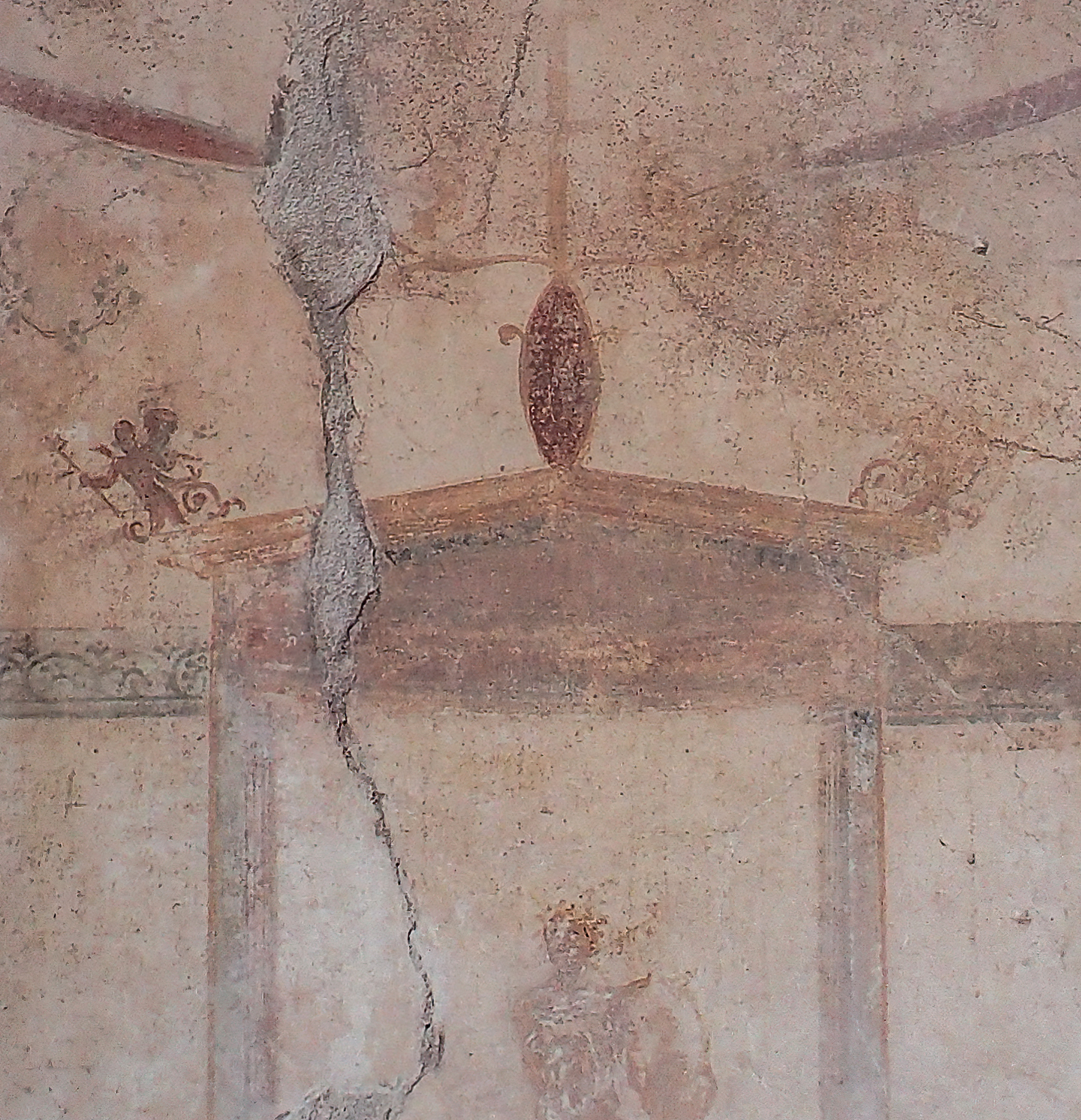
West Wall Upper Zone Center

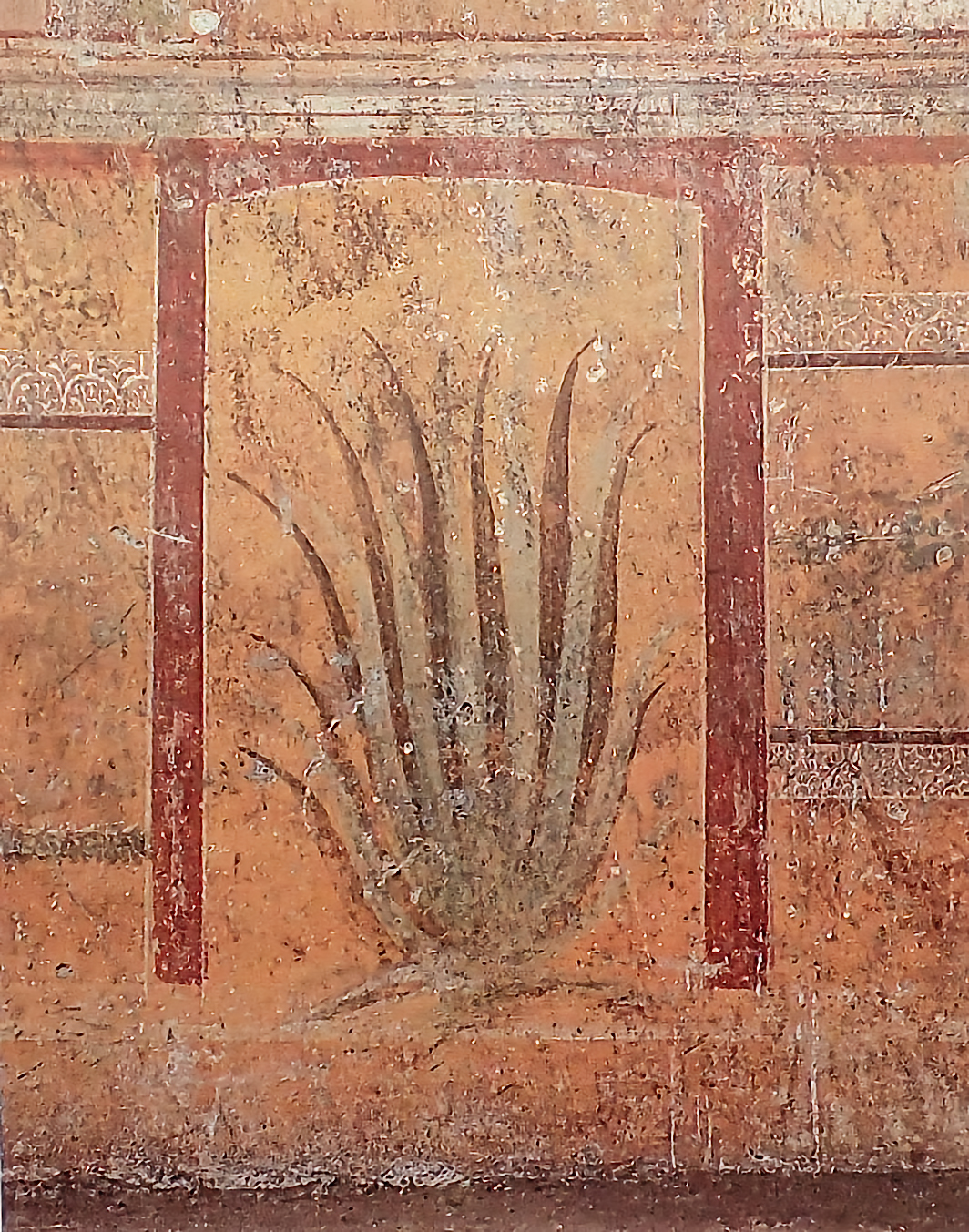
Ala 7 West Wall Sockel right

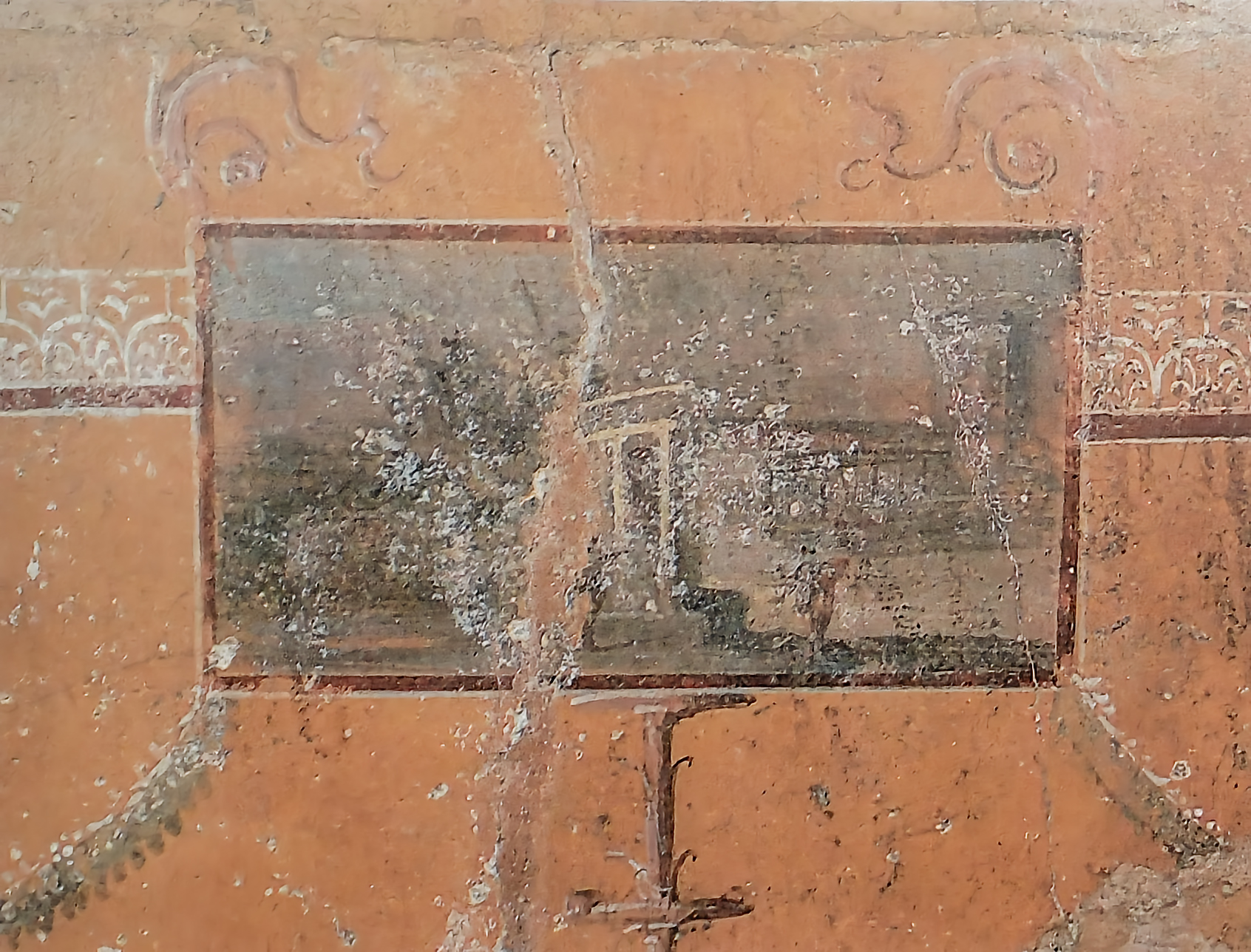
Ala 7 West Wall Sockel panel image

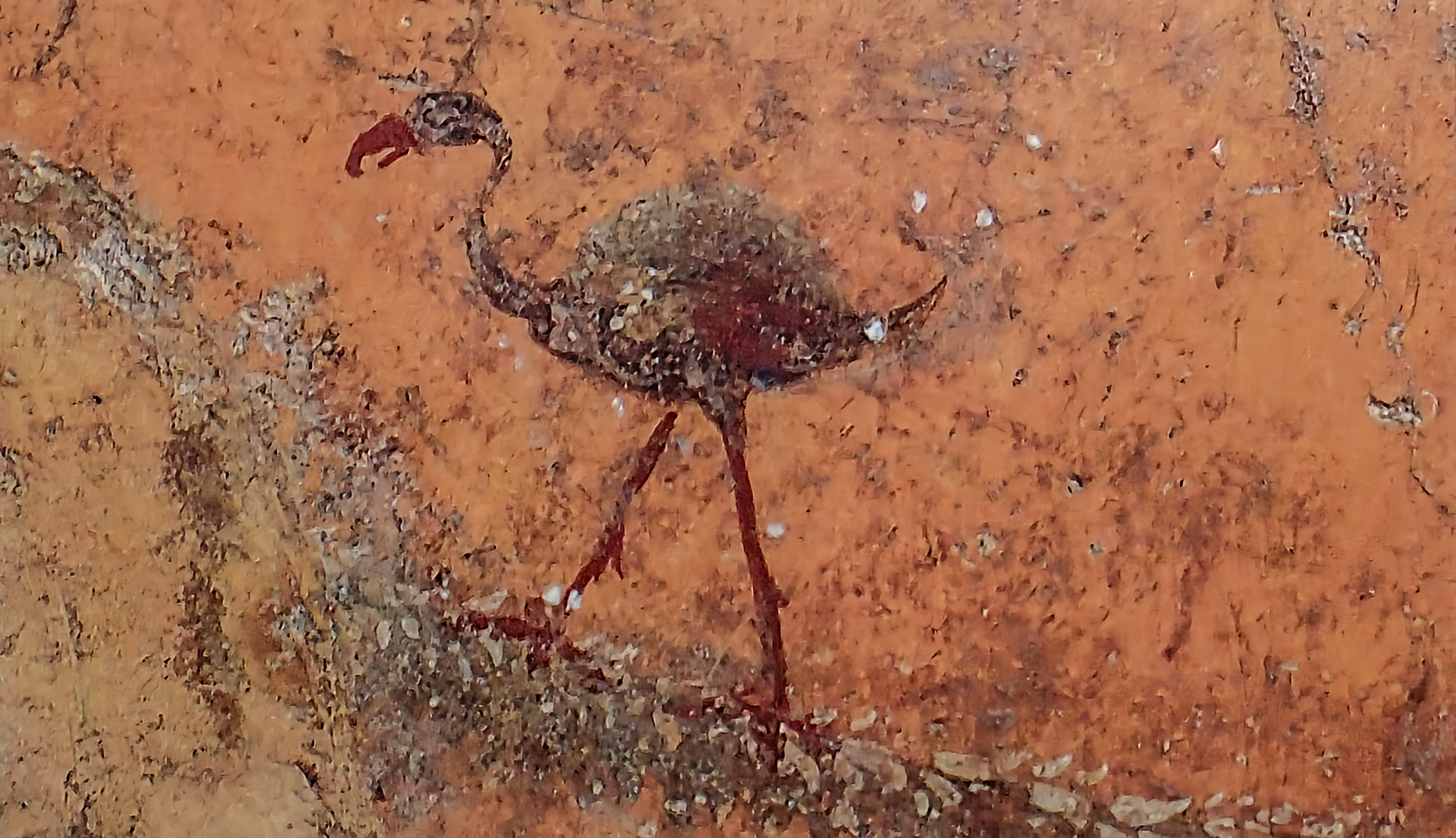
Ala 7 Westwall Sockel Right Bird

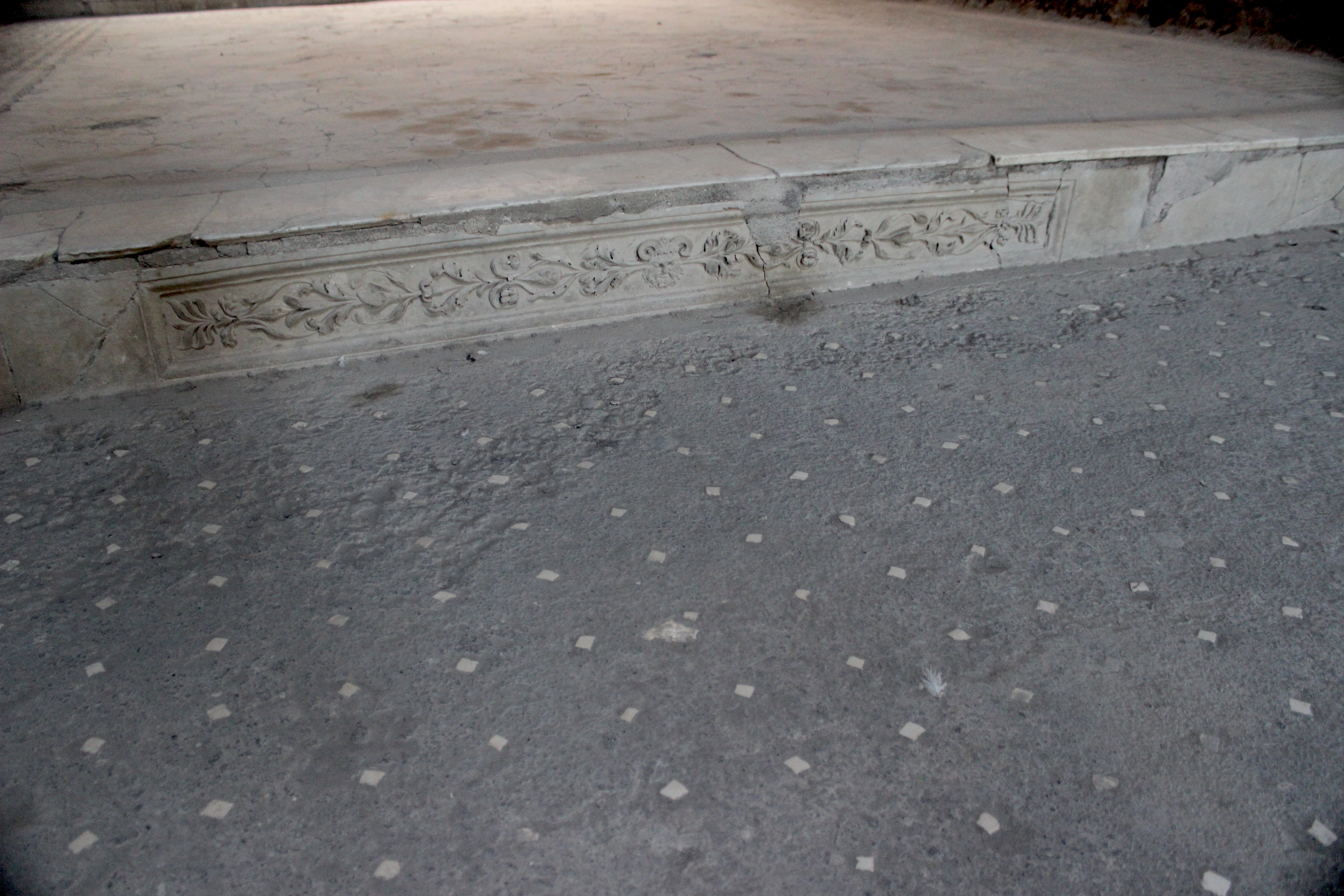
Carved marble step to the tablinum (8)

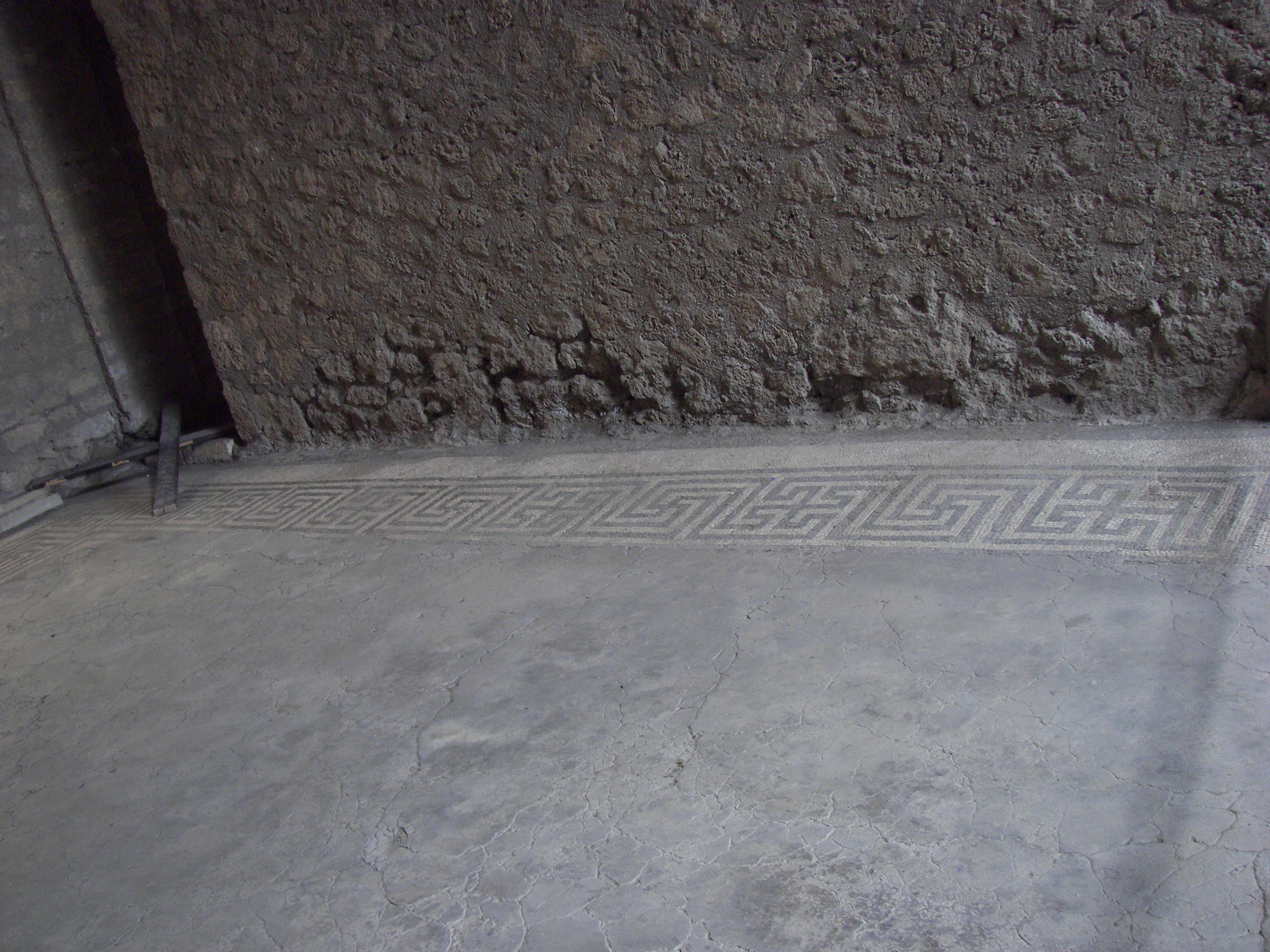
Meander mosaic border around the pavement of tablinum (8)

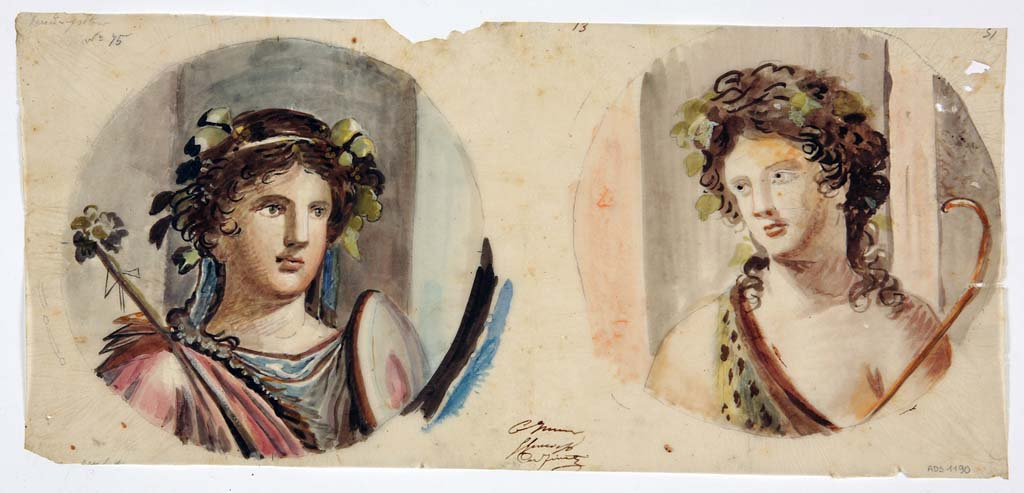
Heads of Maenads from walls of tablinum incorporated into one painting by Giuseppe Marsigli

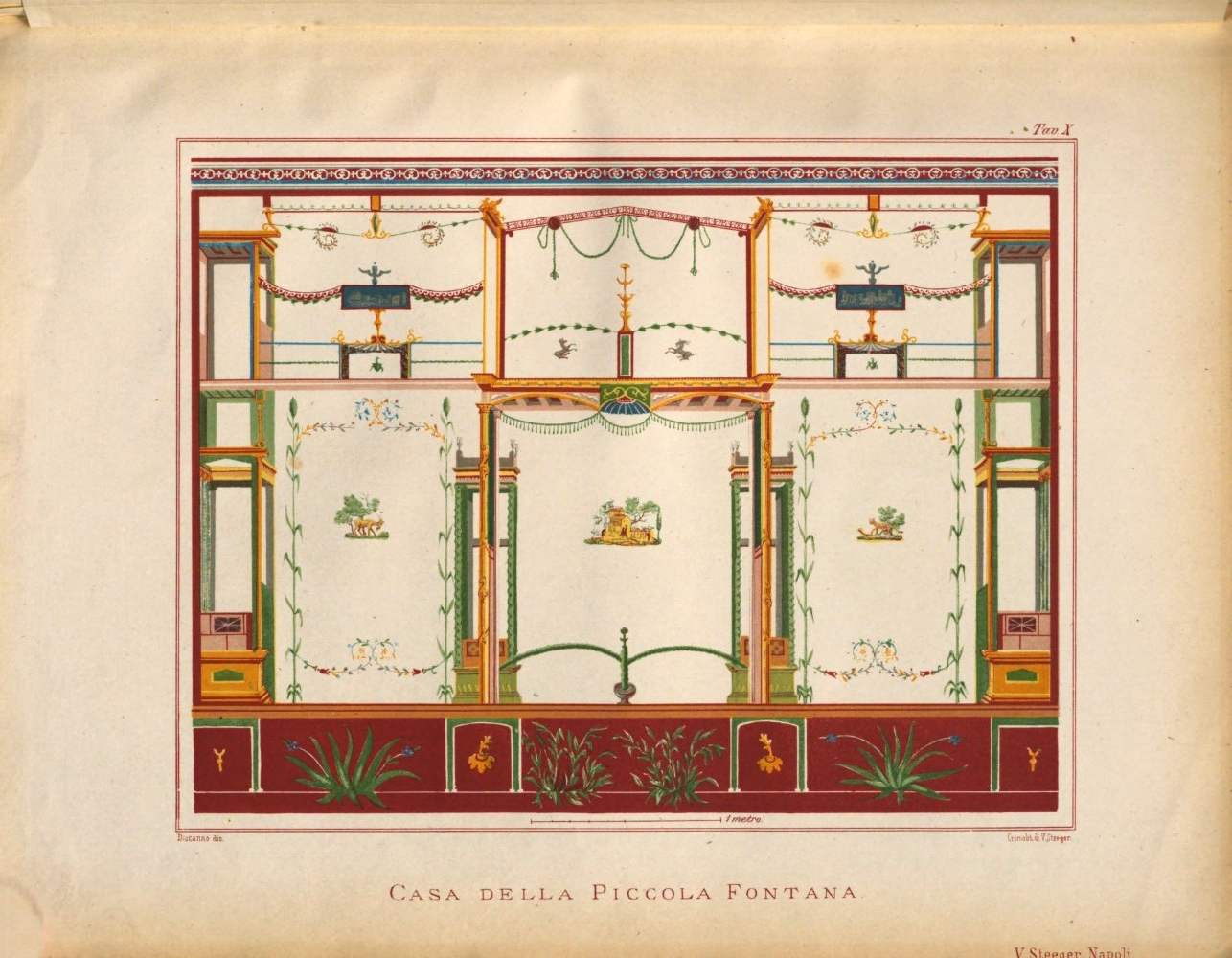
Frescoed wall in Room 9

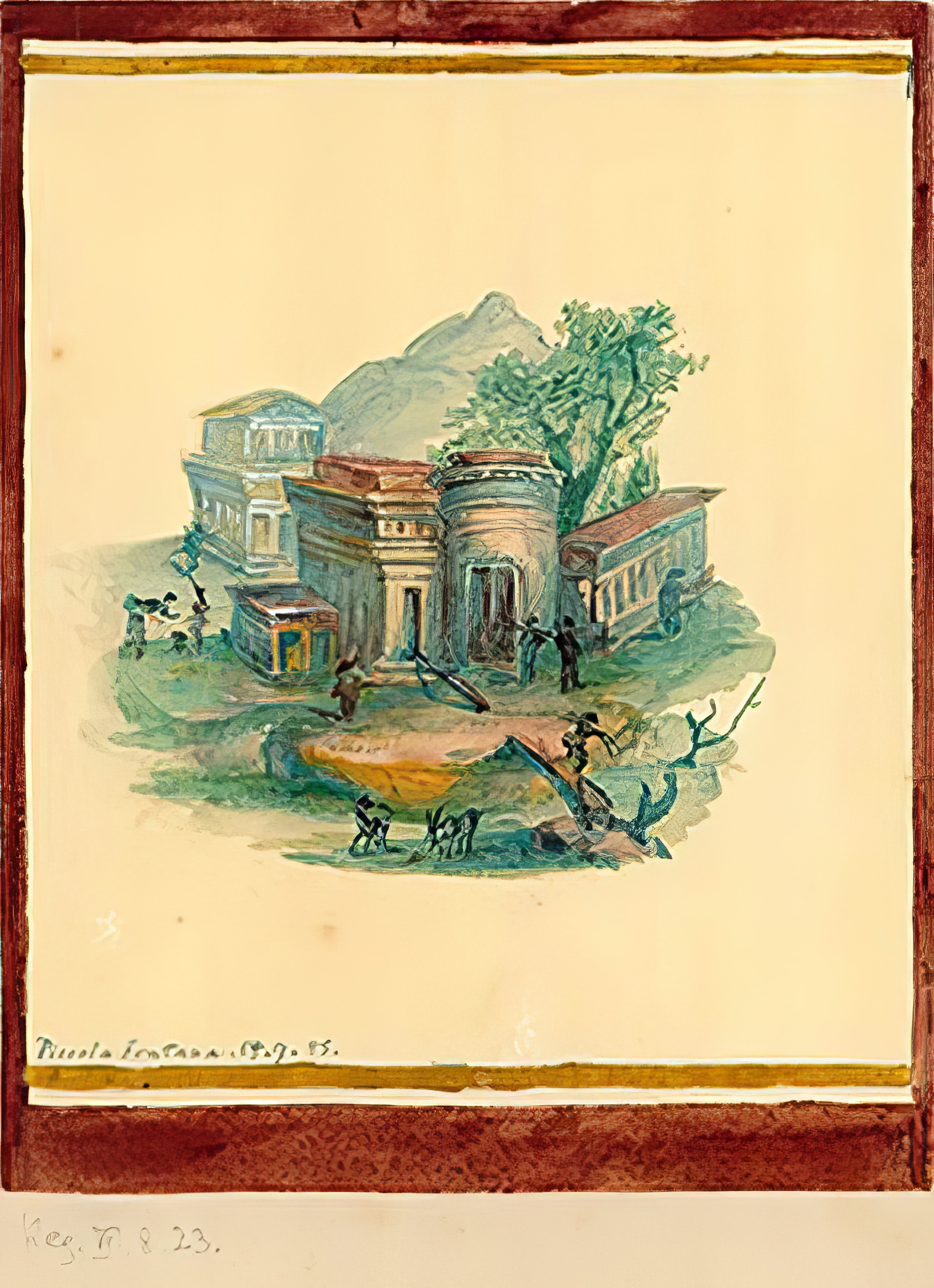
1885 Watercolor of architectural landscape with houses or temple from the center of north wall Room 9

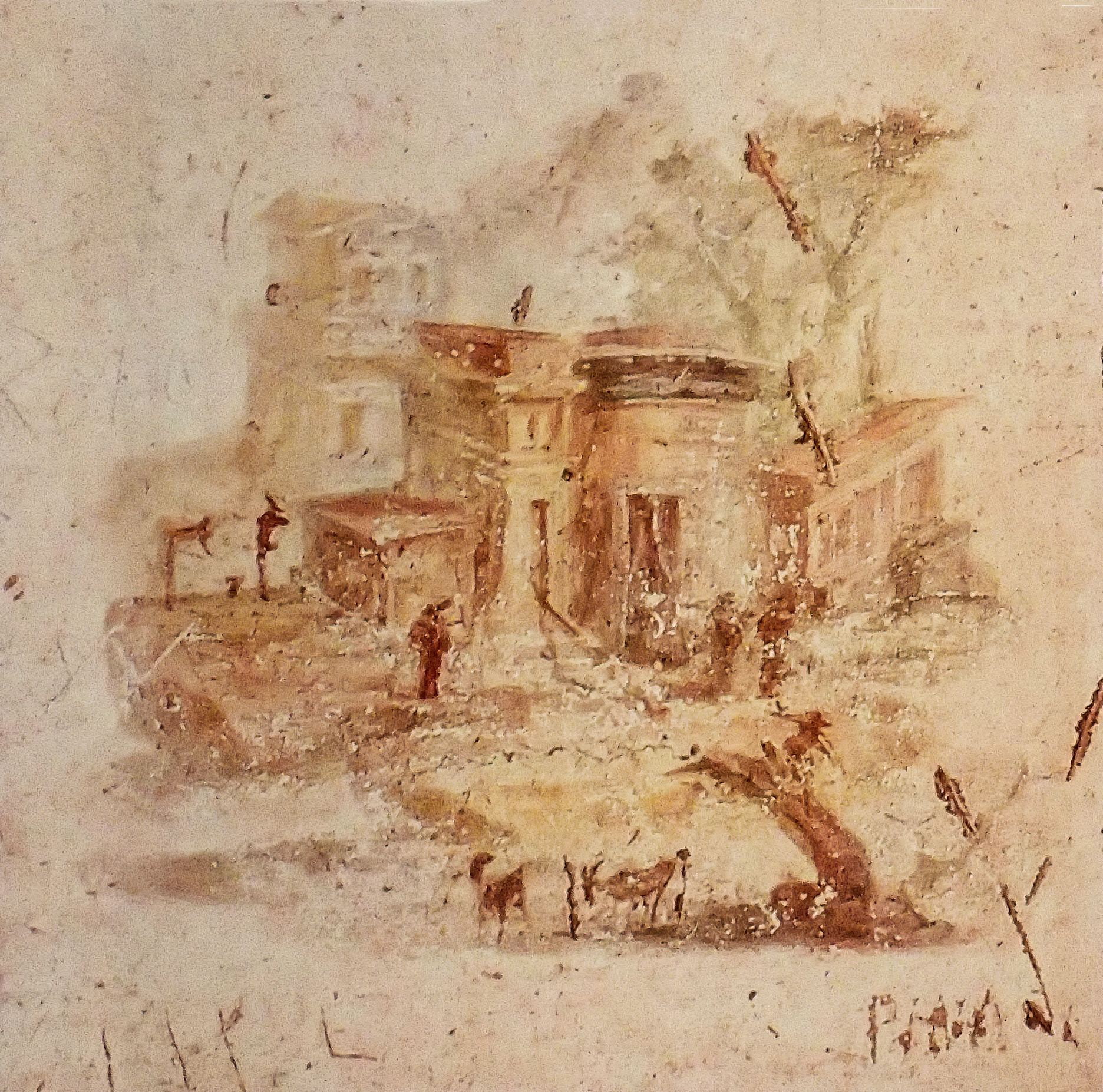
Room 9 North Wall Middle Zone

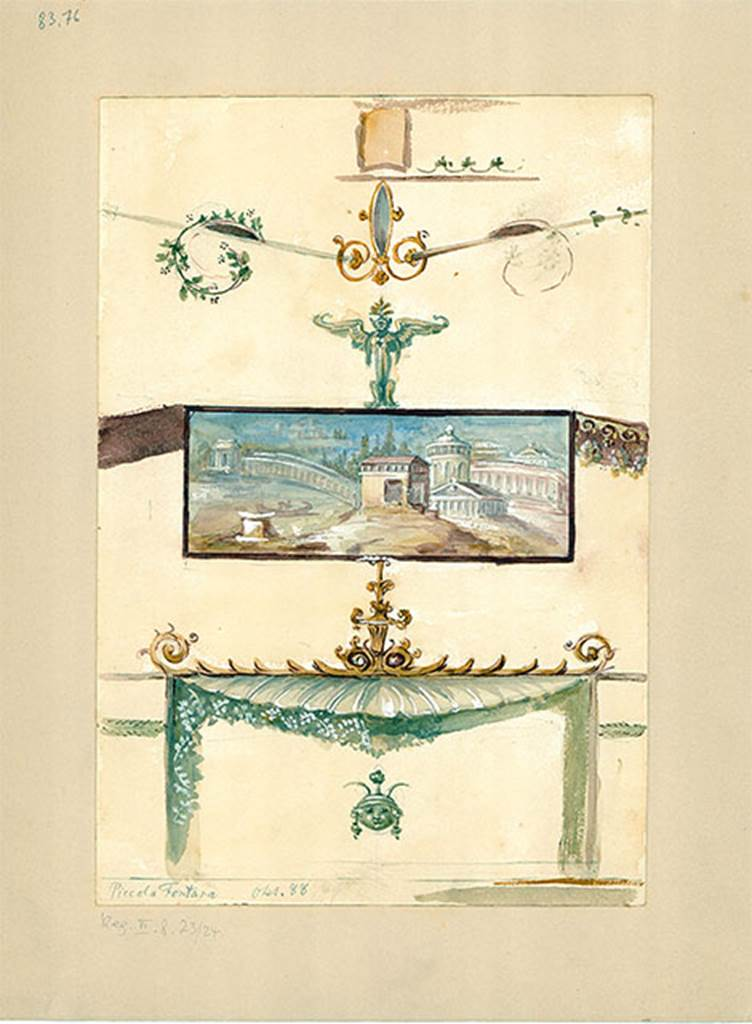
1888 watercolor of painted panel with architectural scene from upper north wall of cubiculum 9

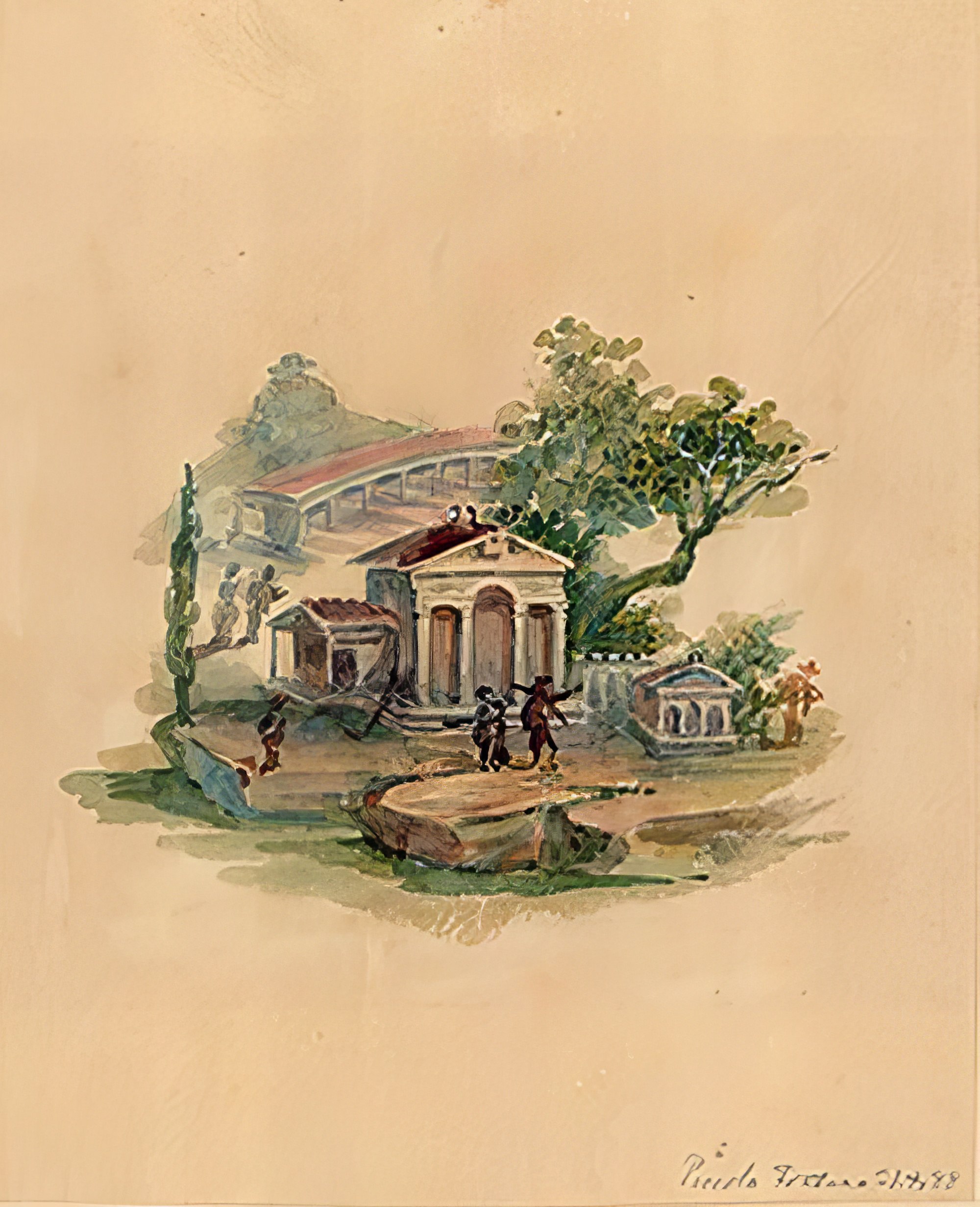
1888 watercolor of painted architectural scene from south wall of cubiculum 9

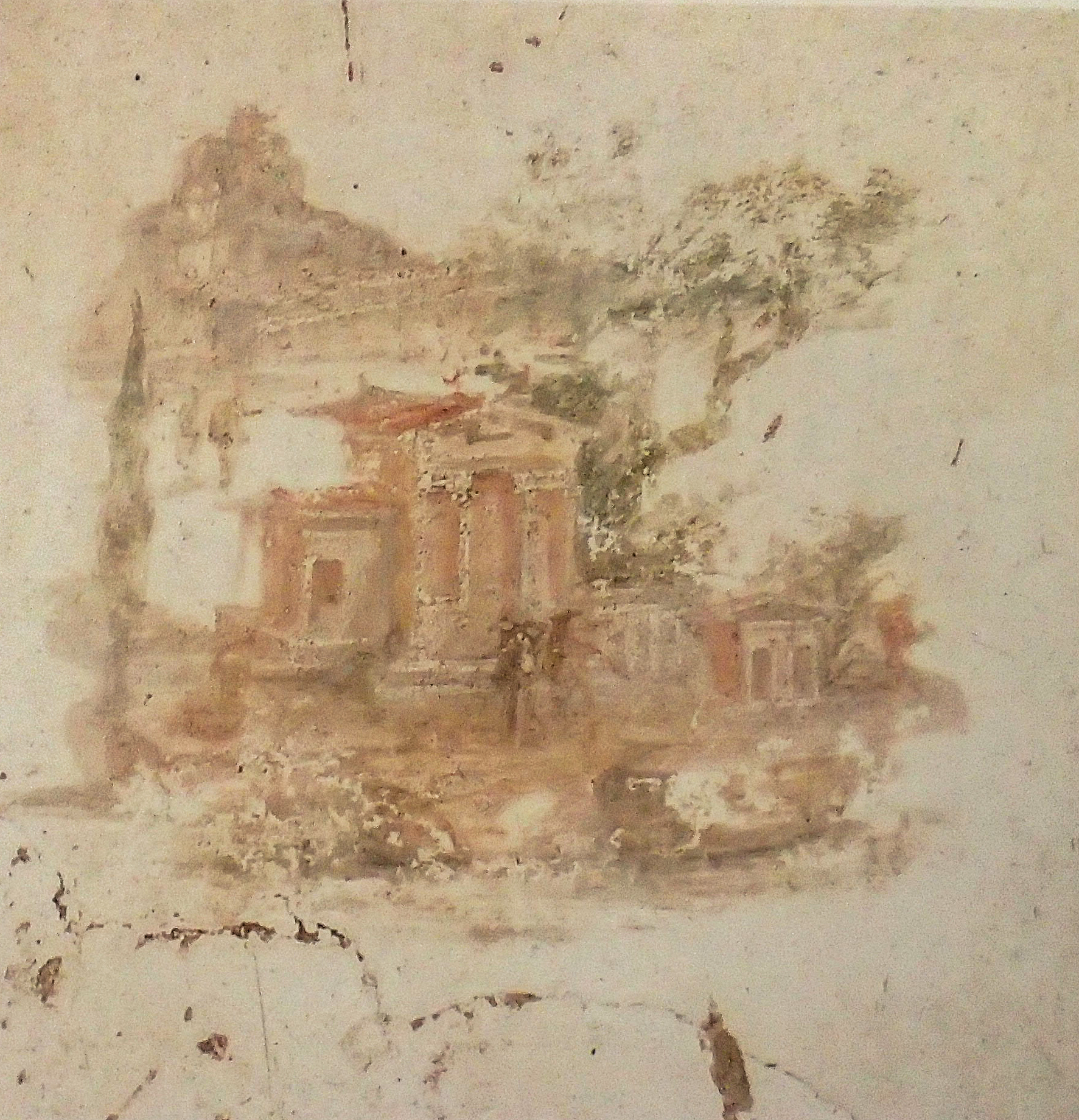
Landscape fresco Room 9 South Wall Middle Zone

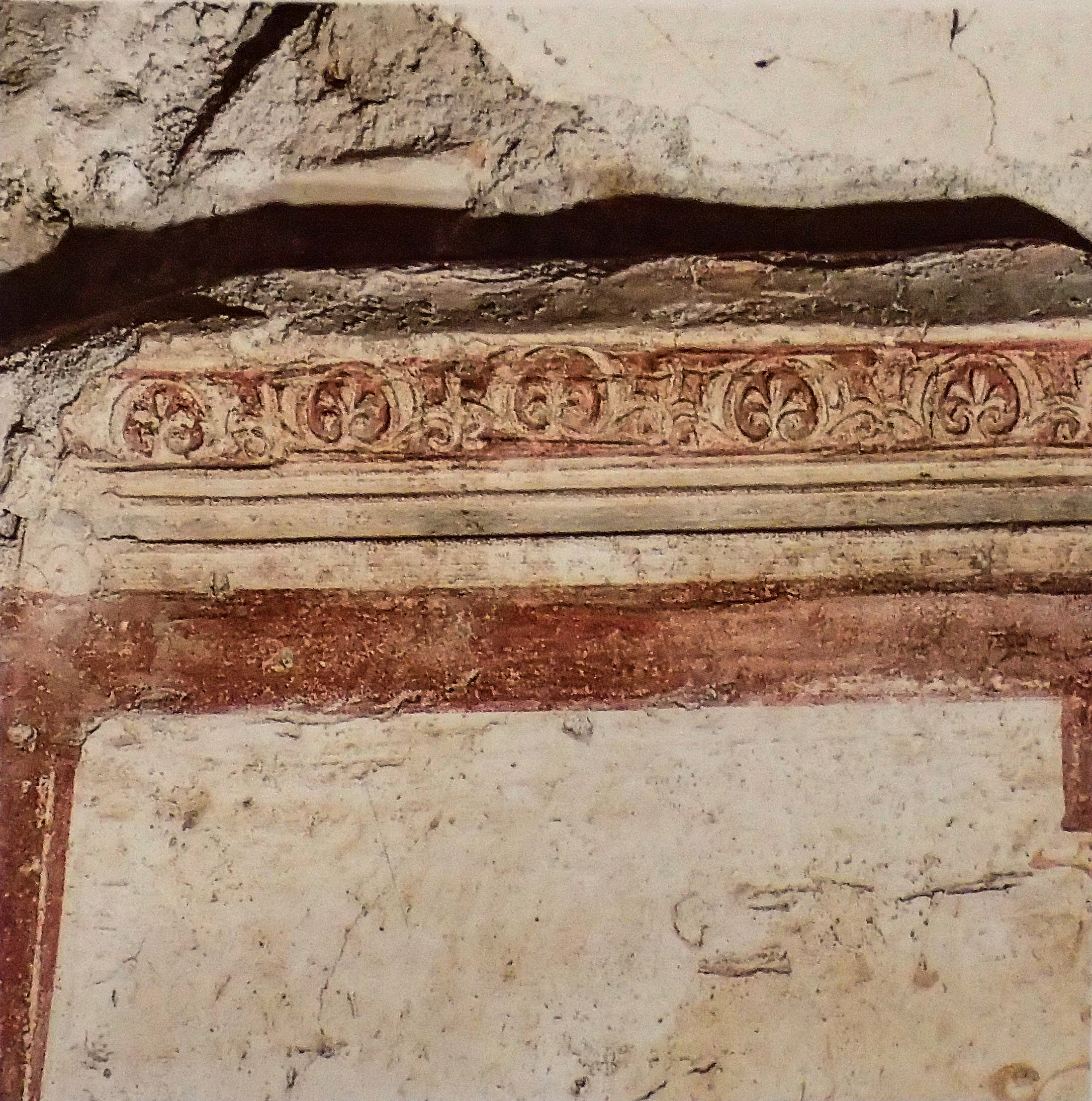
Room 9 Stucco cornice

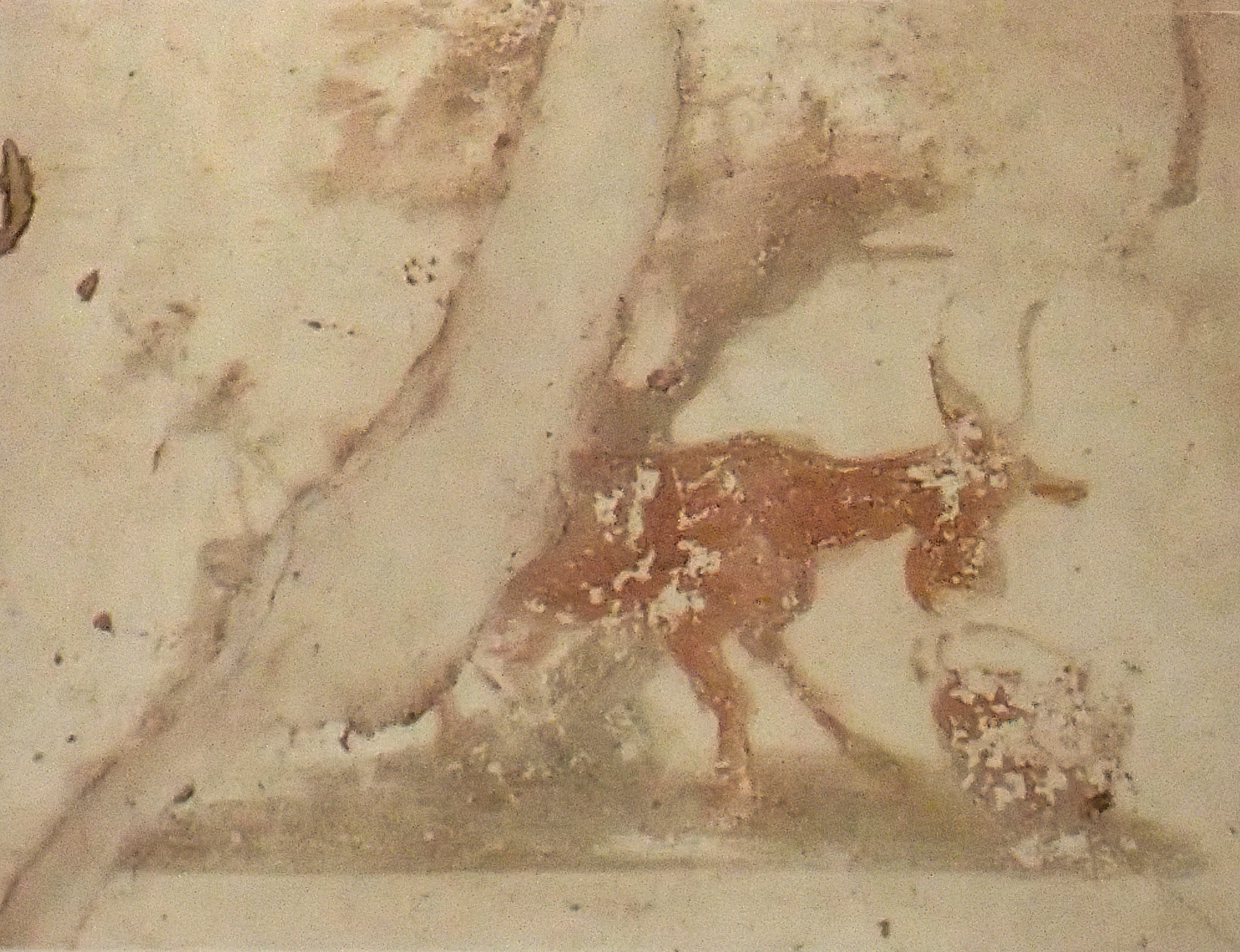
Room 9 South Wall Middle Zone Left goat figure

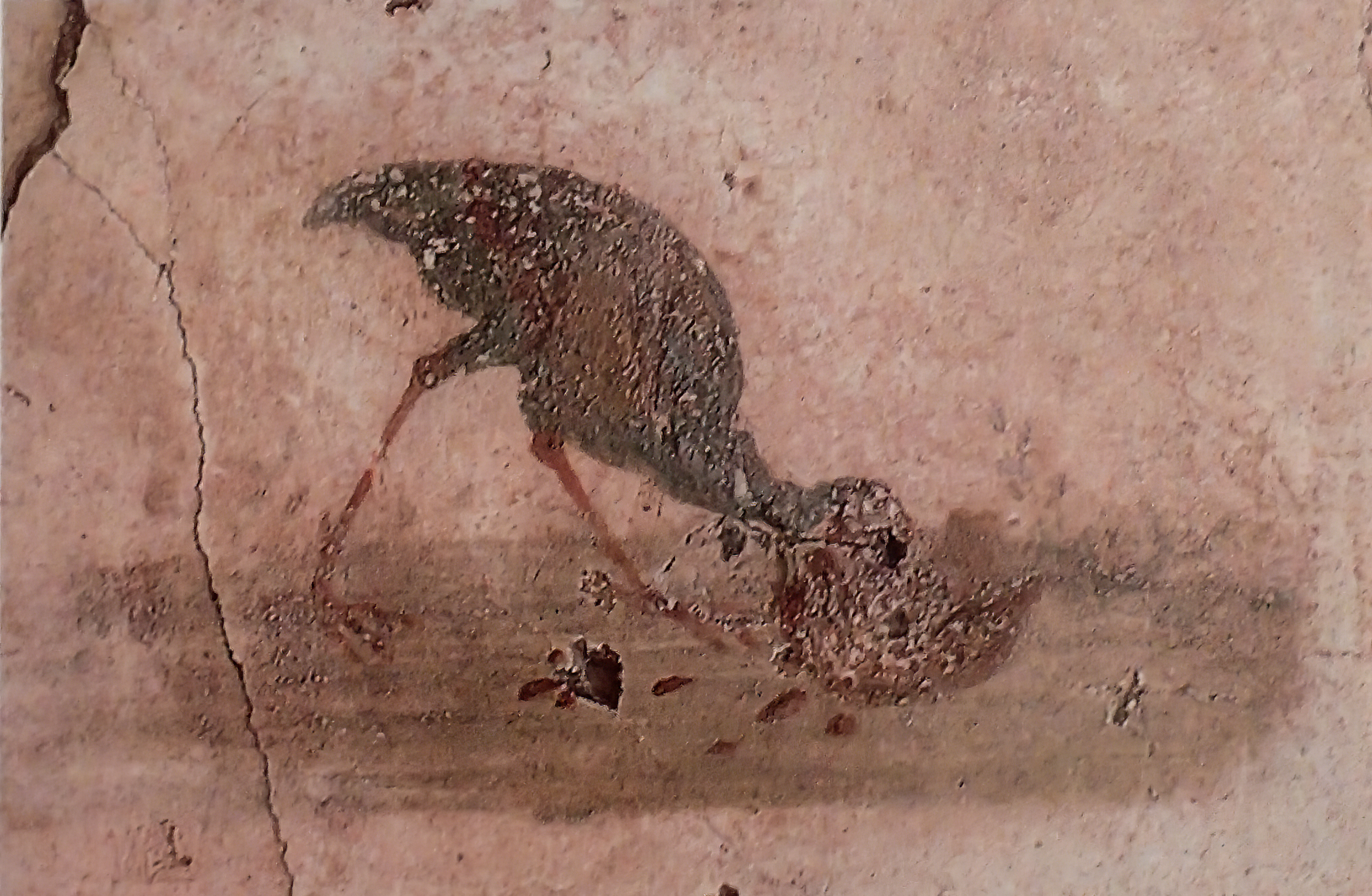
Room 9 East Wall Middle Zone Left Bird

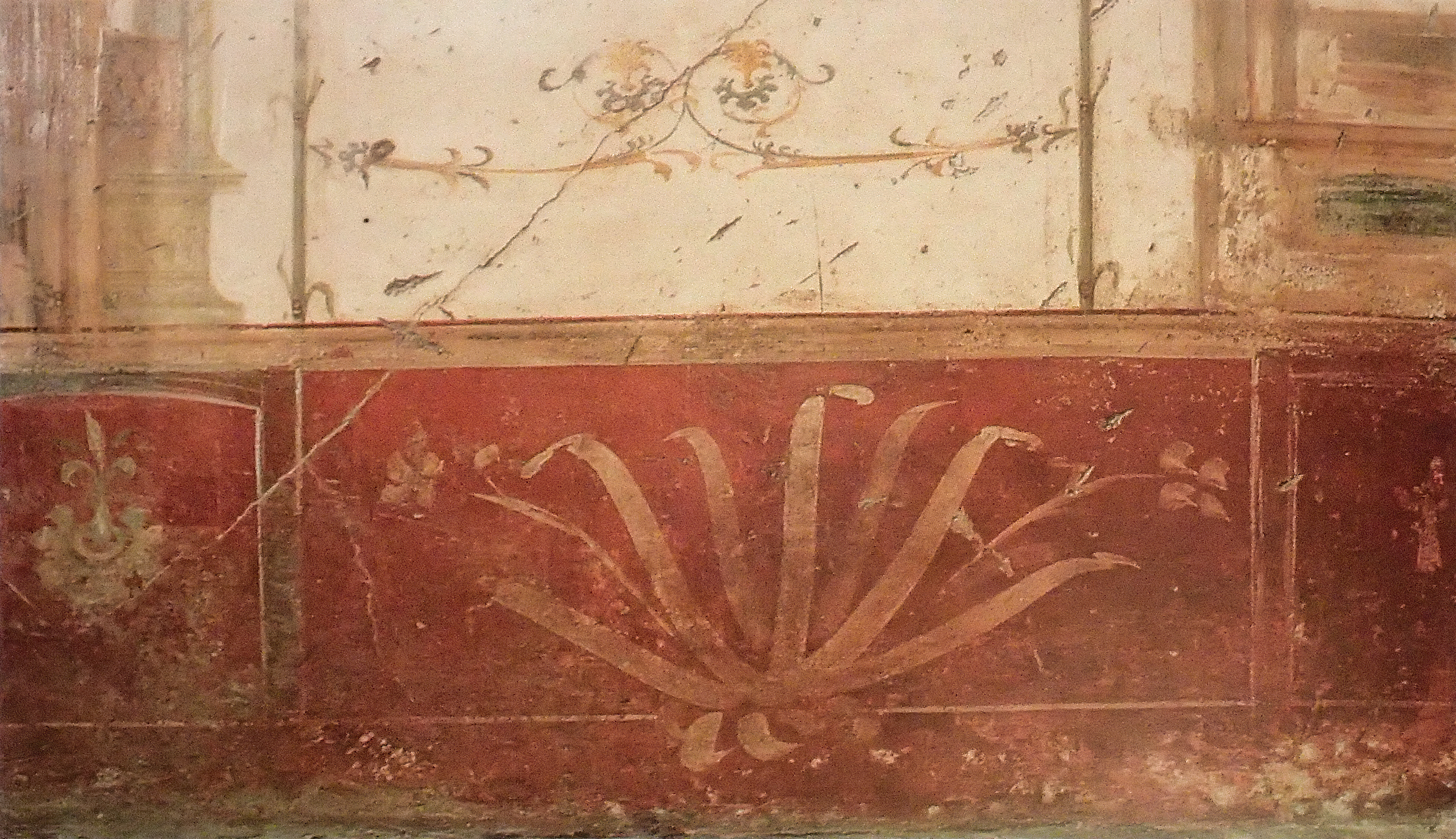
Room 9 North Wall Socle Right

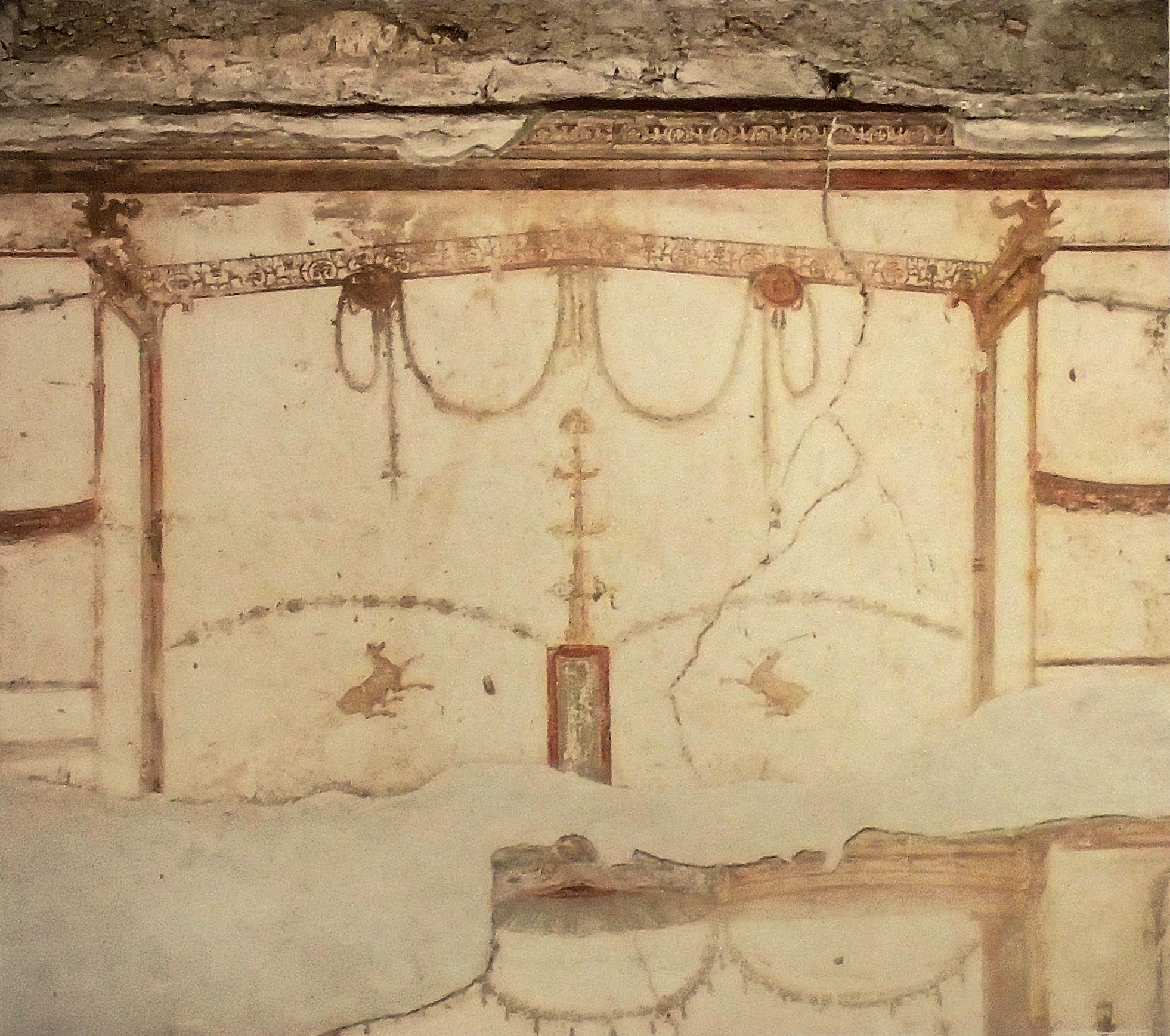
Room 9 North Wall Upper Zone

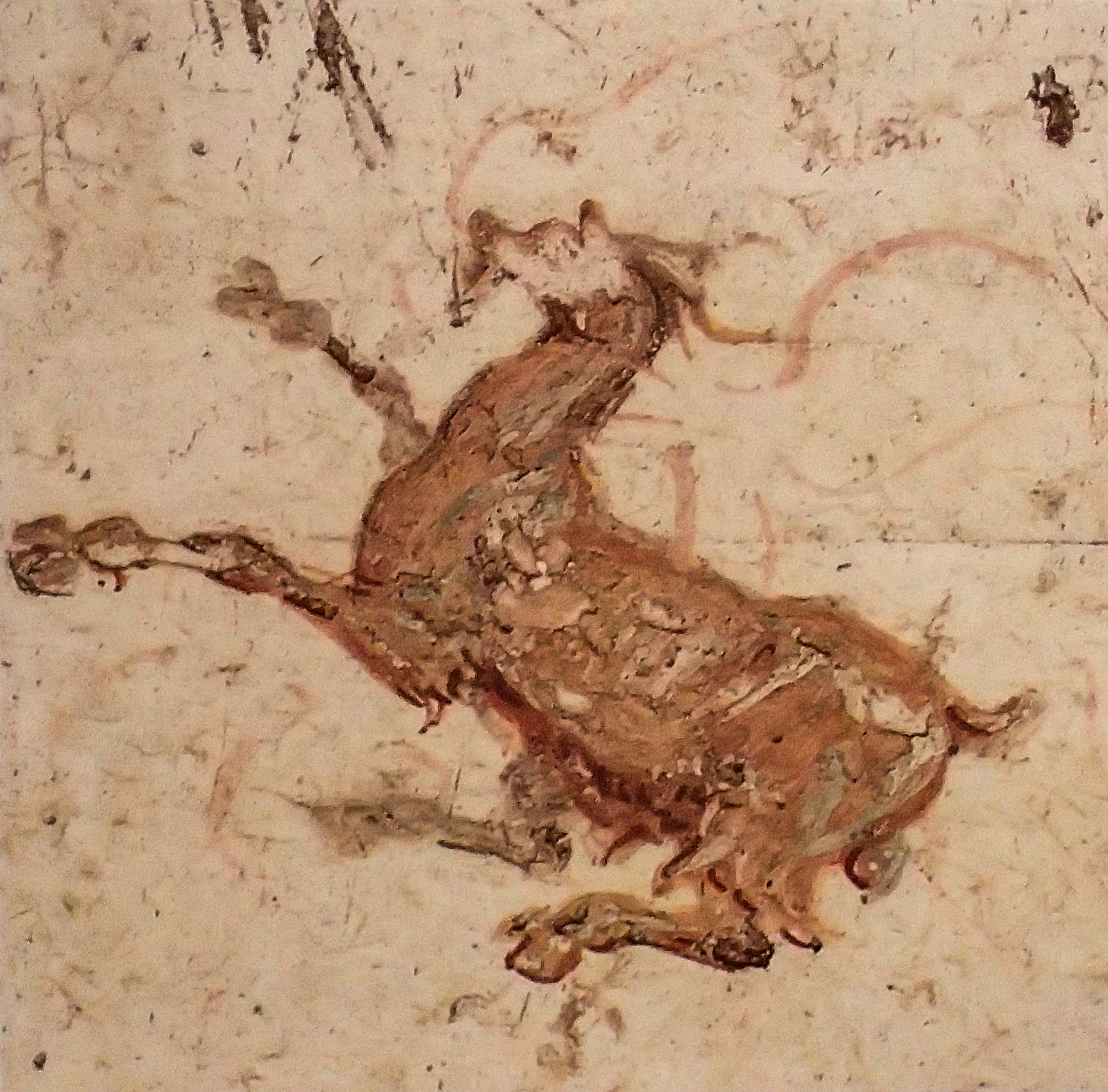
Room 9 north wall upper zone middle goat figure

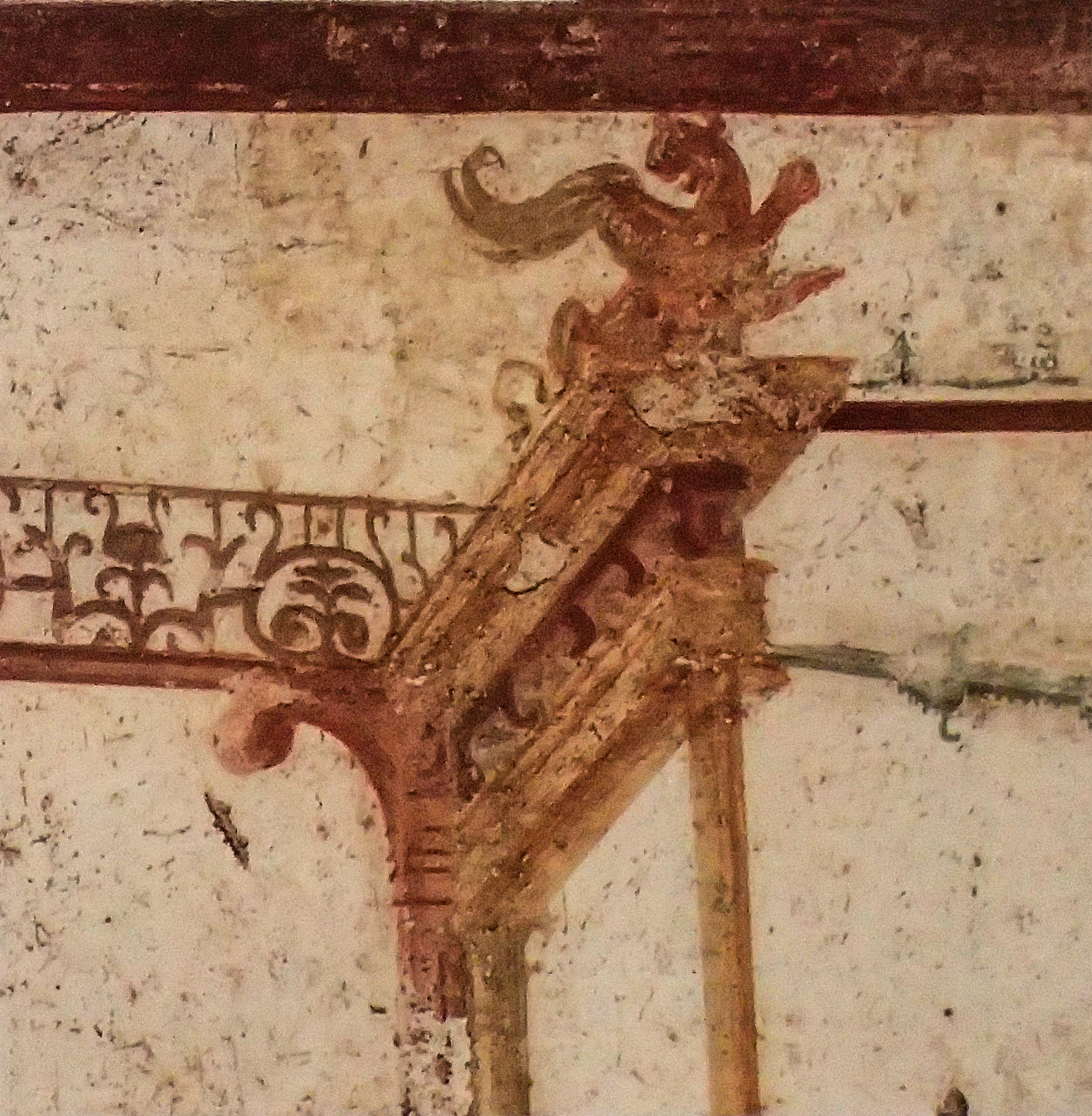
Room 9 north wall upper zone right griffin perched on architecture

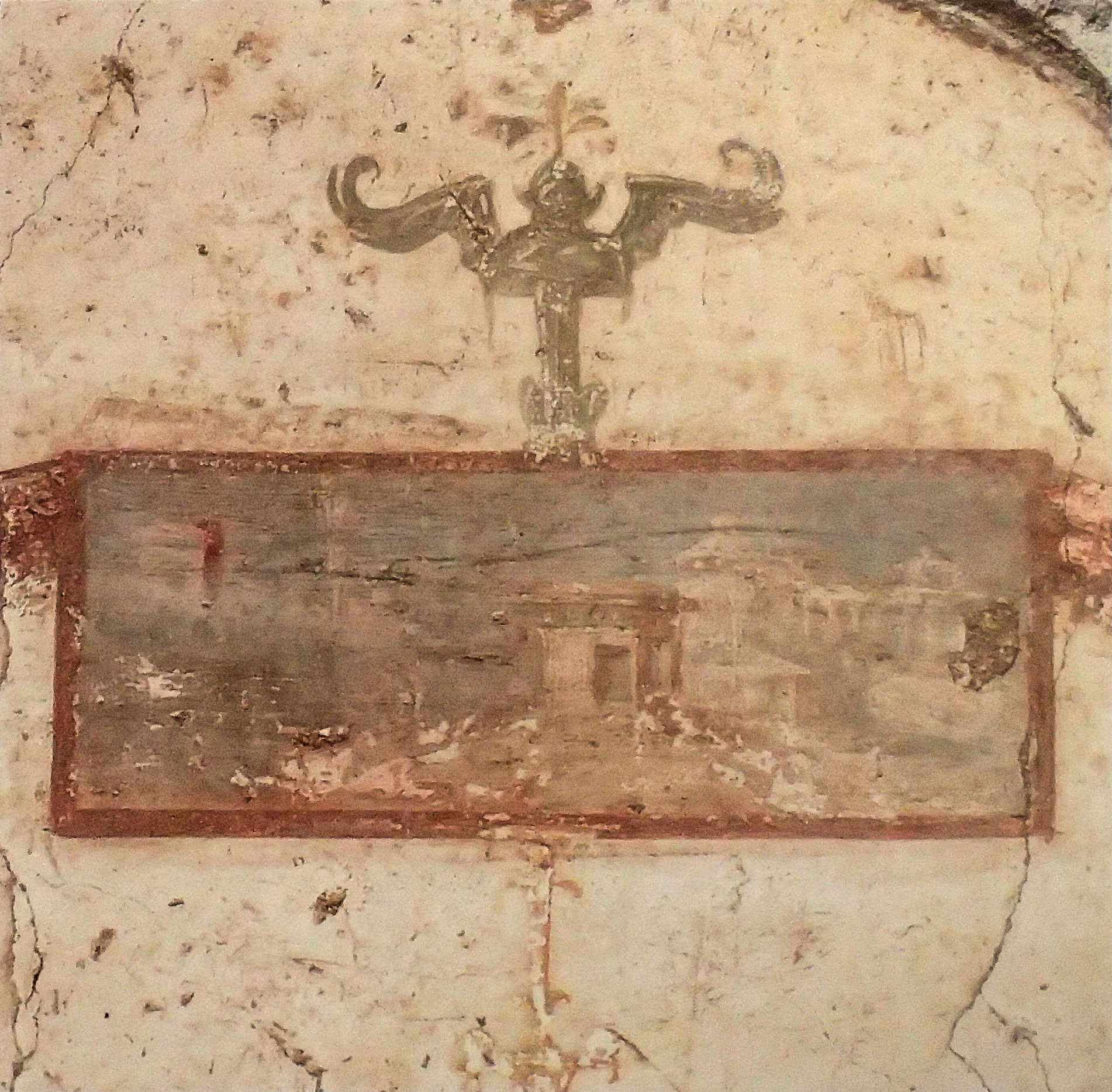
Room 9 north wall upper zone right panel

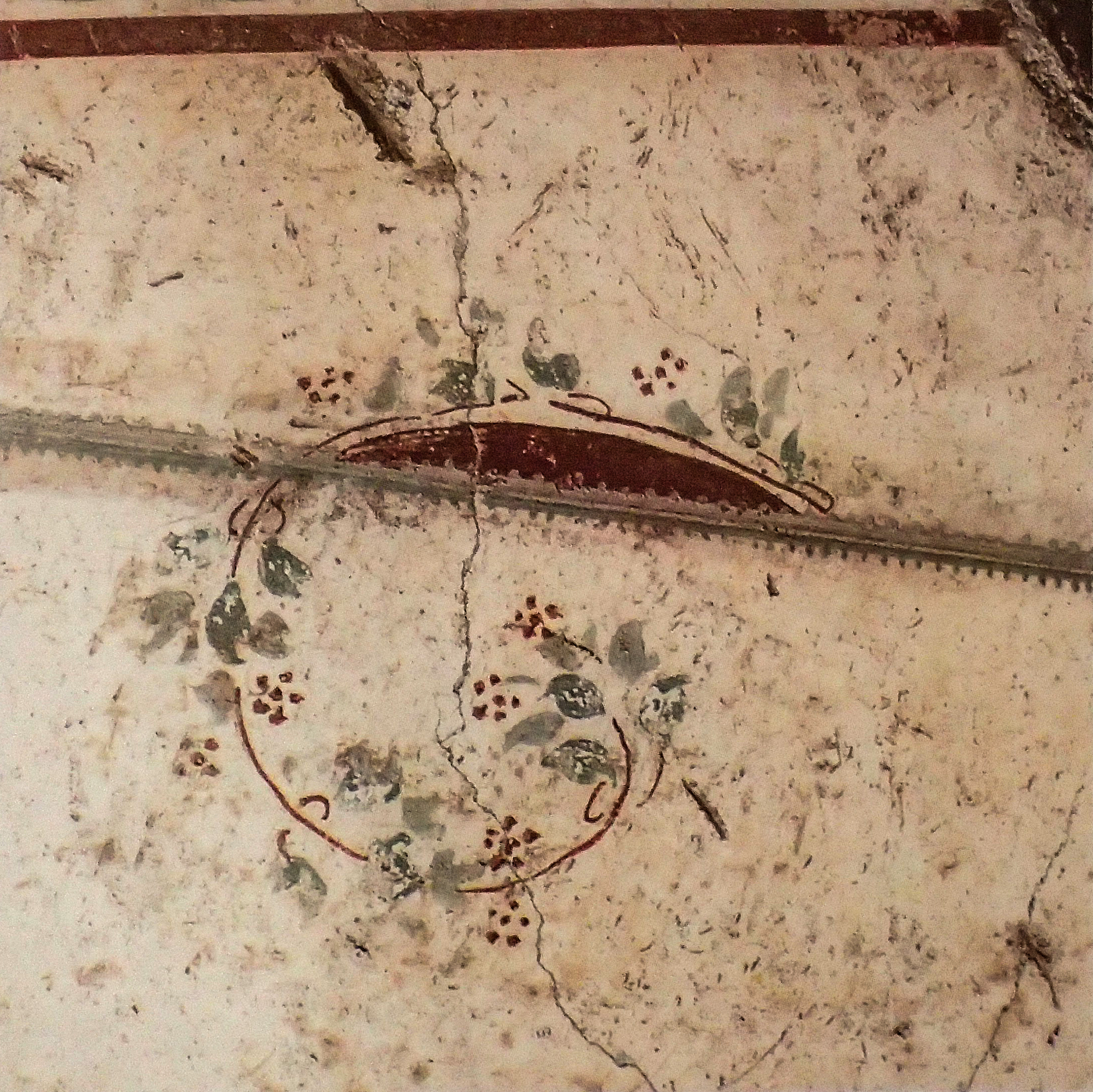
Room 9 north wall upper zone right side

Room 10 – Pseudo-peristyle: The space is divided into an open garden area and a columned porticus which encloses the garden to the north and east. An original shallow water channel made of coarse cocciopesto in front of the porticus that widens into a basin at the corner column has been extensively patched with modern concrete. The tufa columns of the Doric order are stuccoed and painted with a smooth red base. The porticus pavement is heavily damaged light gray, highly calcareous and very brittle lava pesto with irregularly placed, large white tesserae and red brick pieces. There is no evidence of flooring around the fountain in the open garden area and it is assumed it was planted.

The north wall of the peristyle space includes entrances to rooms 15, 14, and the stairwell 13. There are small rectangular windows above the doorways to 15 and 14. The north and west walls of the peristyle are painted in the Fourth Style with an ochre dado, black ground middle zone painted with architectural elements, and structural landscapes painted in the upper zone. The dado is embellished with mythical sea creatures. The east wall is interrupted by entrances to room 12, almost full width entrances to the Triclinium 11 and tablinum 8, and to corridor 16. The south and west walls are constructed of opus incertum and covered with Fourth Style plaster. The south wall is painted with a large mural of a port scene. Little remains of painting on the east wall. Between doors to rooms 12 and 11 in the dado is a horned yellow sea monster in a long rectangular panel.

The temple-style fountain with a marble-clad basin and apsidal niche constructed of brick against the west wall is plastered and decorated with mosaic tiles and sea shells. Scenes depict cavorting dolphins and colorful parrot-like birds. Originally, water spouted from the open mouth of a comic theatre mask depicting an old bearded man in the apse but the marble sculpture is no longer present. Above the water spout depicted in mosaic is a river god. Behind the fountain, a mural of a garden with trees and fluttering birds behind a white fence is painted in a central panel within a red ground above an ochre dado demarcated by white columns with red bases. To the left of the fountain is a badly faded landscape of a columned temple with round two-level tower. To the right of the temple is another landscape with multi-storied structures. The ocher dado is punctuated with panel paintings of mythical sea creatures and dolphins.

== Gallery: Peristyle and Mosaic Fountain (Room 10) ==
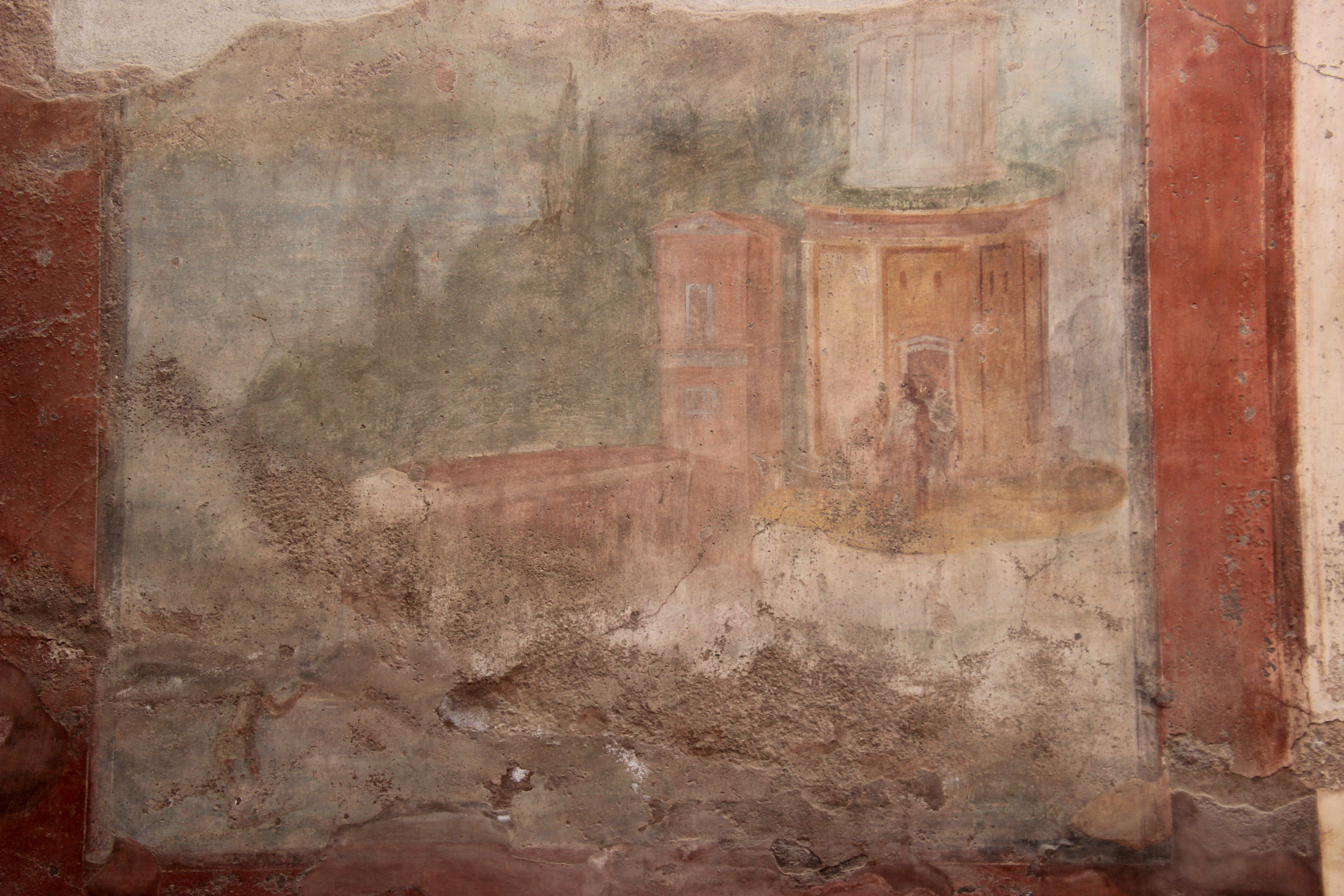
Circular temple west wall left side

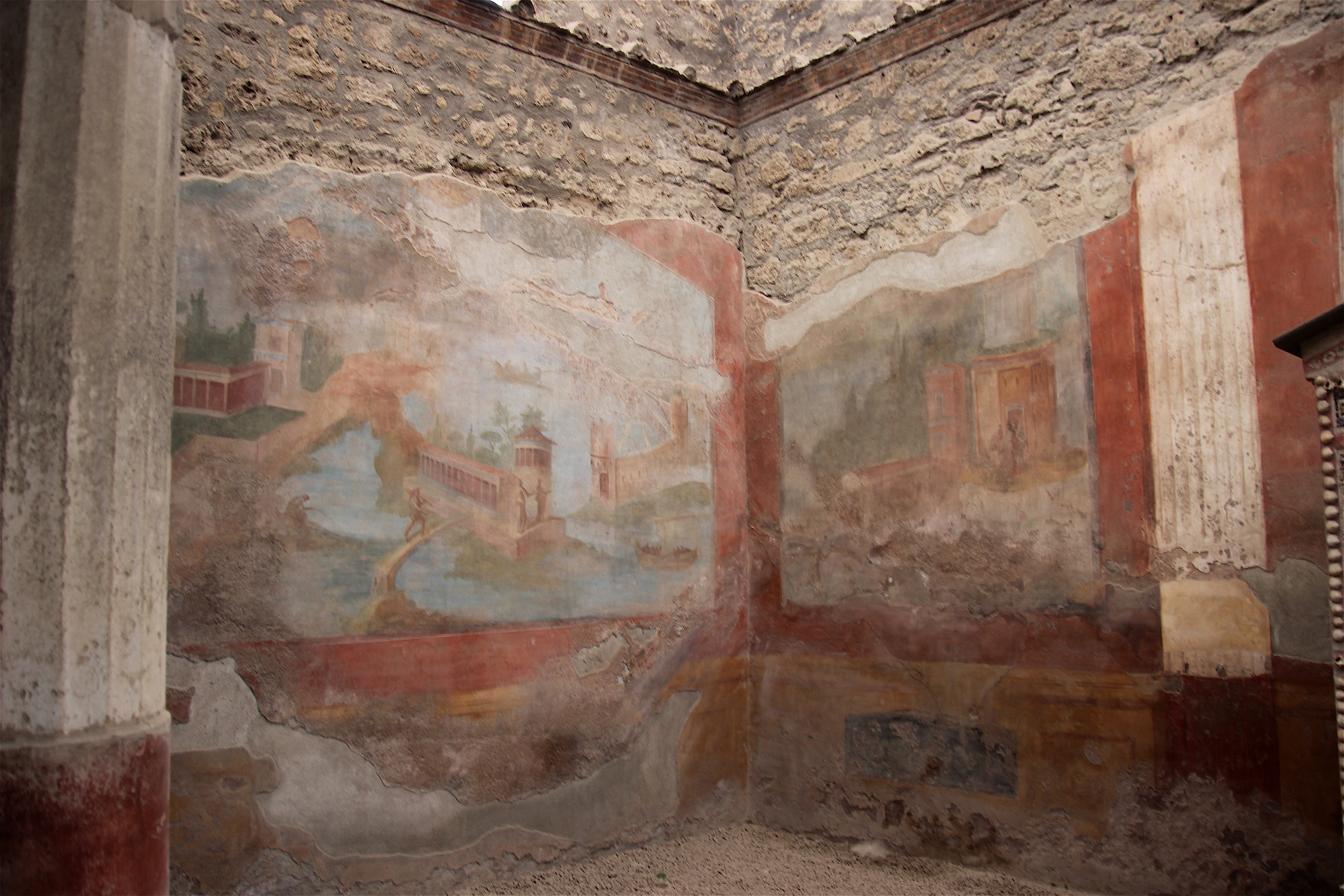
Landscape frescoes on south and left side of west wall of peristyle

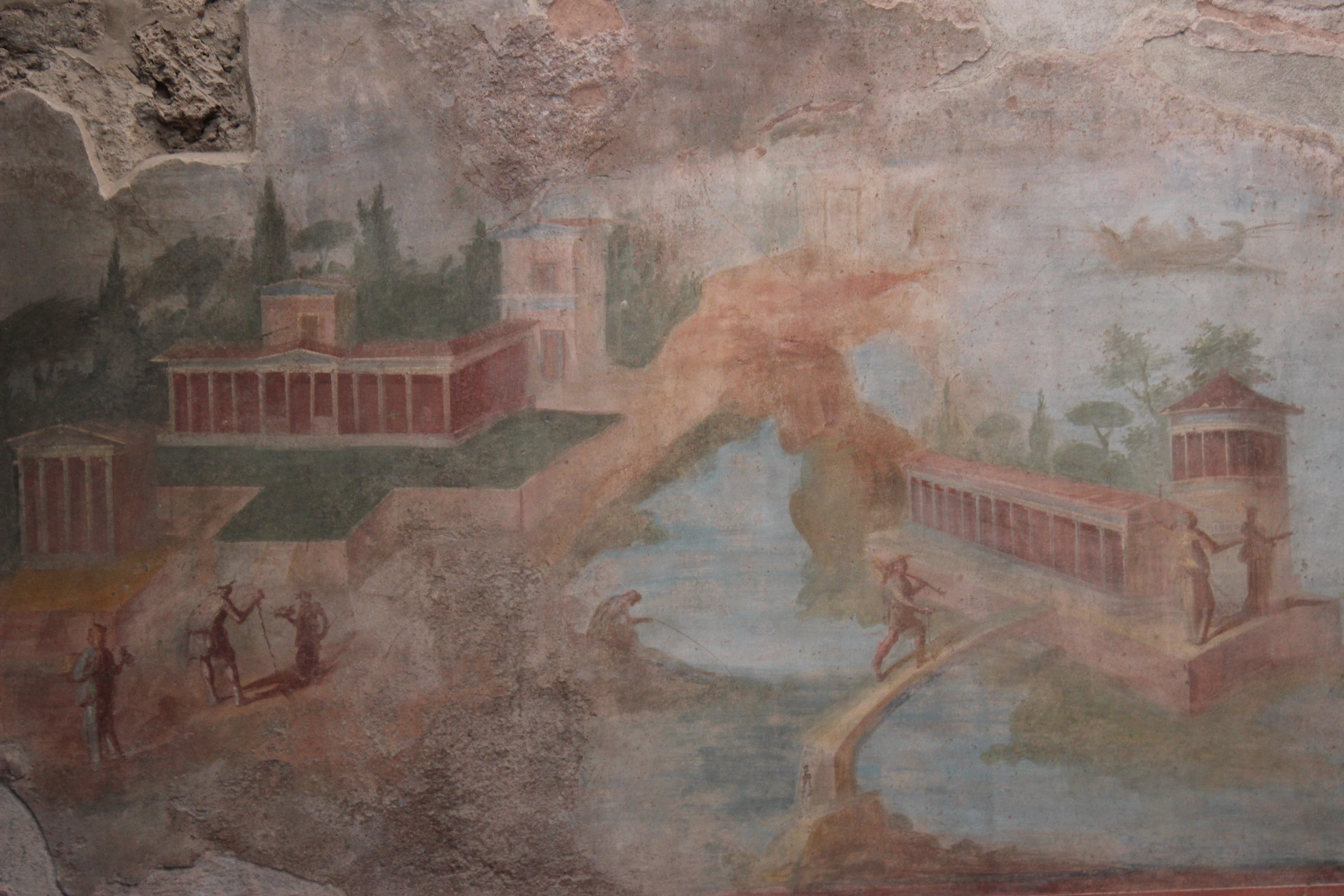
Fresco of port on south wall of peristyle

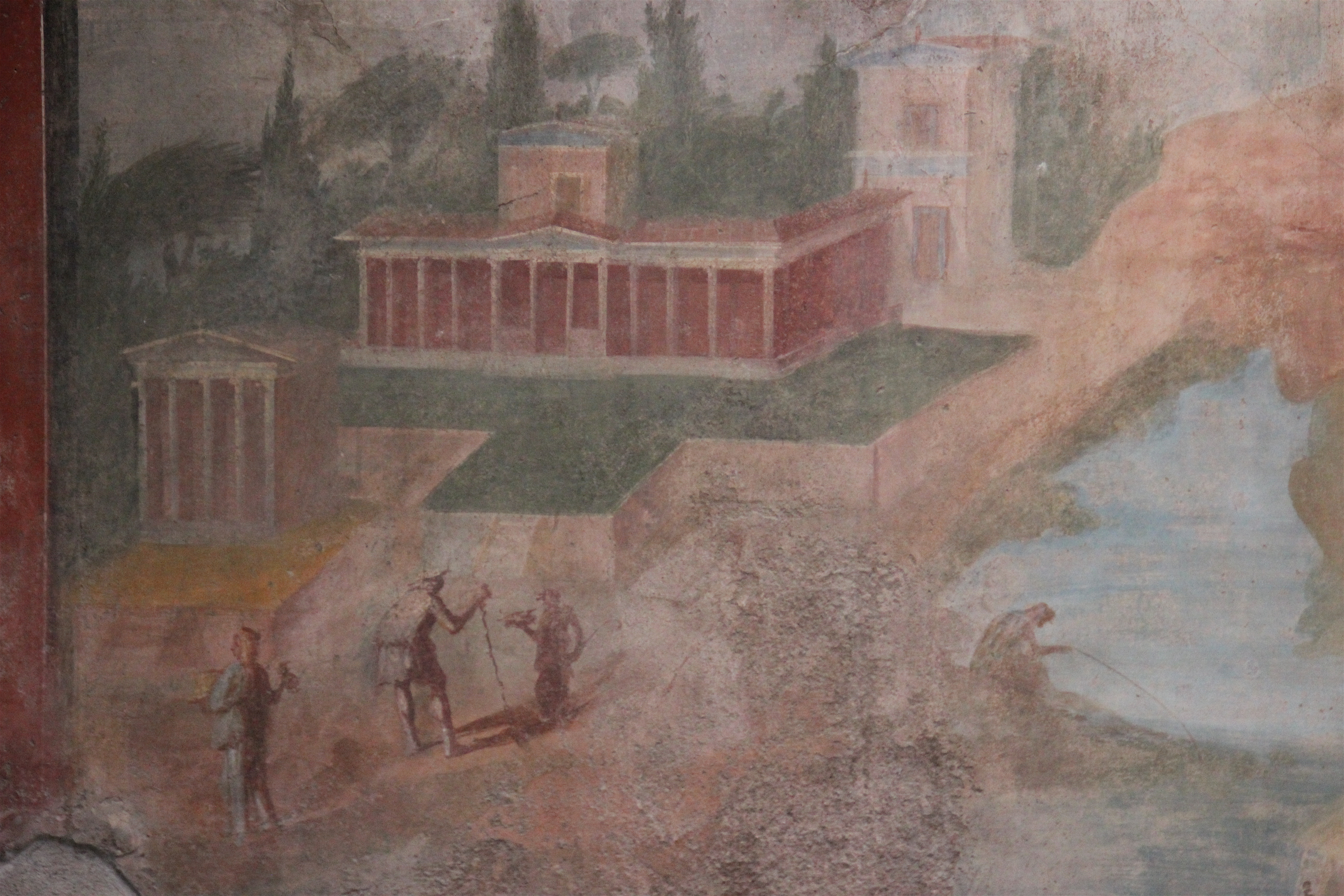
Closeup of landscape on south wall of peristyle

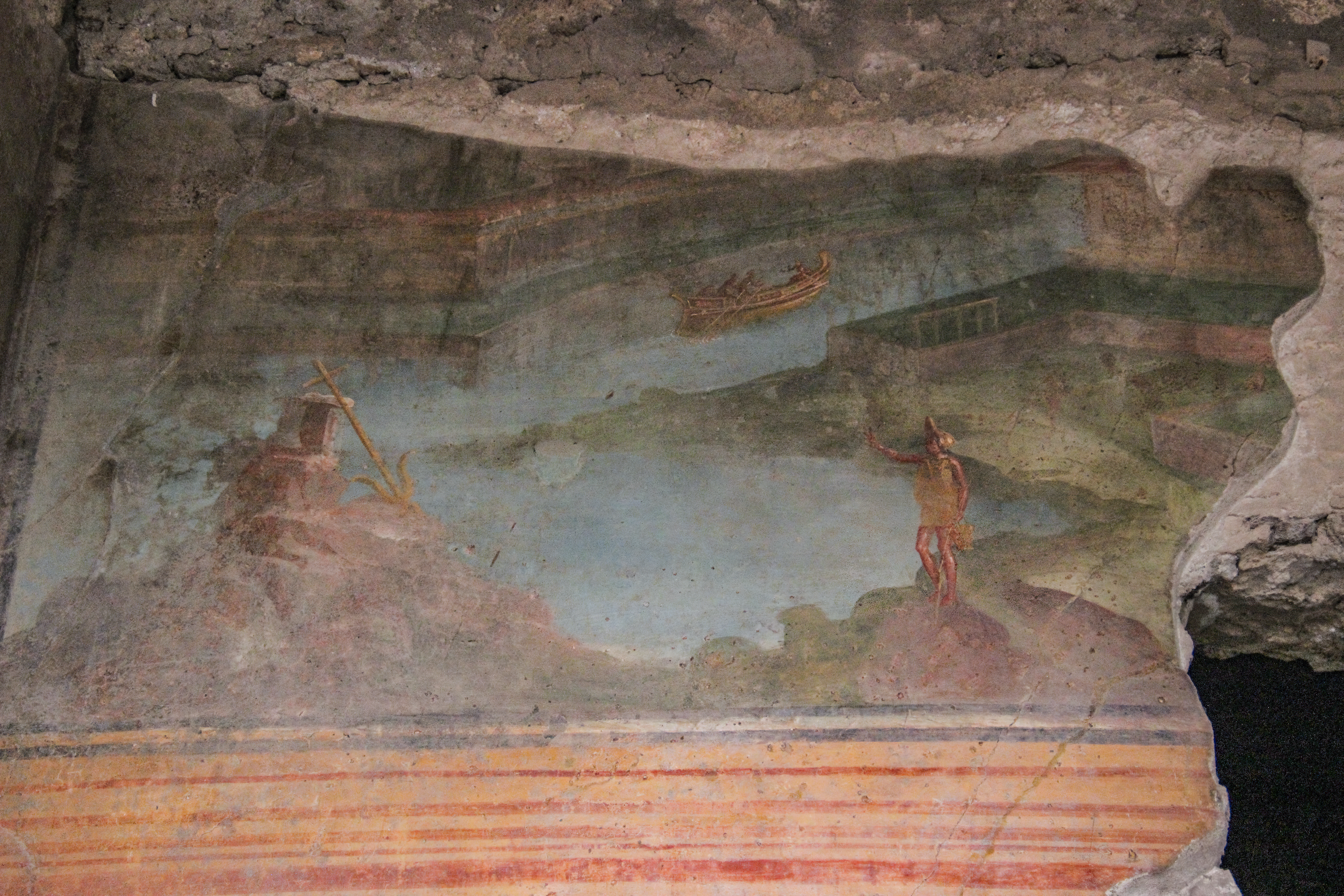
Fresco depicting port with human figure and rowboat on the north wall upper zone of the peristyle

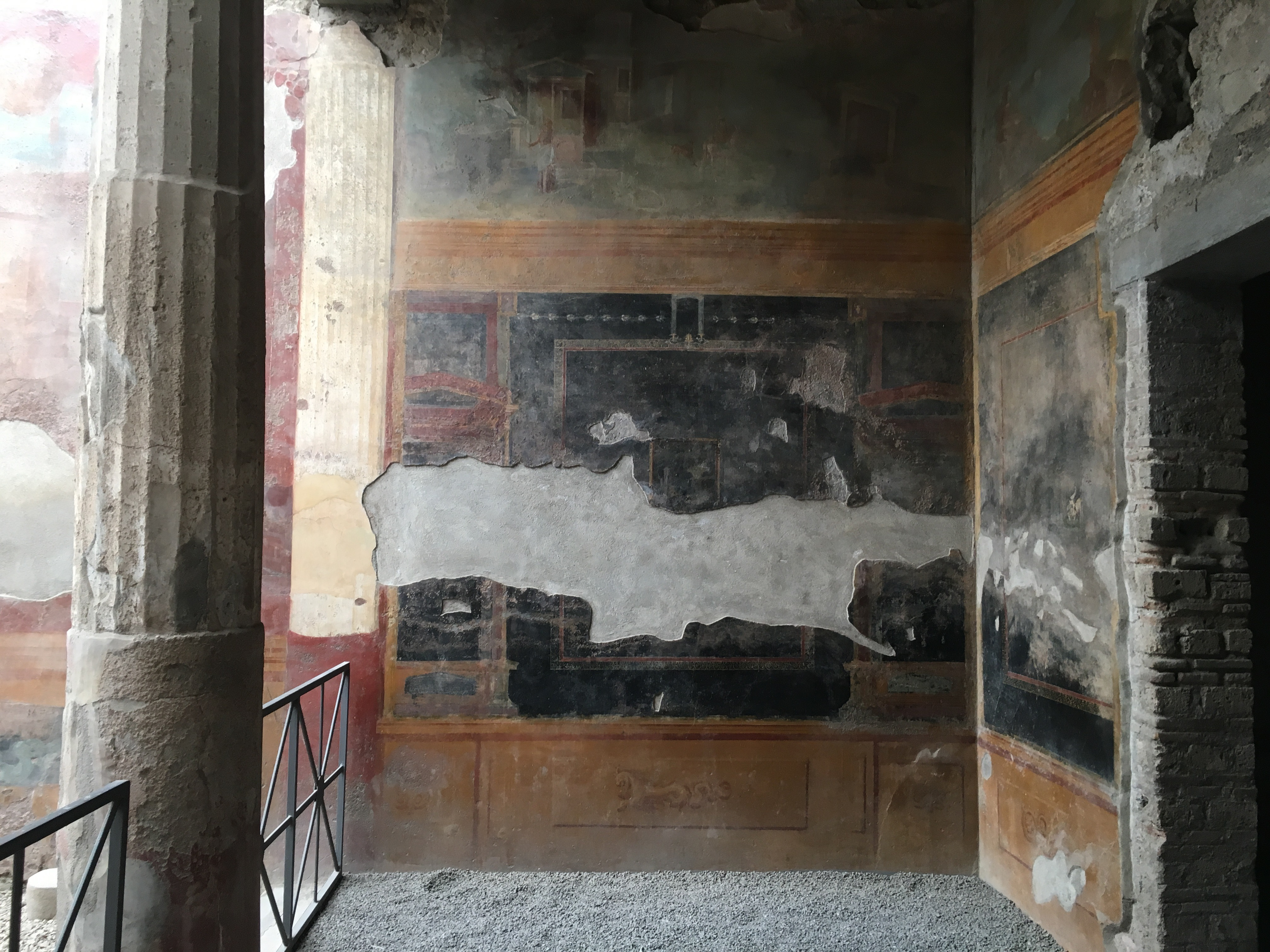
Fourth Style fresco with black ground on west wall of porticus

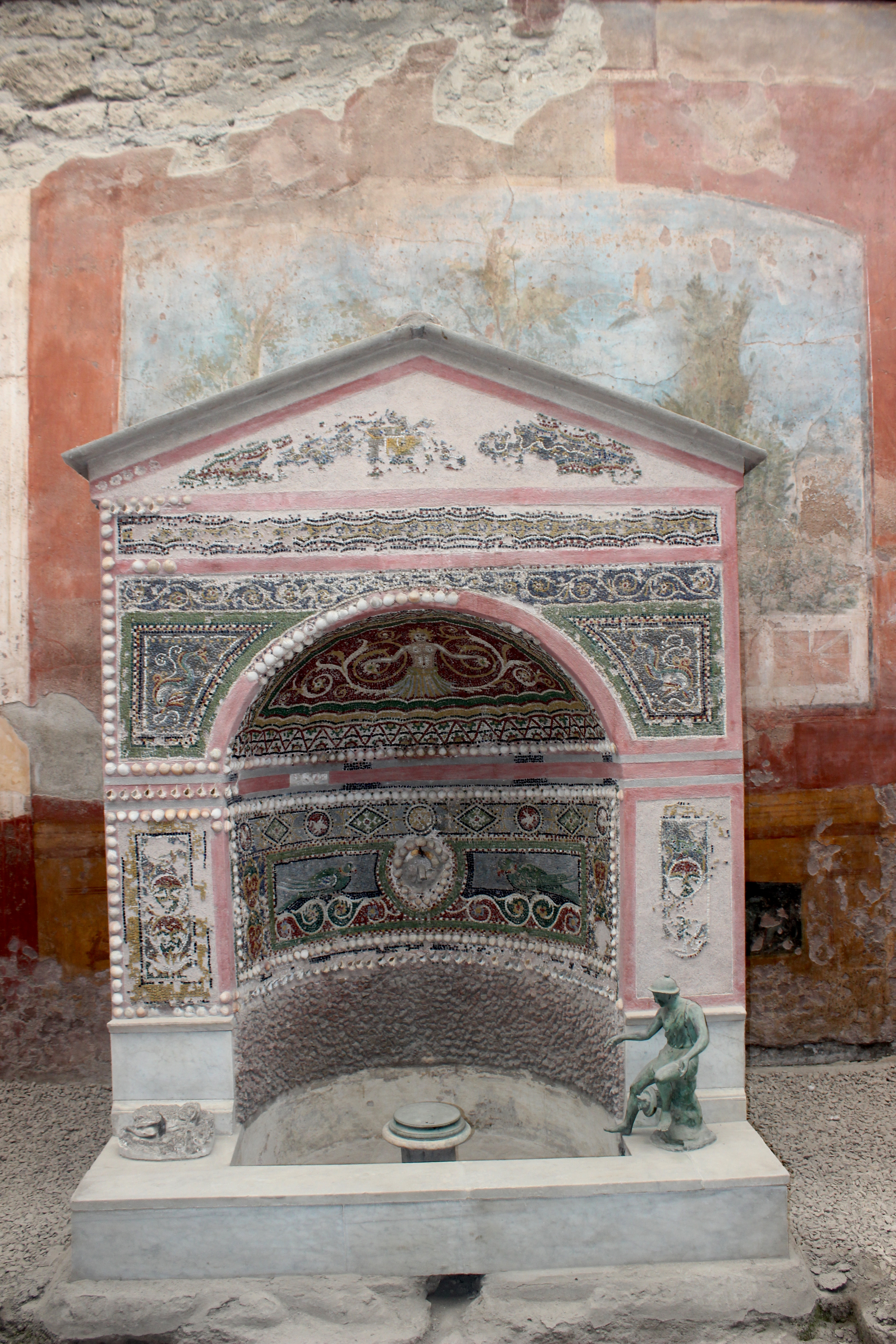
The apsidal temple-style mosaic fountain in the pseudo-peristyle

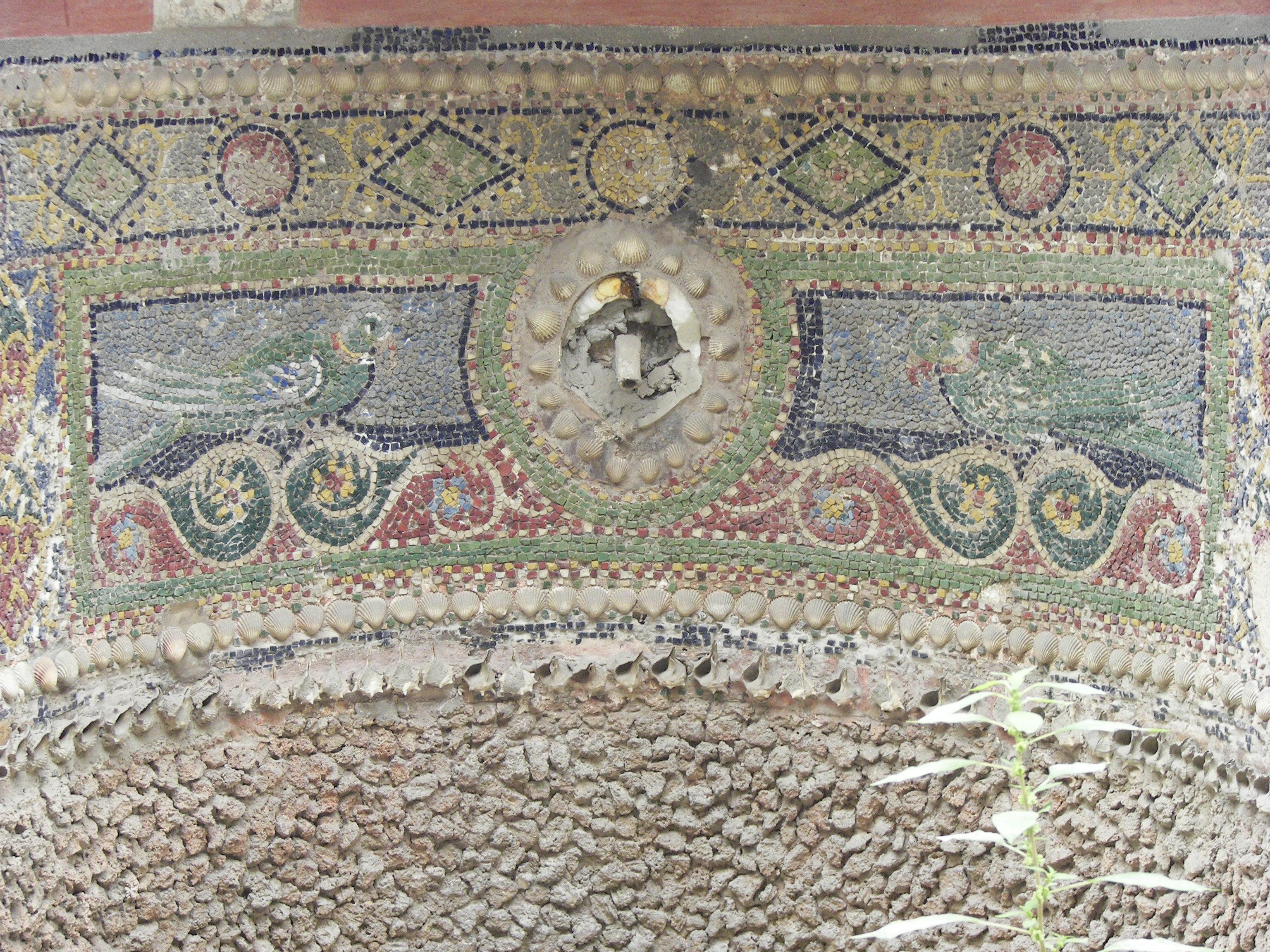
Parrot-like birds and fountain fixture once covered by a tragic mask sculpture

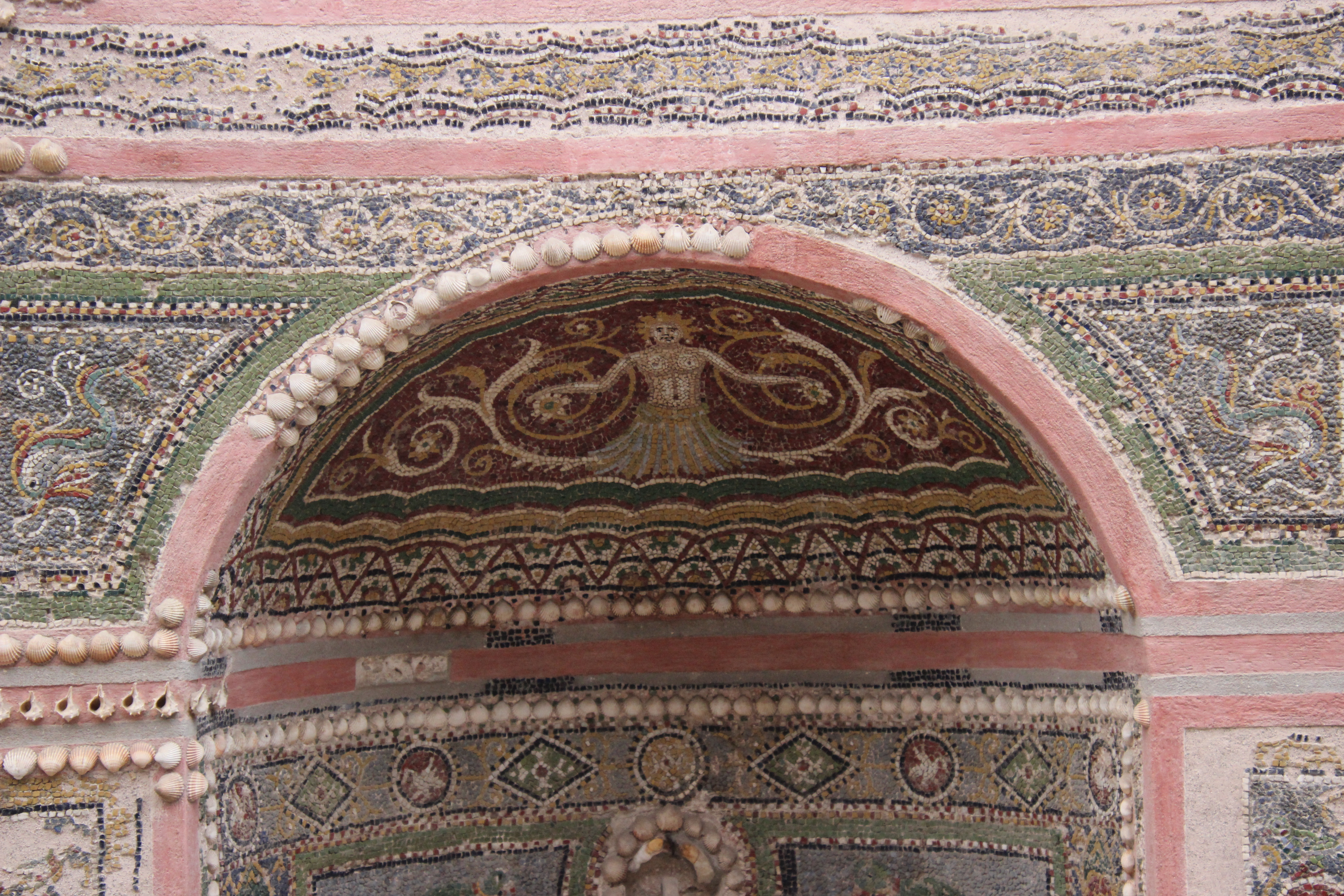
Closeup of river god

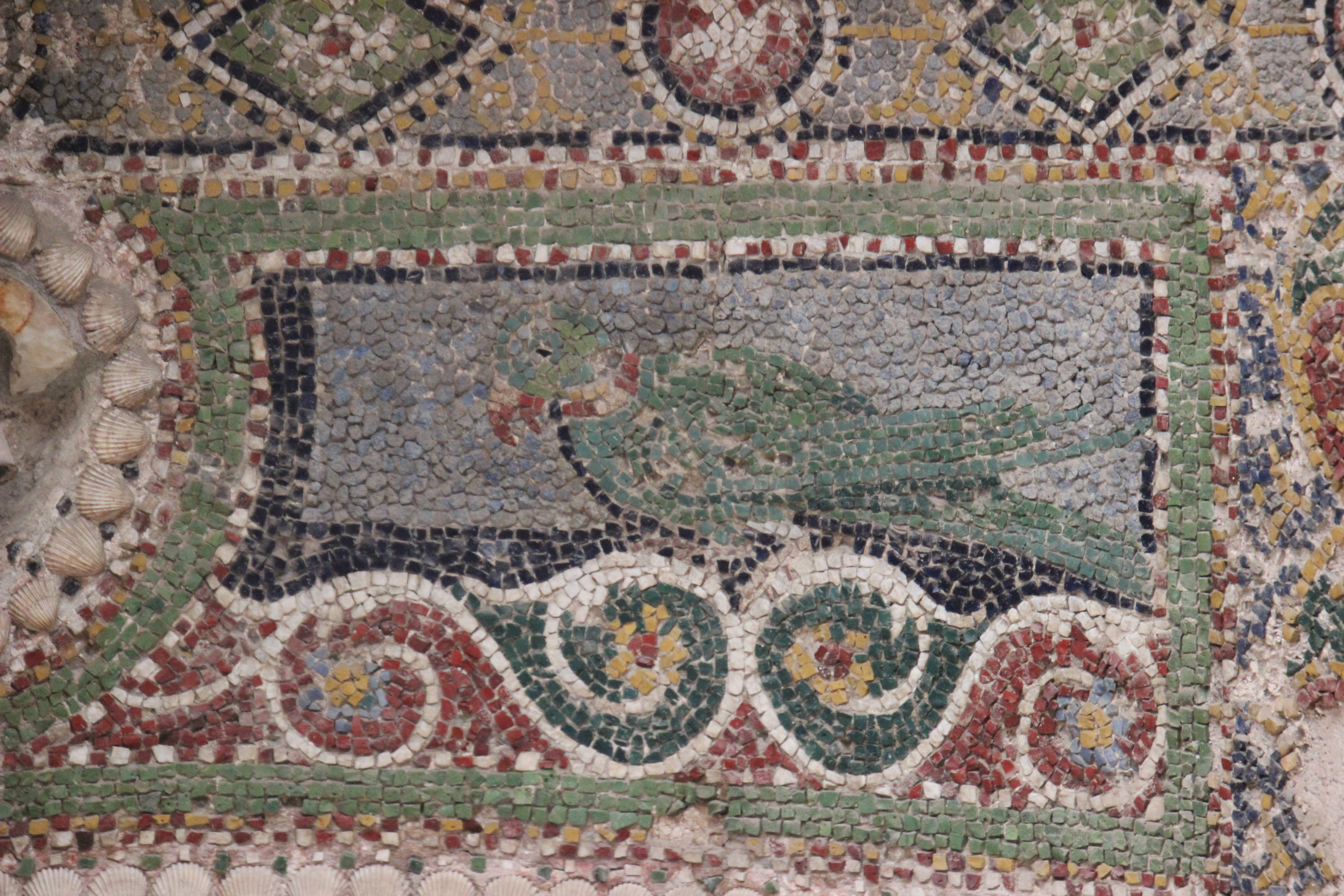
Closeup of bird

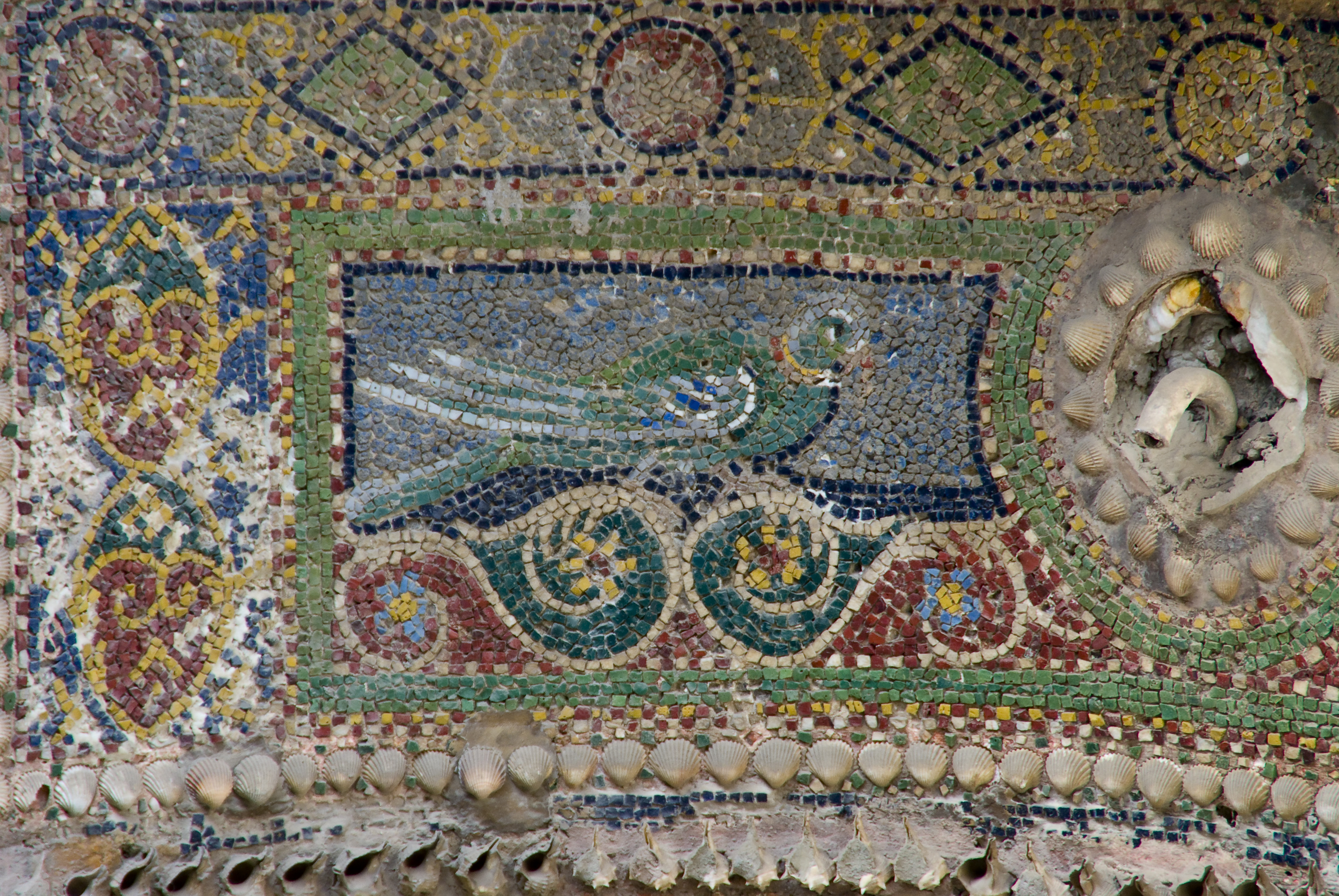
Closeup of mosaic bird

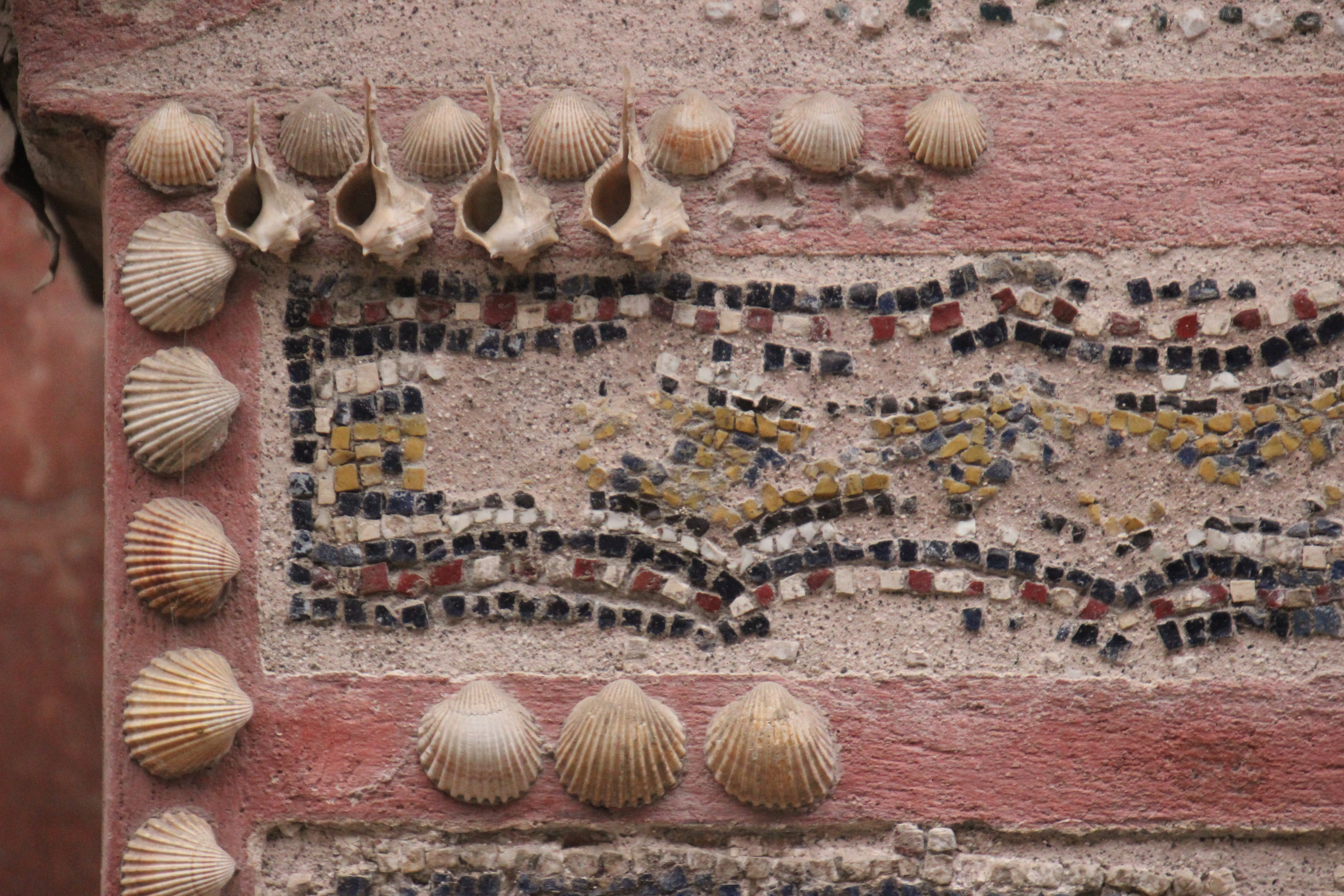
Closeup of sea shells used in mosaic

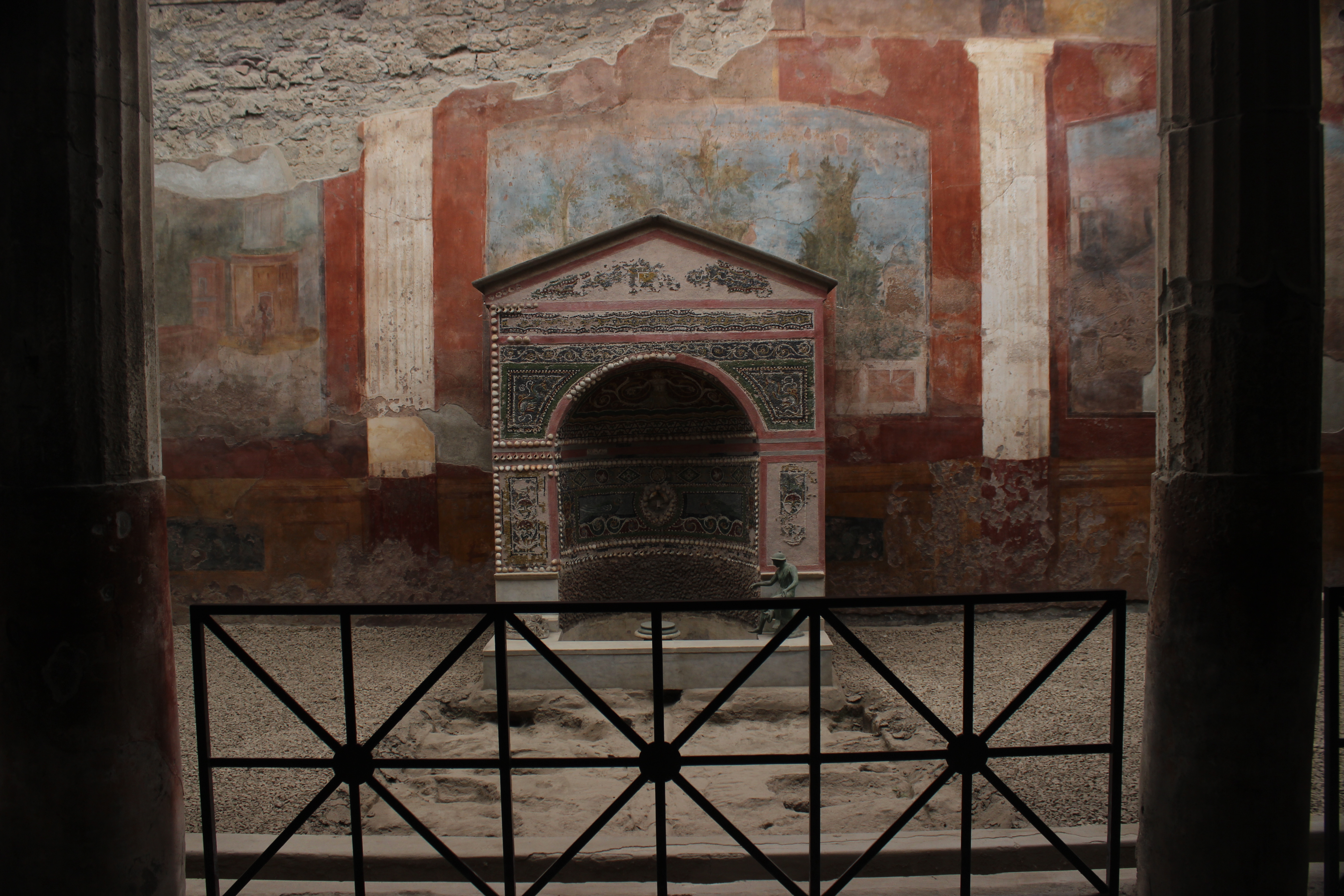
Fountain with flanking murals

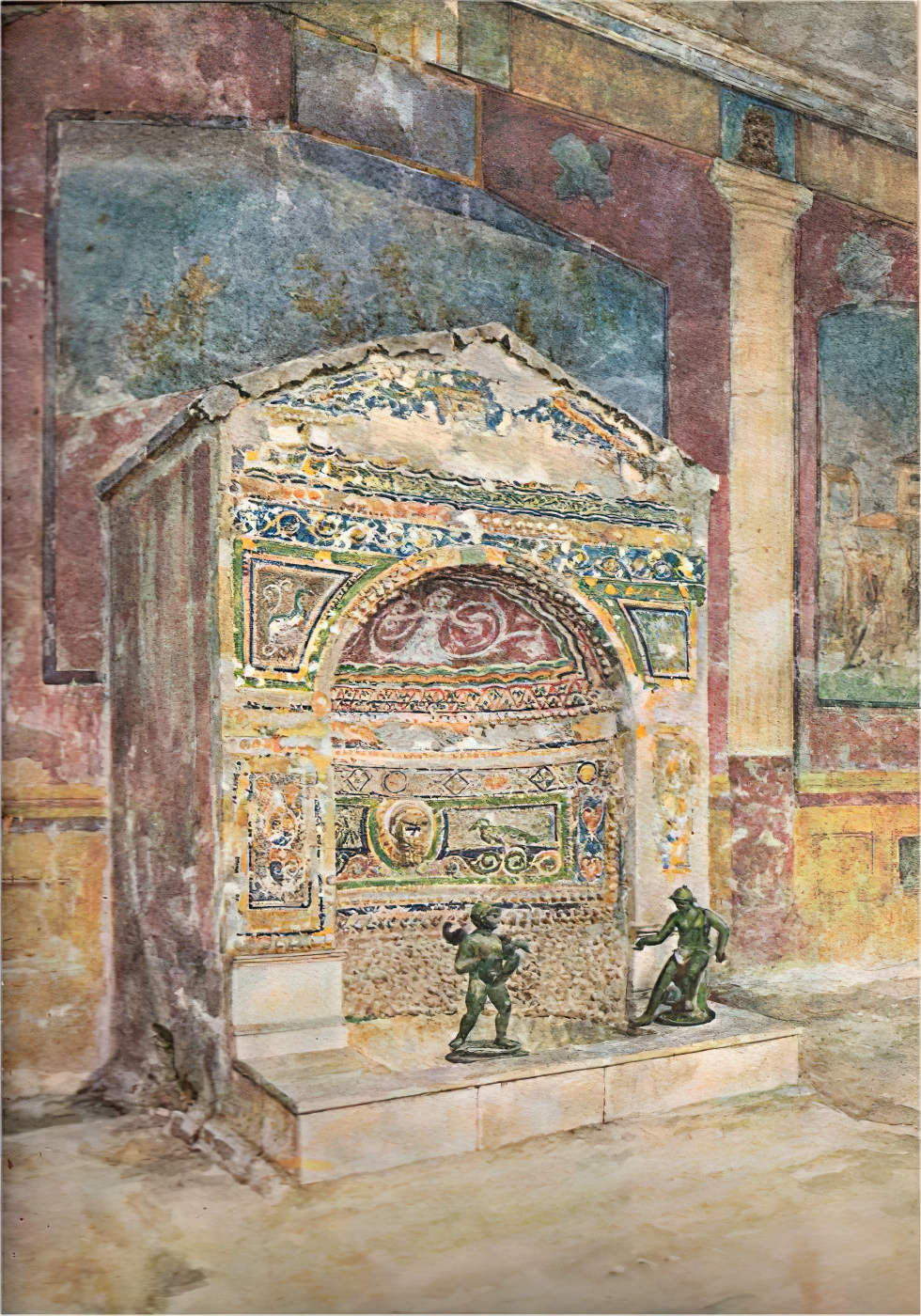
Watercolor of fountain before 1927 by Luigi Bazzani

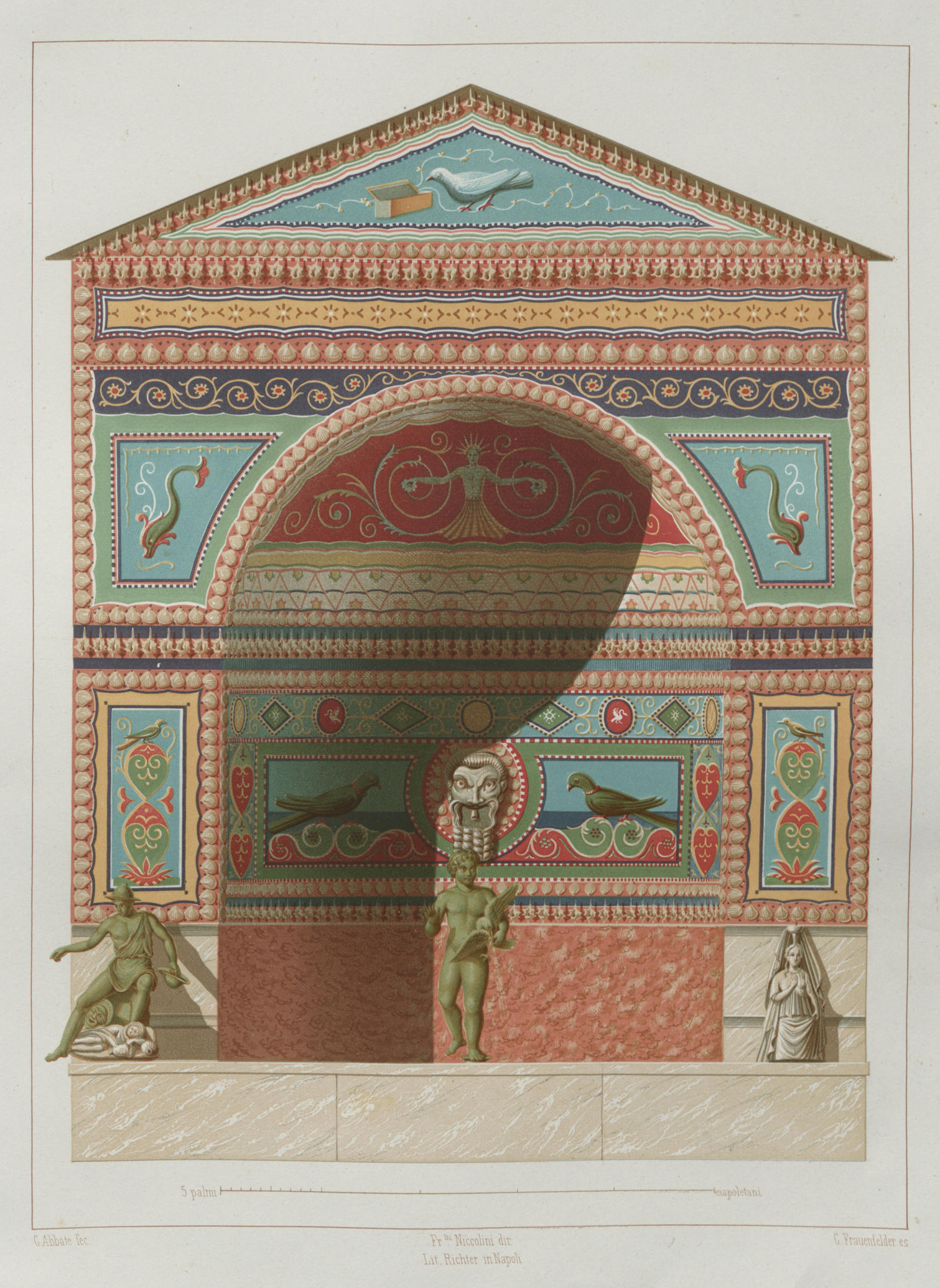
Mosaic by Giuseppe Abbate and G Frauenfelder 1854

Room 11 - Triclinium: Constructed of opus vittatum with tuff and limestone ashlars; there are only remnants of original wall plaster. The dado is no longer preserved. The middle zone contains a few fragments of white-ground. A small rectangular predella painting depicts three even-toed ungulates being attacked by two predators. The chamber is paved in a black and white mosaic only preserved in small fragments. One of the larger fragments consists of two rows of black stripes separated by a wide white stripe.

Room 12: This chamber is roughly plastered with a flat ceiling. Construction techniques range from opus incertum with limestone, tuff and red and black lava used in the north wall to opus vittatum made of hewn limestone and tuff blocks used in the west wall. It is paved with fine-grained gray lava pesto studded with colored stones and occasional black and white tesserae. The only indication of decoration is an early plaster fragment with yellow paint remnants at the very bottom in the center of the south wall.

Room 13 – Staircase and corridor: Double-flight of stairs divided into two halves by a wall running in a west–east direction. The corridor connects pseudo-peristyle (10) with both the staircase and room 21. The floor is paved with well-preserved screed with a high lime content identical to that in room 21. On the west face of the wall between the stairwells is a pink fine plaster, the finishing surface at the time of the eruption. Beneath it is a layer of brick-red plaster. The corridor is finished with a fine pink plaster base with white lime wash above it.

Room 14: A plastered barrel-vaulted chamber decorated in the Fourth Style; The room is paved with lava pesto, preserved in only a few places. The room was originally painted with a red-ground dado and black-ground middle and upper zones. However, the upper zone and the upper section of the middle zone are practically completely destroyed. Only fragments of ornate vegetal-accented borders that once defined the panels remain, with the exception of the southwest corner where to the left yellow eagles with wings spread flank a turquoise roundel in the center of which sits a green gemstone set in yellow and to the right, a pair of yellow dolphins on either side of a vegetal ornament. Traces of rectangular frames indicate center panels once contained pinakes.

Room 15: A plastered barrel-vaulted chamber decorated in the Fourth Style with red dado and black-ground middle and upper zones once topped with decorative stucco molding. Wall construction consists of predominantly limestone opus incertum. The room is paved with lava pesto. Although nineteenth century German artist Wilhelm Zahn reproduced the north and east walls in their entirety (see gallery), the only painting still remaining as of 1995 was in the dado and lower quarter of the central zone. Zahn himself reported the decorations were heavily damaged, though, so it is suspected Zahn supplemented his paintings with those found in other rooms. As portrayed by Zahn, the red dado on the north wall has framed recessed panels with depictions of hippocamps in the side panels and a gorgoneion flanked by griffins in the center panel. The side panels of the main zone are framed with spears and garlands. The left panel has a floating buck deer and the right panel has a floating griffin both facing the center panel. The center panel features a small floating landscape with a bull. The upper zone panels are framed with architectural supports with an aedicula in the central panel containing a candelabra topped with an eagle. Griffins perch on supports in both upper left and right side panels and white doves looking towards the center panel are perched on railing in the lower left and right side panels as well. Vegetal garlands are draped across all three upper panels.

Fragmented remains of the dado on the south wall appear to be similar to that on the north wall except the sea creature is without wings. On the east and west walls, the center panel of the dado features a mask of Oceanus with beard, long hair, pointed ears and horns. The mask is flanked by two buck-headed sea monsters. The side panels of the dado include winged Gorgon heads. The middle zones feature architectural structures in the side panels and a center zone with a colorful bird clutching a stalk of wheat surrounded by a floral garland entwined around two spears with small birds perched along the shafts.

Room 16: Hallway between Atrium 2 and Peristyle 10; Predominantly constructed of limestone ashlars covered by plaster; the extensively restored chamber is paved with light grey, heavily calcareous screed on a base of colored stone material that continues into the garden's porticus.

Room 17: Atrium with primary access from fauces opening into Entrance 24 of the Via di Mercurio; The room is primarily constructed of plastered opus incertum with limestone ashlar doorways. A square impluvium with a bottom made of white travertine chips rolled into a fine cocciopesto is in the center of the room. The upper surfaces are faced with reddish plaster. It does not appear to have supplied a cistern. To the east of the impluvium, the lava pesto flooring is cut to accommodate a drainage channel that runs from the center of the eastern edge of the impluvium to fauces 26/27. The room is paved with gray lava pesto with regular rows of square white tesserae about 12 cm (4.7 in) apart.

The room is decorated in the Fourth Style although the plaster is badly faded and fragmented. The north and south walls are divided into three panels with a yellow panel in the center and red rectangular panels on the sides, which are separated from the black background by narrow green stripes. The panels are bordered with bands of foliage ending in volute tendrils at the corners. Remnants of slender gold candelabras similar to those reproduced by Nicolini in Room 25 can be seen (see gallery), though largely destroyed. A decorative stucco molding above the main zone retains fragments of red and yellow paint above a frieze of alternating, pendulous three-leaf clover and violet flowers. The remains of white stucco pilasters flank the left and right entrance to Tablinum 19, but only the northern pilaster still retains its acanthus leaves and a leaf wreath.

Room 18: This chamber is plastered with a barrel vault running north-to-south. The room is constructed of lava incertum with ashlars of tuff around the door opening into the atrium (room 17) and an inwardly bevelled window in the north wall facing the Via di Mercurio. It is paved with simple cocciopesto on a coarse-grained base. In the center of the room is the remains of an opus sectile mosaic with yellowish-reddish breccia in the middle and a piece of Cipollino marble, quarried on the Greek island of Euboea, on the eastern edge. The room is decorated in the Fourth Style with a simple red dado without embellishment. The white-ground main zone had two rectangular panels framed by red stripes and internally bordered with yellow stripes. The upper zone white-ground bordered by red stripes.

Room 19 – Tablinum: This room has been extensively restored in modern times. Now, the walls are only ancient up to a height of about 16 inches (410 mm). However, beam holes concreted over in early restorations then restored in 1971 indicate the room may have originally had a flat suspended ceiling with a flat barrel in the center. Archaeologists point to other examples in the triclinium in the Casa dell'Efebo and room (G) of the Casa della Soffitta. The room was paved with fine red cocciopesto on a base of larger pieces of brick. It was last painted red with white tesserae forming a fragmentary pattern with only part of a circle remaining.

Although the Fourth Style wall decorations are now weathered and heavily faded, enough color remains to indicate all walls have a black dado embellished with vegetal elements, rich blue main zones, and white ground upper zones. The center panels of the main and upper zones are separated from the side panels by ornate architectural structures. The center panel of the main zone and the side panels in the upper zones feature rectangular panel paintings. The side panels of the main zone are embellished with round medallions equidistant from each side. These decorations were documented by several different 19th-century artists. In 1828, Wilhelm Zahn painted the west wall. In the main zone the left side medallion depicts a wreathed Bacchante, with thyrsus and the right side medallion depicts a wreathed Bacchante with a crooked staff. The central panel painting of the main zone depicts a golden crown, an eagle, a golden wreath, a head on a plinth, and two serving pitchers. The two side panel paintings in the upper zone depict rural architecture with floating goats above. The upper zone is capped with a stucco molding decorated with rectangles enclosing bands of four-legged animals in the two outer red-ground fields, hippocamps, serpents, and other sea creatures in the inner blue-ground fields, two green fields with winged geniuses and a center shape with a red field and winged horse and griffin. Another 19th-century artist, Garnier, reproduced the same wall with the same attributes, reinforcing the accuracy of the Zahn painting.

In 1877, a painting of the north wall by Geremia Discanno was lithographed by Vittorio Steeger and published by Emil Presuhn. The two medallions in the side panels of the main zone feature paintings of Erotes and the central painting depicts tragic theatre masks. The panel paintings in the upper zone side panels again depict rural architecture, but with floating winged griffins above. The upper zone is capped with a stucco molding decorated with rectangles enclosing bands of dolphins in the blue inner fields and sea monsters in the red outer fields.

Room 20 – Kitchen: This space constructed primarily of limestone incertum has a door on the west wall to room 21 and a second door on the south wall to rooms 22/23. A stove and latrine are built against the north wall with the stove on the left and the latrine with a window above it on the right. A hearth sits in the northwest corner. Directly in the passageway to rooms 22/23 is a well shaft. Both the kitchen and latrine spaces are finished in a coarse white plaster above a reddish base.

Room 21: This space is constructed primarily of limestone incertum except for six rows of brick in the south wall beneath a row of beam holes indicating its original ceiling was flat. It is paved with lava pesto similar to the floor in corridor 13. Fragmented plaster still clings to the east and west walls, but none survives on the south and north walls, if any originally existed. A Doric tuff capital was found in this room but is thought to be one of the columns originally in garden (10).

Rooms 22/23: These rooms once enclosed a wooden staircase to the upper floor. The space is constructed of opus reticulatum and opus incertum walls with continuous rows of bricks. The uppermost smooth layer of the floor pavement no longer exists. All that remains is the sublayer of a highly calcareous whitish screed. The walls are plastered with a white zone above a pink-colored base.

Room 24 – Seasonal triclinium: This barrel-vaulted room, with a bevelled window in the east wall and decorated in the Fourth Style, has much of its original plaster intact although sunlight has faded paintings in the western half of the room. Stucco moldings, however, remain only on the east wall and the east end of the north and south walls. The white-ground middle and upper zones are above a dark red-ground dado. The room's smooth surface pavement is gone. Cocciopesto made of larger pieces of brick with irregularly scattered white chunks of travertine is now exposed. On the narrower east and west walls, the dado and middle zones are divided into three fields by two narrow architectural structures. The outermost fields of the dado contain dense perennial plants with yellow flowers. A lioness stands in the center field with garlands and a gold shield above her. Theatre masks are suspended within the architectural elements.

Below the window in the east wall is a rectangular still life of a lobster, an overturned basket of small fish, and a large fish flopping on a smooth surface as indicated by a reproduction of the painting made in the 19th century. It is barely discernible now. An aedicula in the left middle zone contains a vessel filled with garlands. The left upper zone of the east wall features a floating figure of a fluttering swan. Most of the rest of the wall is severely faded. The entire upper zone of the west wall is destroyed. In the outer fields of the middle zone are sirens, and a humanoid figure with vegetal appendages carrying a platter can be discerned in the central panel. The central field's painting is another still life depicting a brown bowl and round fruits, perhaps figs.

On the longer north and south walls, the dado is similar to that on the east and west walls except the lioness is replaced with a peacock and the dangling masks are replaced with a griffin on the right and a swan on the left. The main and upper zones contain architectural elements, garlands and ornate supports. The rectangular painting in the central panel of the north wall's middle zone depicts a boar and a basket of foods including figs. The painting in the central field of the middle zone is severely damaged and the subject cannot be determined.

Room 25: A plastered barrel-vaulted room decorated in the Fourth Style with the barrel running in the east west direction; The room is paved with coarse-grained cocciopesto embedded with irregularly scattered pieces of white travertine. The decoration is moderately preserved in the dado and the lower section of the central zone but the condition deteriorates towards the upper zone where the paint has largely peeled off. Wilhelm Zahn, however, reproduced the east wall and the north or south wall in 1827, but Zahn's watercolors show neither the door in the west wall nor the window in the east wall so this documentation is deemed questionable (see gallery). The north wall has a "bed niche" that could be for a bed or cabinetry and that section is repaired and only painted with repeating triangles filled with palmettes. The triangular pattern is not shown on Zahn's painting, so it is either the south wall with no bed niche or the portion of the north wall without the bed niche section. Photographs taken in 1995 confirm the dado is black, however, with white-ground middle and upper zones divided into three fields by stripes. According to Zahn, on the north or south wall, the dado's outer fields contain garland swags with suspended horns. The central field contains a fluttering bird of prey holding a ribbon. The outer fields of the middle zone contain a winged horse on the right and a winged griffin on the left (the lithograph of Zahn's painting has these figures reversed).

The central field contains an ornate stand topped by a theatre mask. The upper zone contains dancing swans in the outer fields and a tree topped with a bird behind a wall in an aedicula-like enclosure in the central field. A border strip at the top of the upper zone is divided into five rectangles. The two outer rectangles contain a feline, the two inner rectangles contain deer and the central rectangle bordered in green contains the head of Oceanus. On the east wall, the dado's outer fields are painted with two parallel horizontal border patterns. The central field contains the head of Oceanus. The middle zone contains floating bird figures within a vegetal framework in the outer fields and a vegetal stand topped by a sphinx in the central field. The upper zone contains two vegetal stands topped by flower sprigs beneath garlands supporting two birds in the outer fields. The central field with aedicula structure contains a dancing swan. German archaeologists Strocka and Frölich point out that the swan, in fact, does not exist as there is a window in this location. Above the aedicula is a red-bordered representation of serving ware.

Rooms 26/27 – Fauces connecting to Entrance 24: These plastered entry chambers consist of opus incertum supported by large limestone ashlars. Where present, the finished layer of flooring is lava pesto matching that of Atrium (17). Three diamond-shaped pieces of green slate in the passage to Atrium (17) designate a threshold bounded on east and west with a row of white tesserae. The pattern is disrupted by a drainage channel from Atrium 17's impluvium.

This space was decorated in the Fourth Style with a black-ground middle zone and white ground upper zone above a red dado. The middle and upper zones are chipped and significantly weathered however. Designs on the red base include broad-leafed perennials and lily-like ochre flowers alternated with plants with light green, narrow, tapered leaves with similar flowers (see gallery). A square yellow panel bordered by green and dark yellow stripes consumes most of the middle zone's central panel. Remains of vegetal candelabras, green and yellow leaf wreaths, and plant buds and tendrils can be discerned as well. The center panels of the middle zones of both north and south walls are badly faded but contain wide-framed rectangular panel pictures. On the north wall a rural villa can be seen with a three-columned porticus and a multi-storied wing. The corresponding painting on the south wall, however, has been destroyed. The white-ground upper zone is painted to represent large masonry blocks defined by red lines.

== Gallery: Rooms 14–27 ==
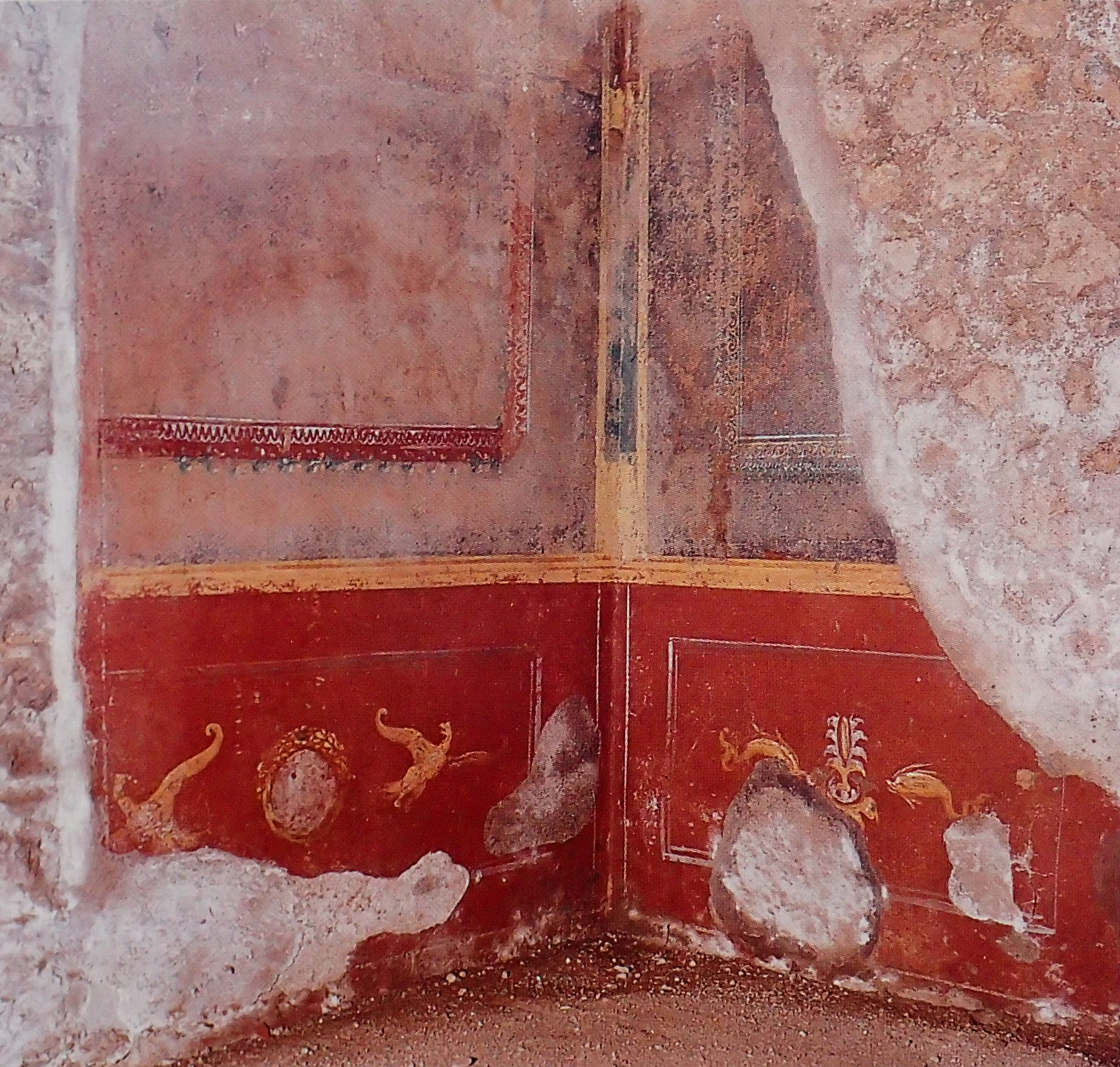
Room 14 Southwest corner with birds and dolphins in red dado

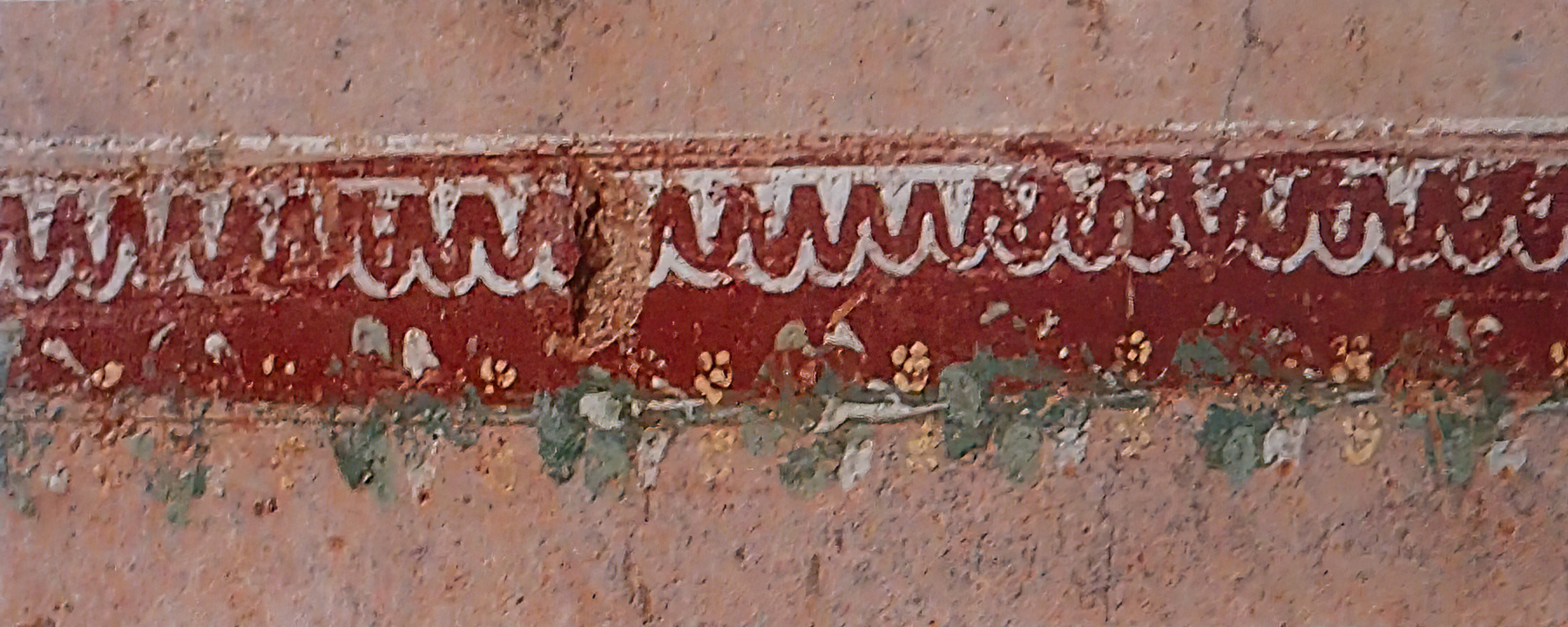
Room 14 South wall Middle Zone border with vegetal garland

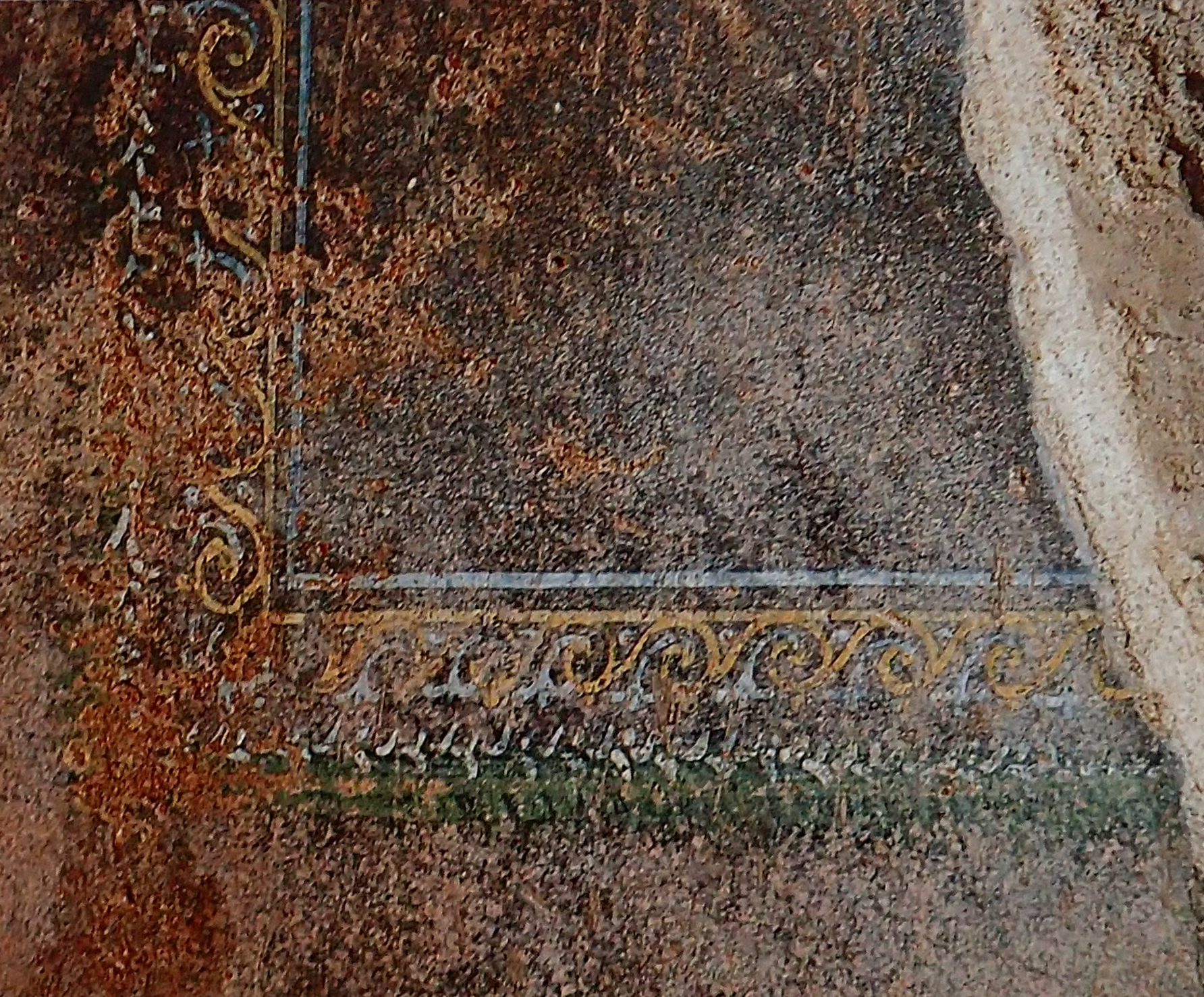
Room 14 West wall Middle Zone left

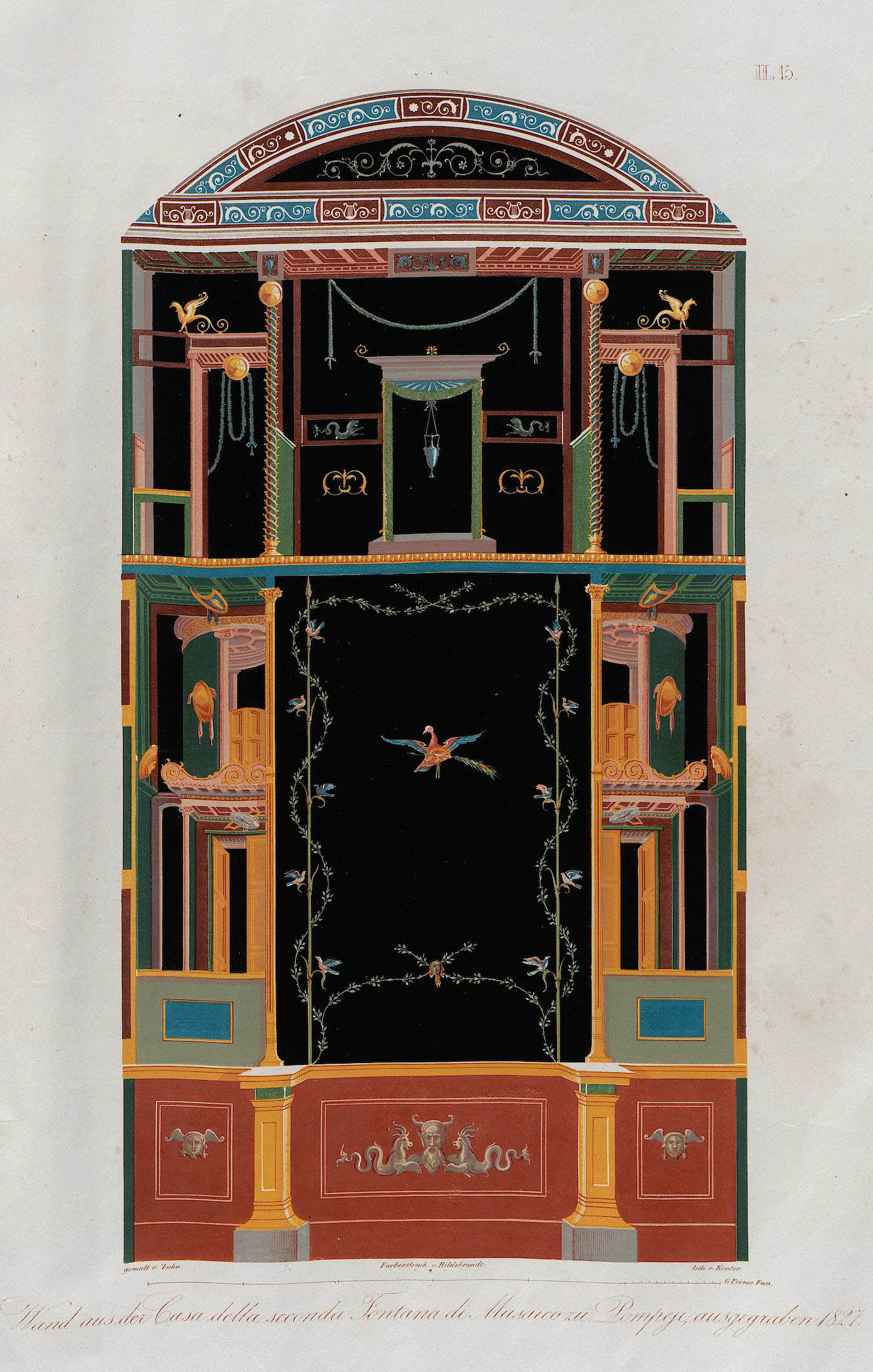
Room 15 East Wall by Wilhelm Zahn

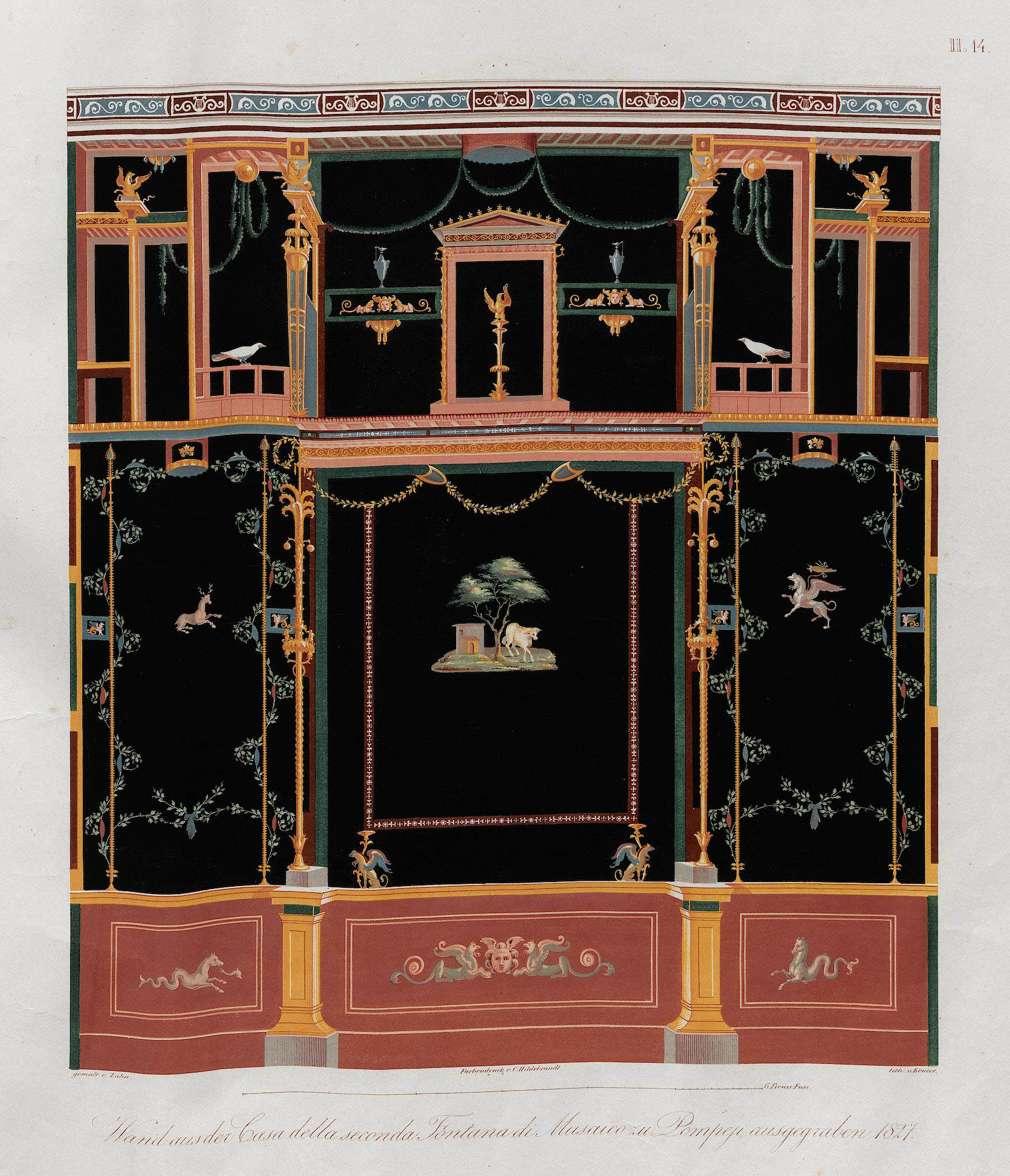
Room 15 North Wall by Wilhelm Zahn

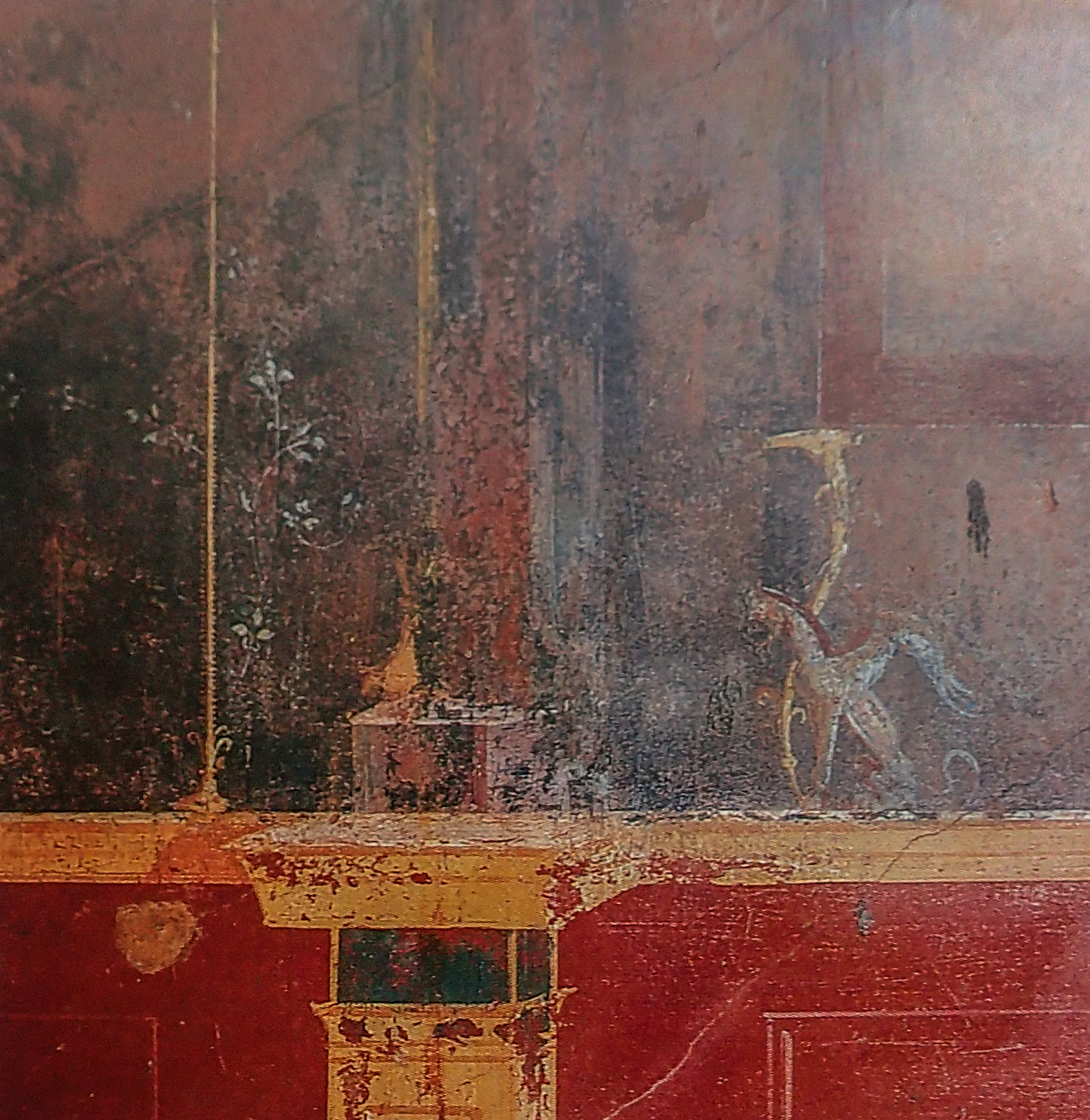
Room 15 North Wall Middle Zone Left

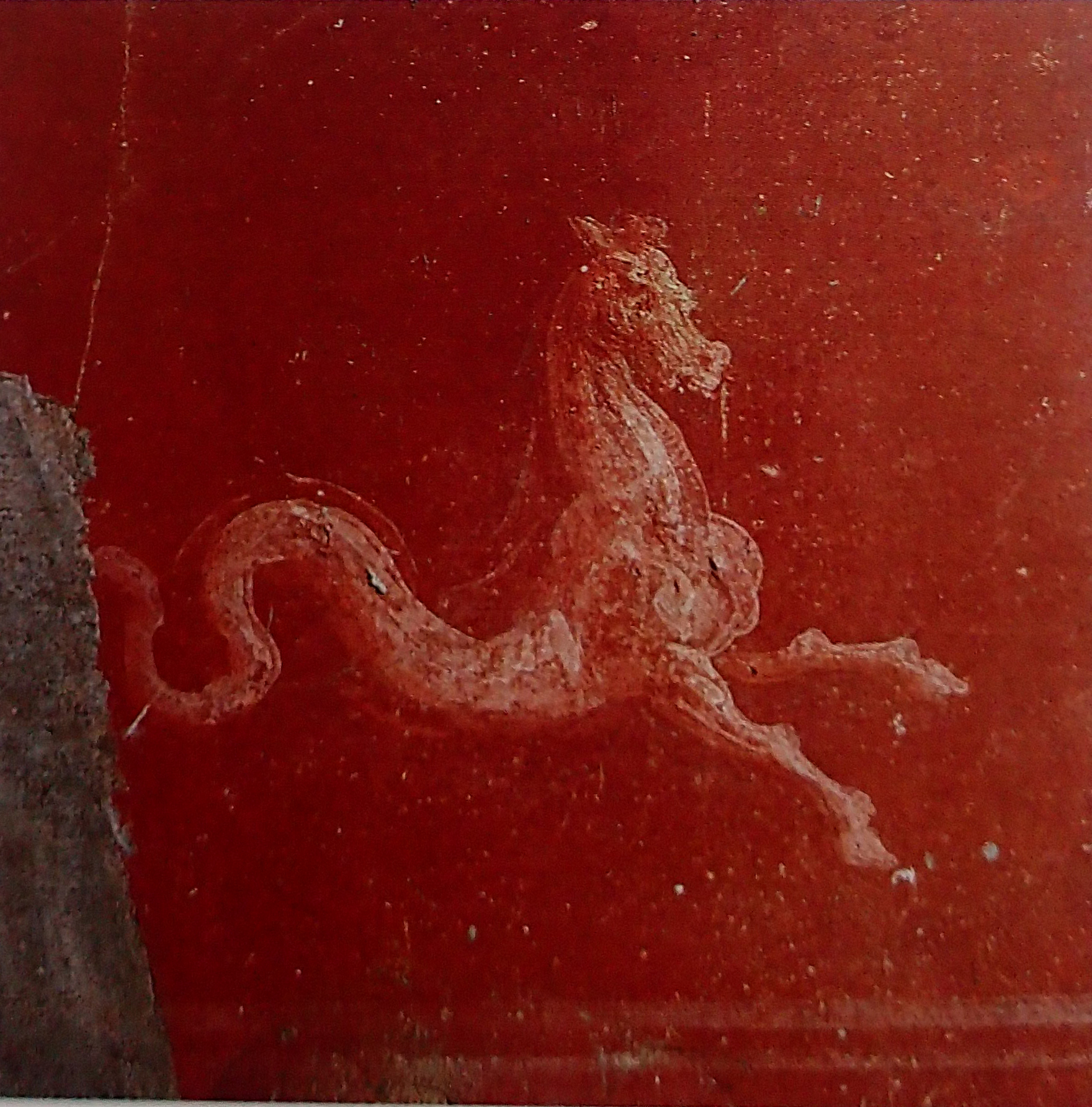
Room 15 North Wall Details Hippocamp

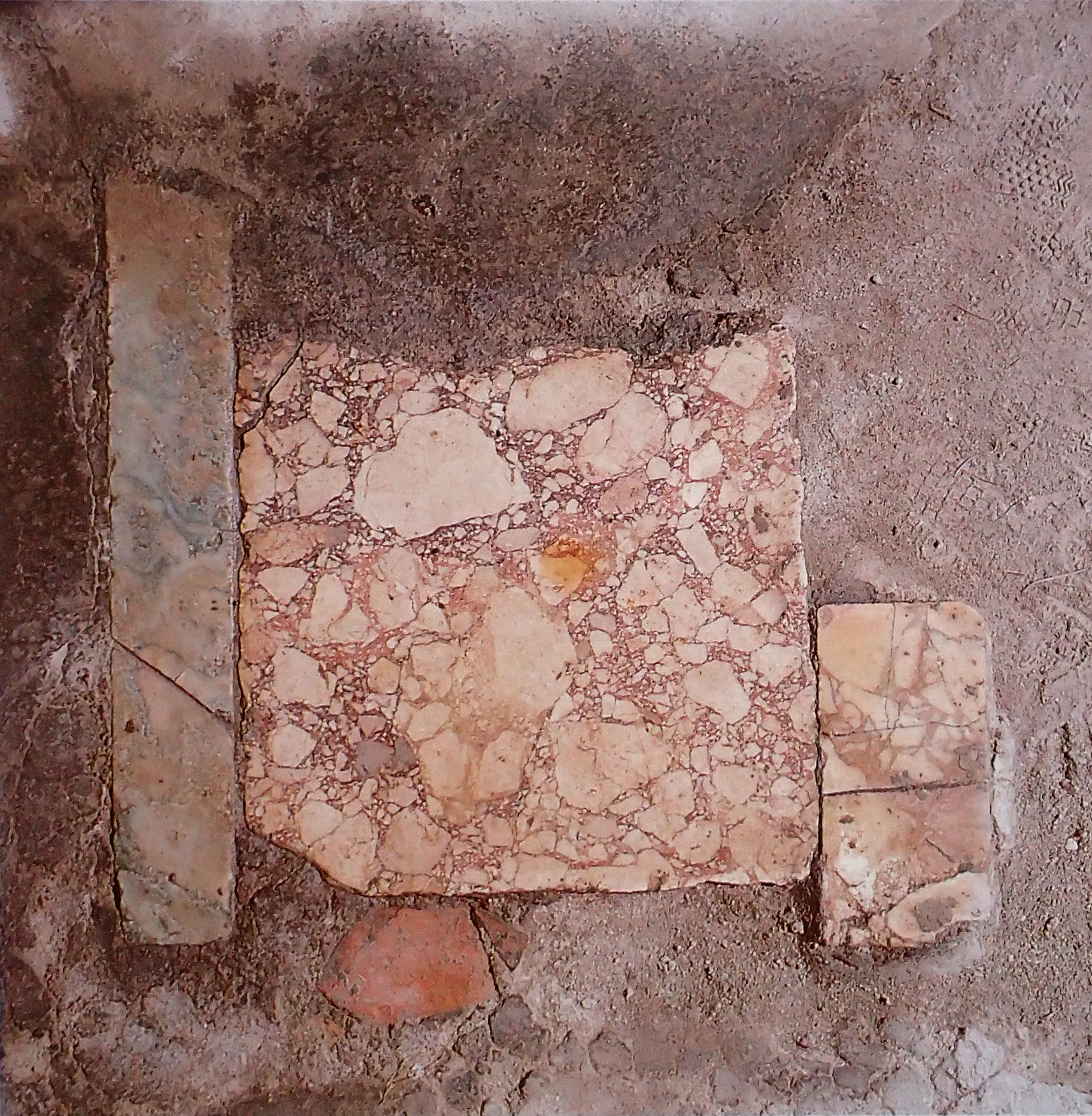
Room 18 opus sectile mosaic

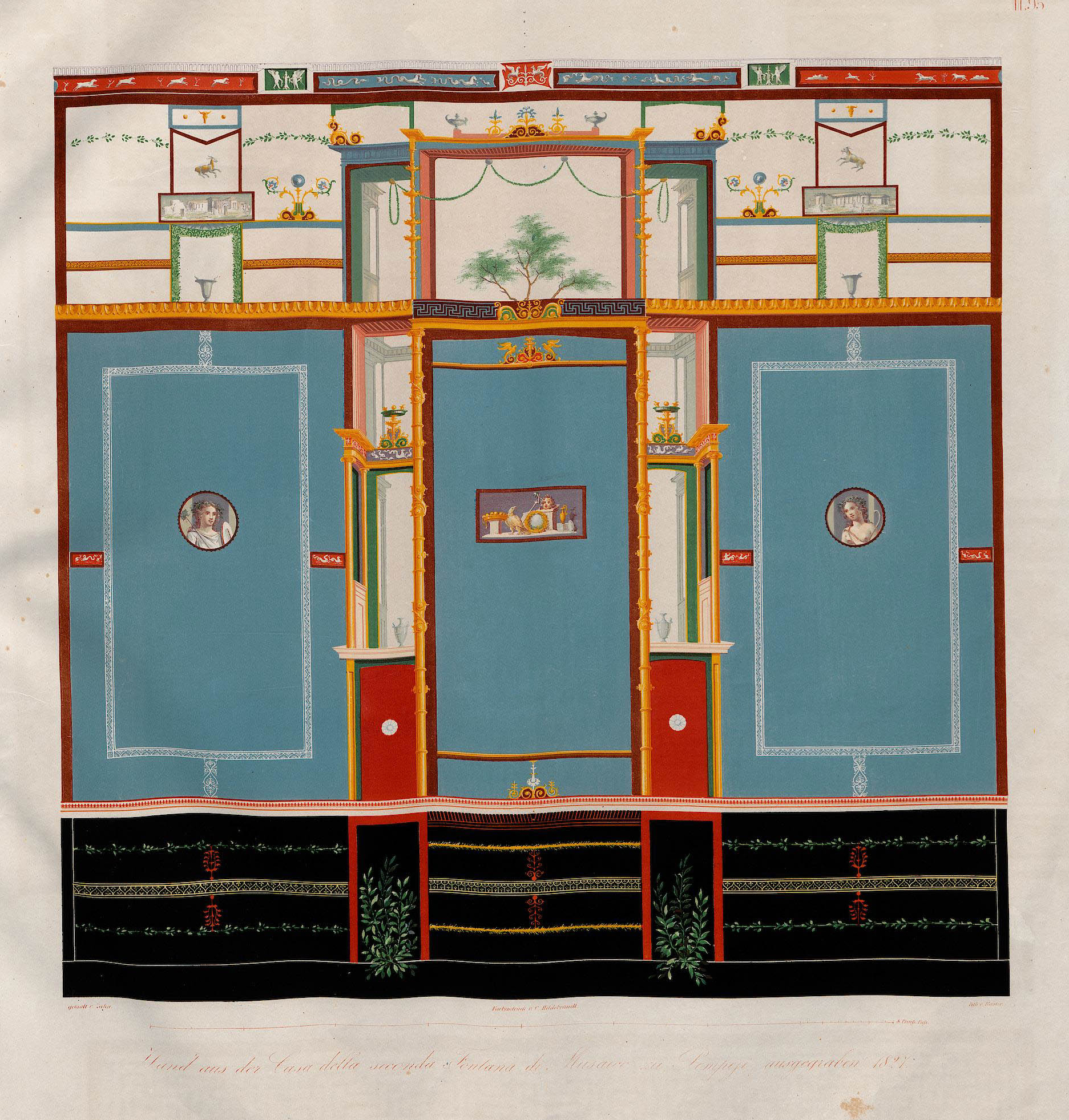
Room 19 West Wall by Wilhelm Zahn

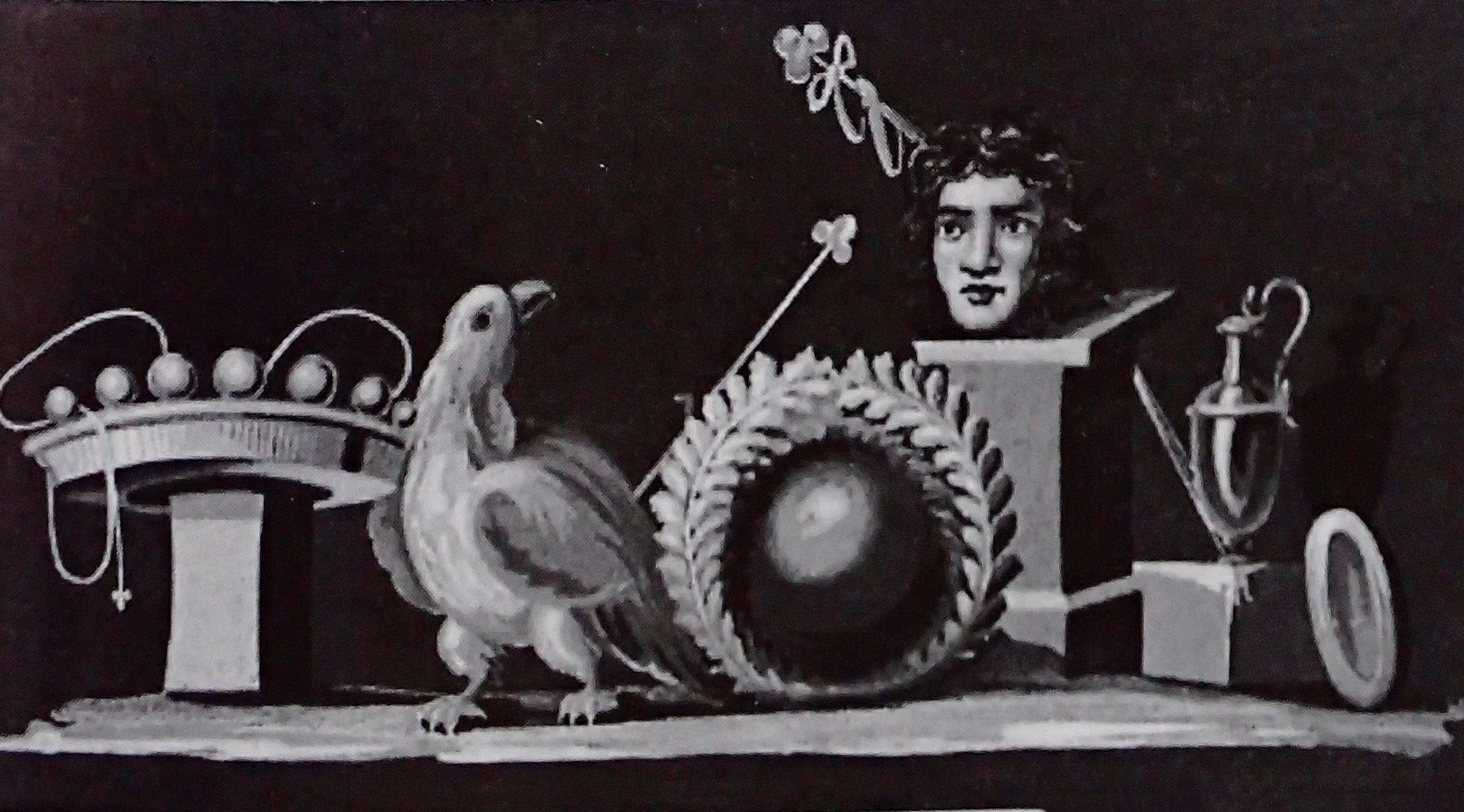
Tablinum 19 Nineteenth century watercolor of west wall center panel painting by Niccolini

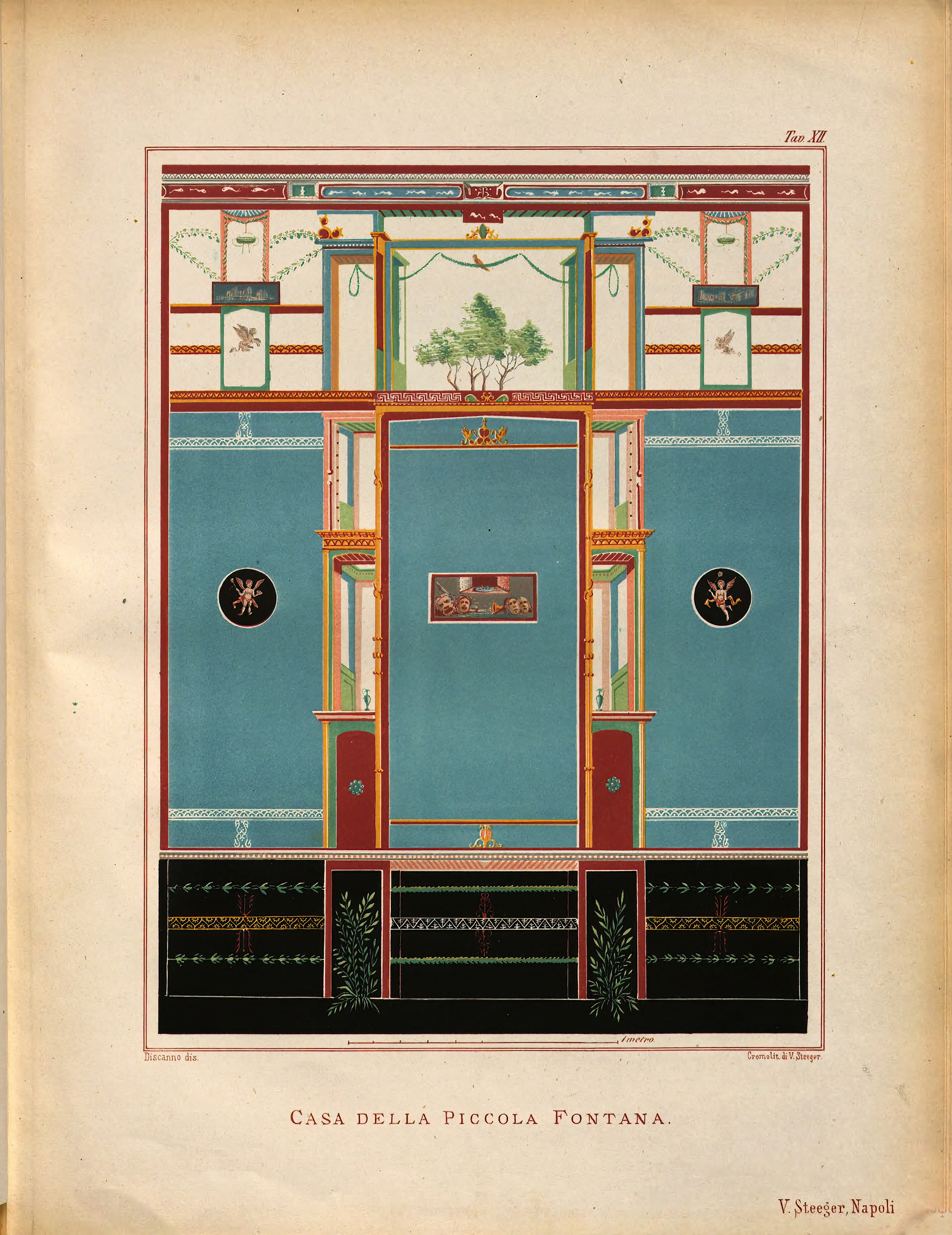
Tablinum (Room 19 ) North Wall by Geremia Discanno, 1877

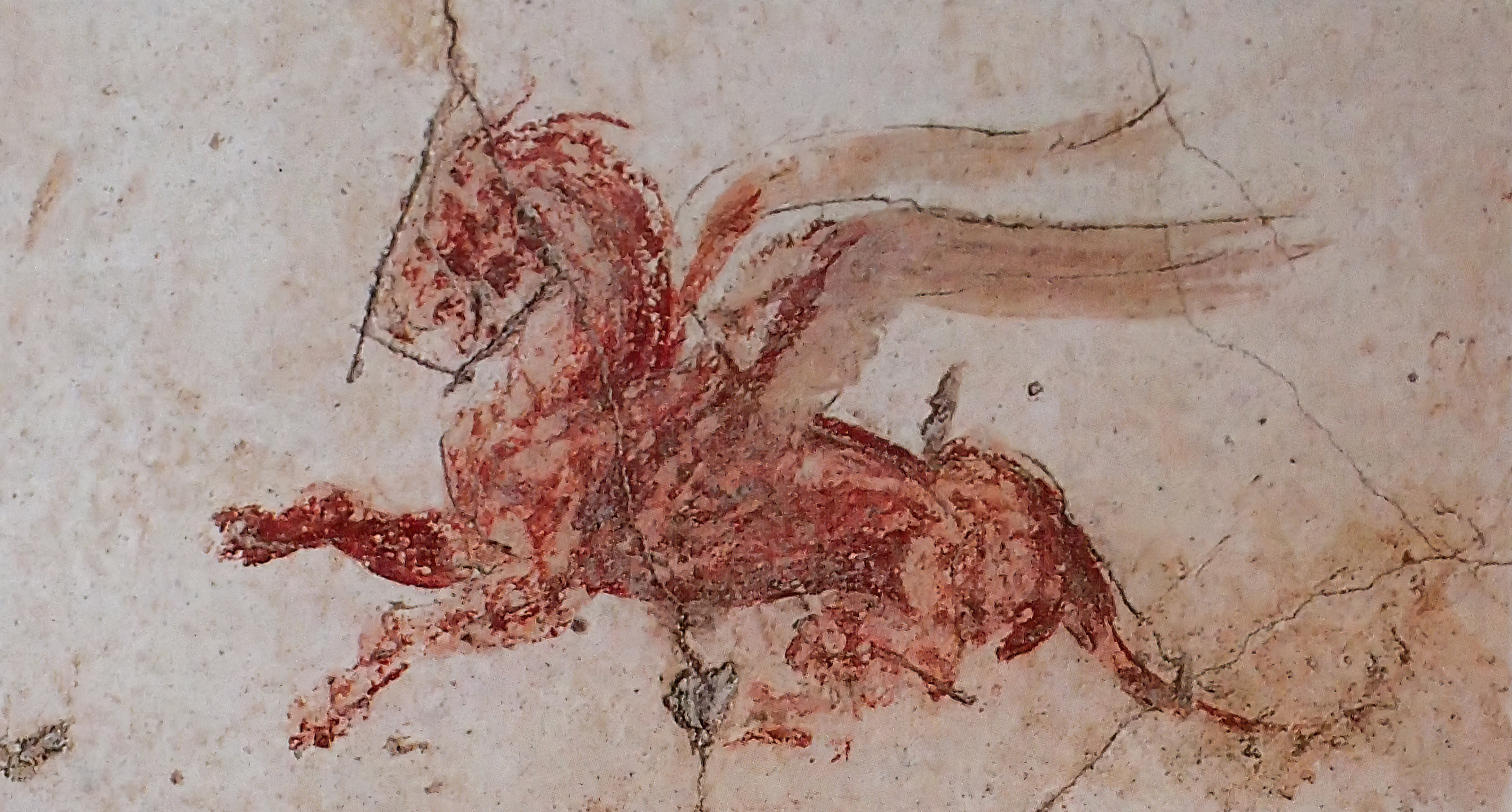
Room 24 North Wall Middle Zone Right Griffin

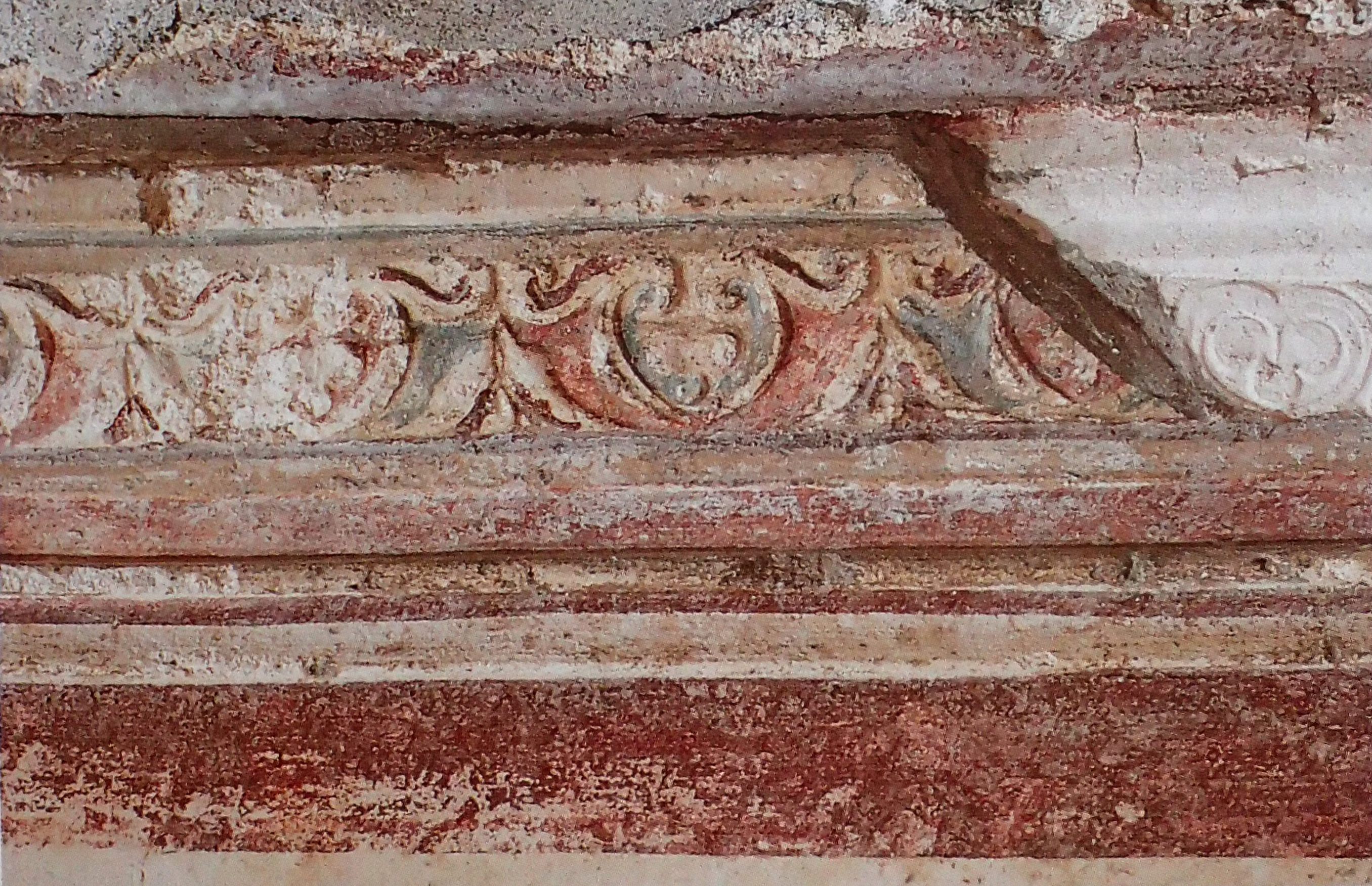
Room 24 North Wall Stucco Molding

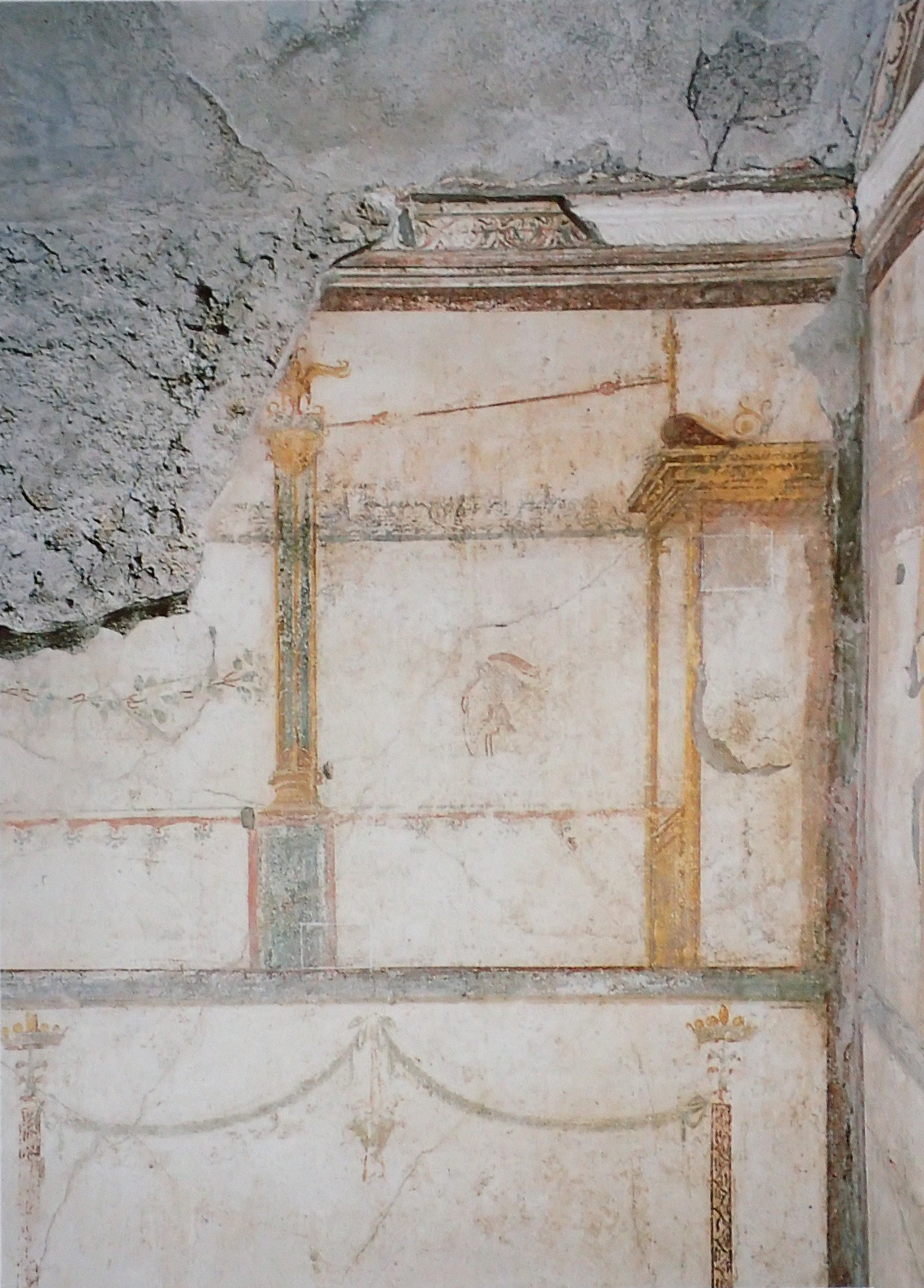
Room 24 North Wall Upper Zone Right

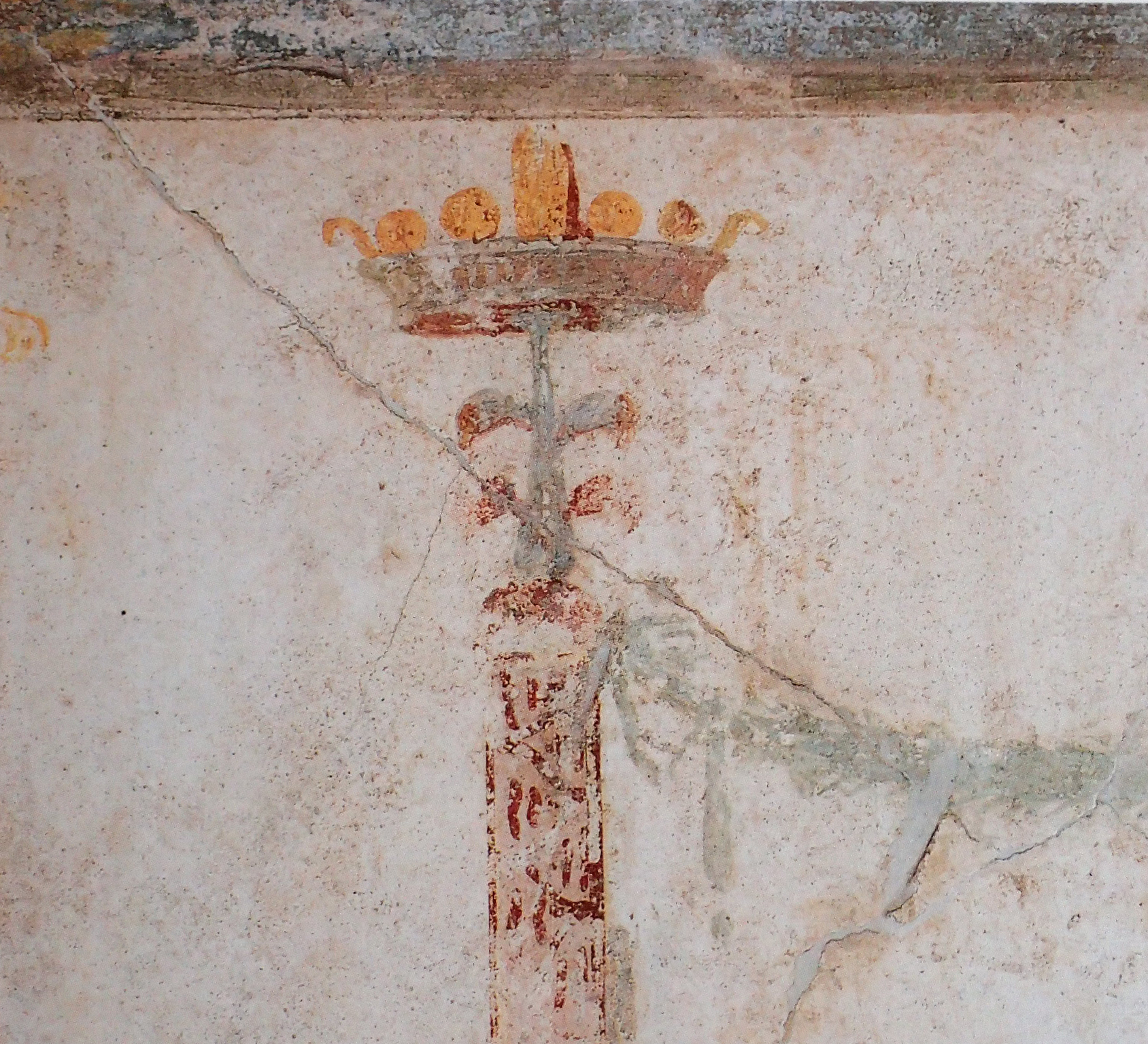
Room 24 North Wall Middle Zone Right candelabra

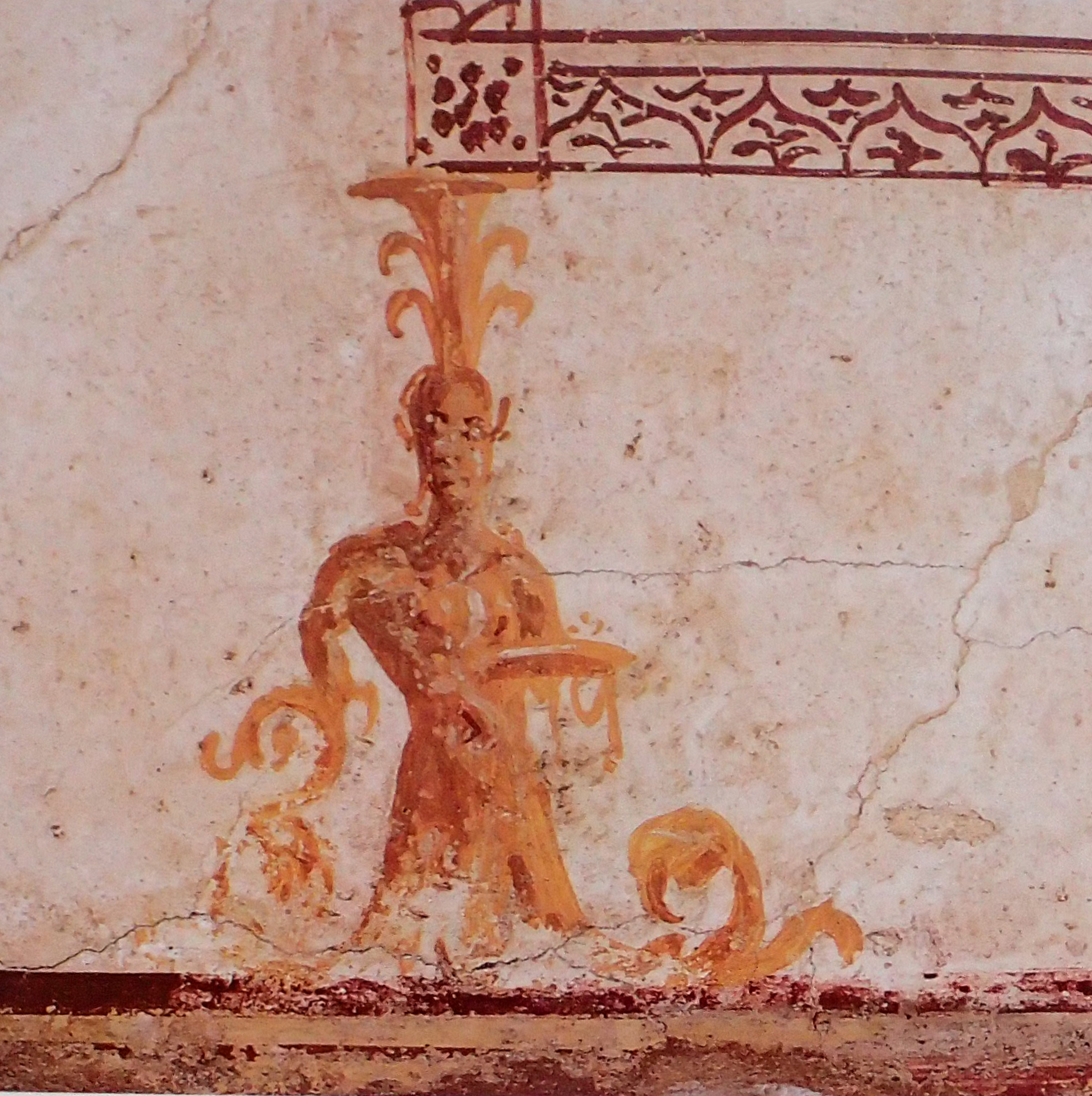
Room 24 West Wall Middle Zone Left Humanoid with vegetal appendages

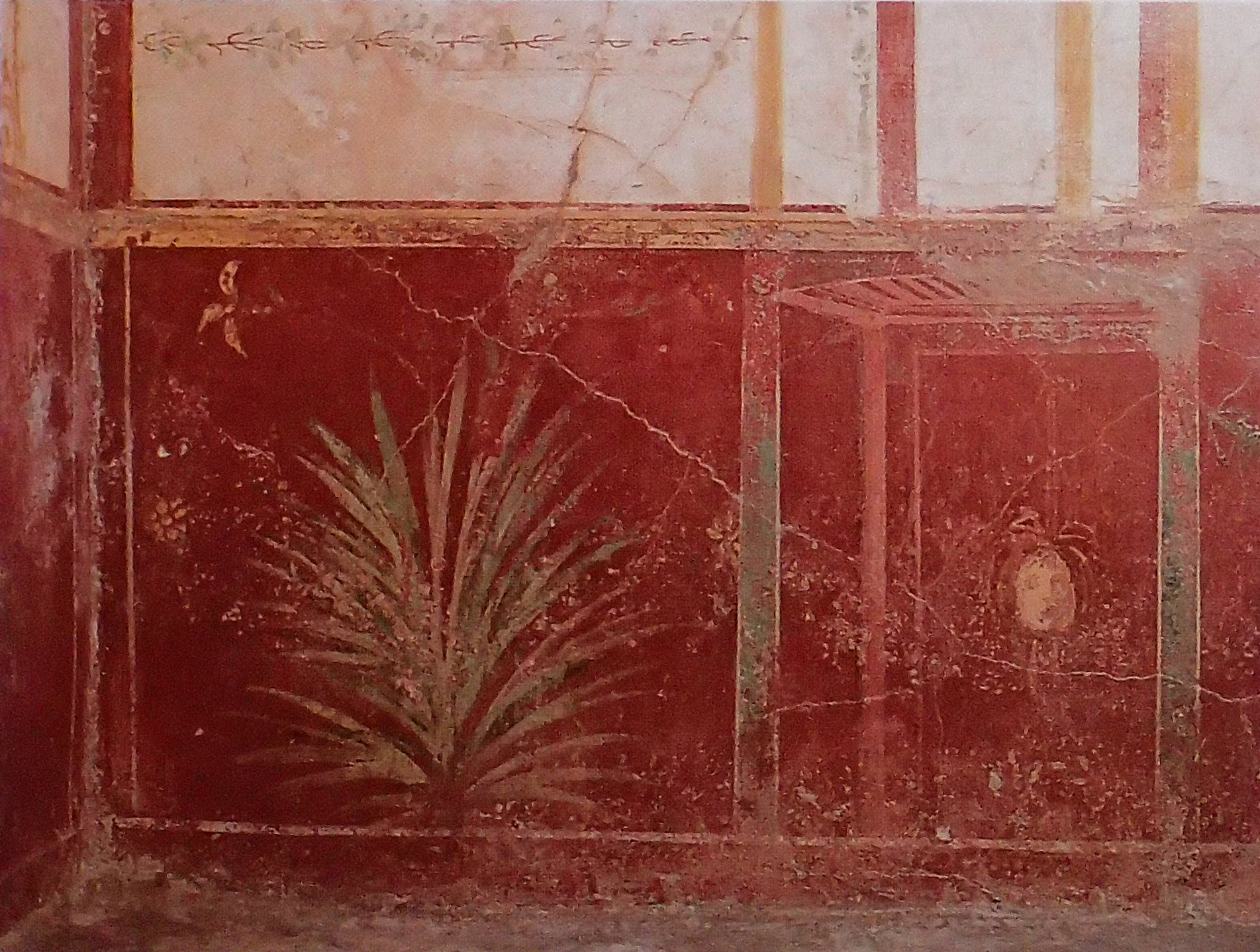
Room 24 West Wall Socle Left Bird, plant and theater mask

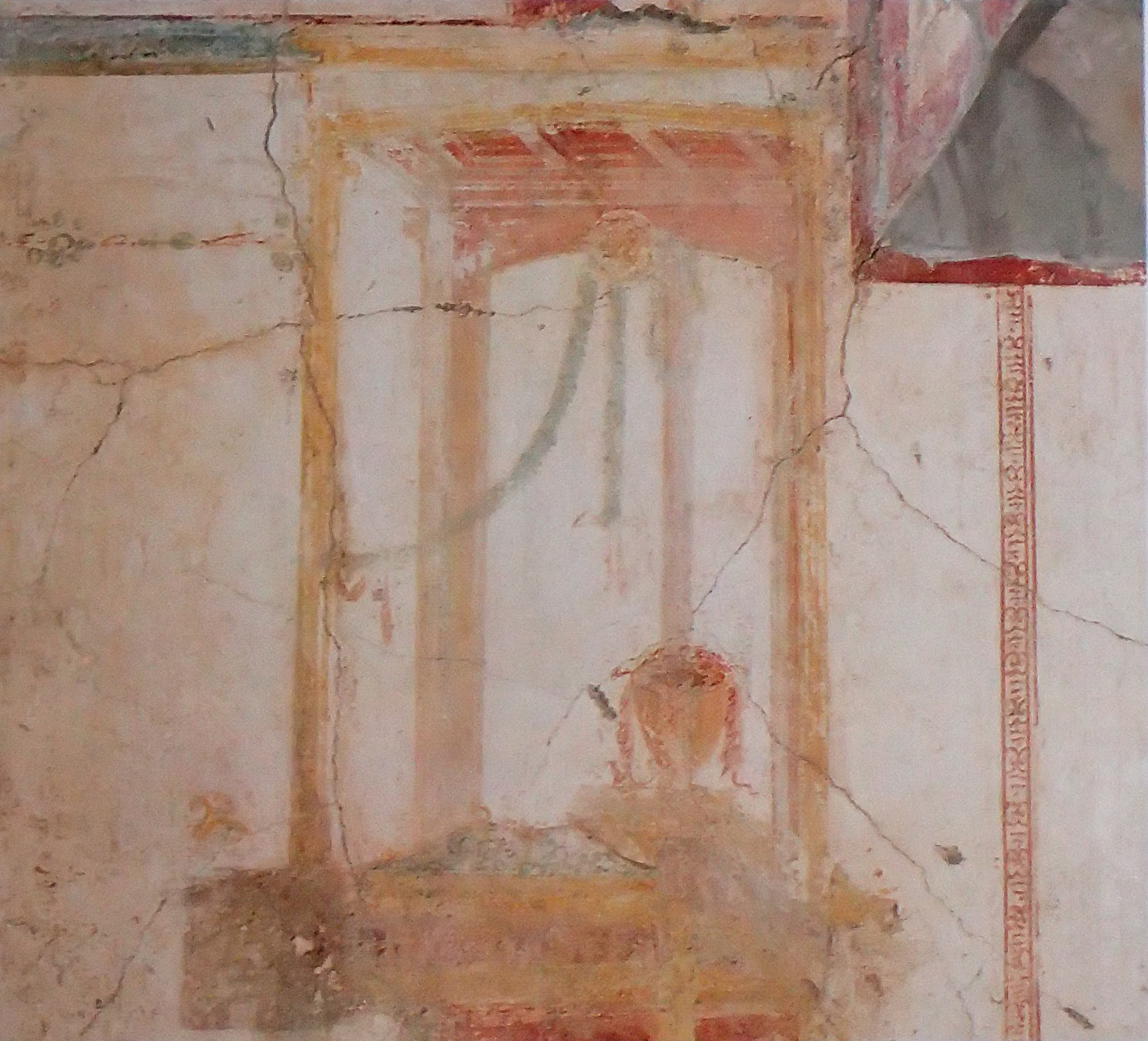
Room 24 East Wall Middle Zone Left Aedicula with offerings

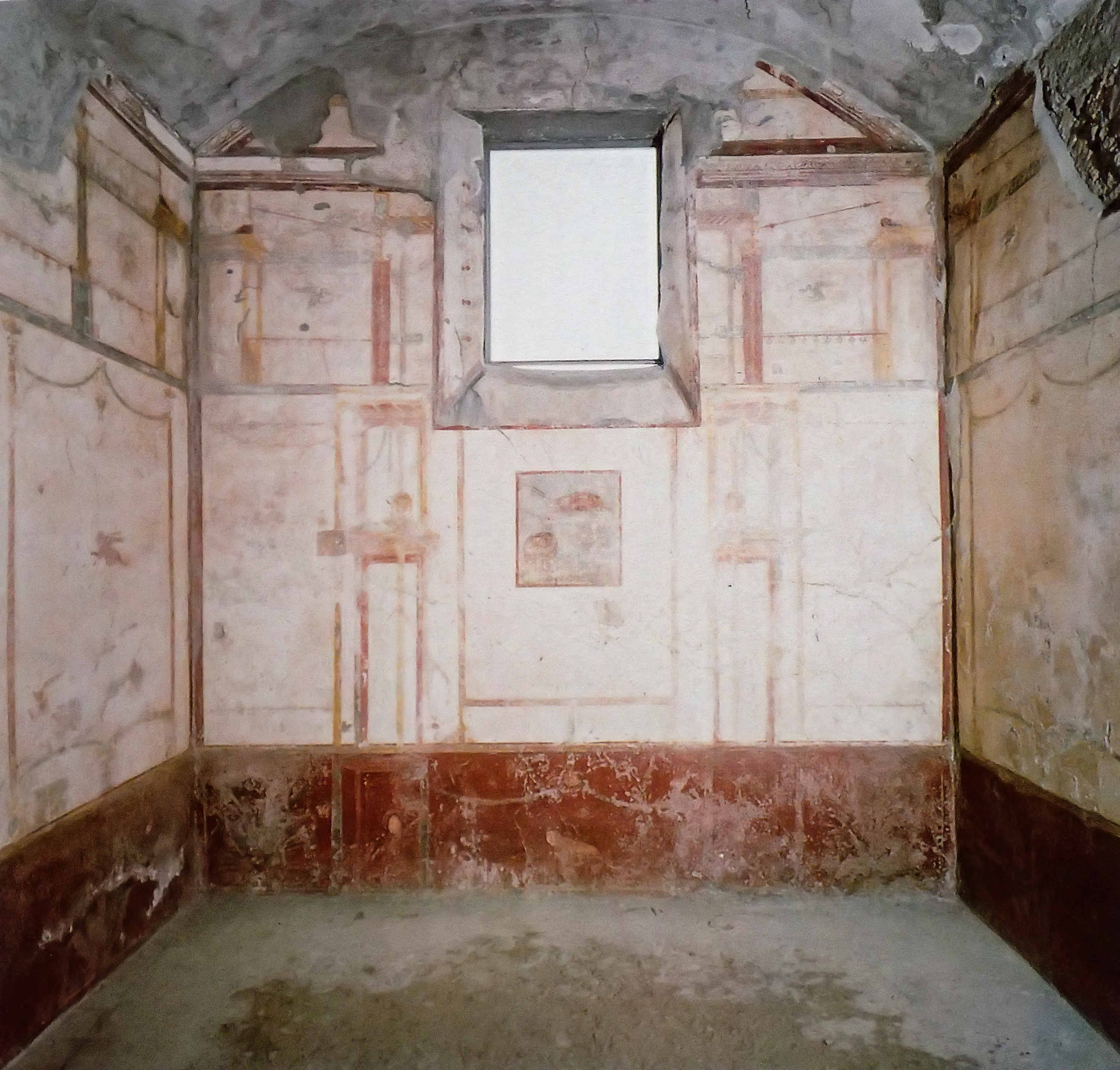
Room 24 East wall

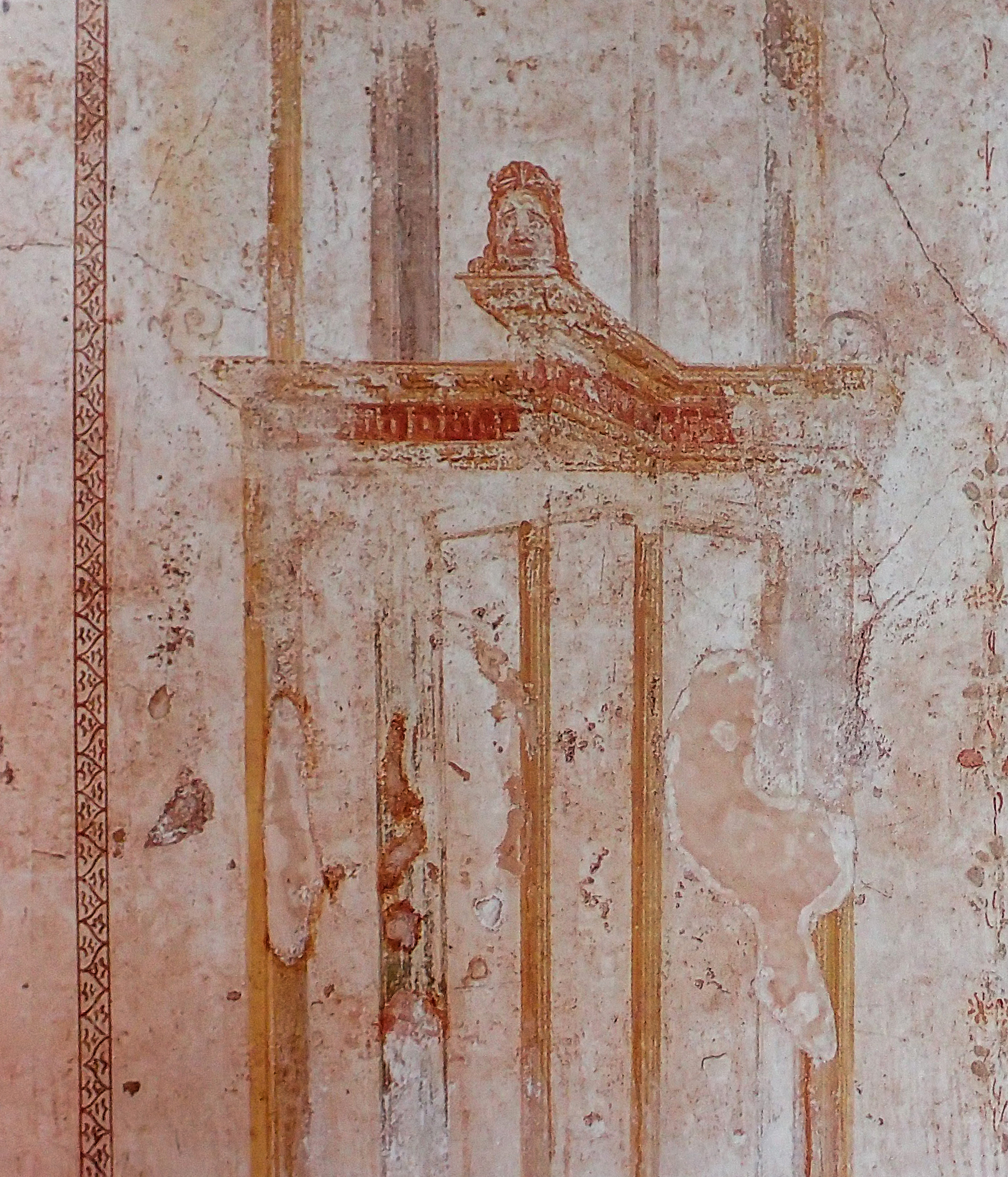
Room 24 South Wall Middle Zone Left Aedicula with tragic mask

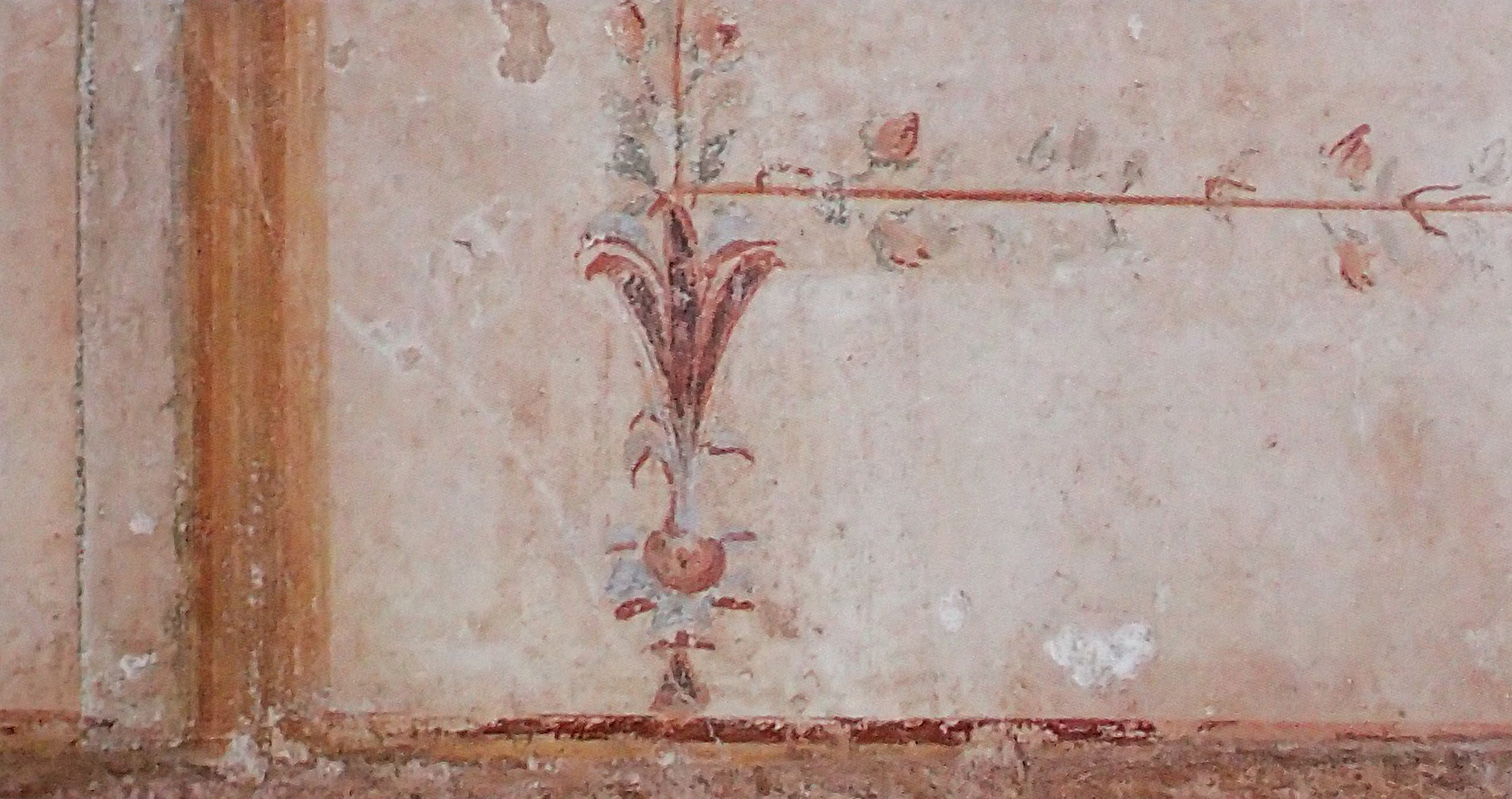
Room 24 South Wall Middle Zone Left Corner Floral Ornament

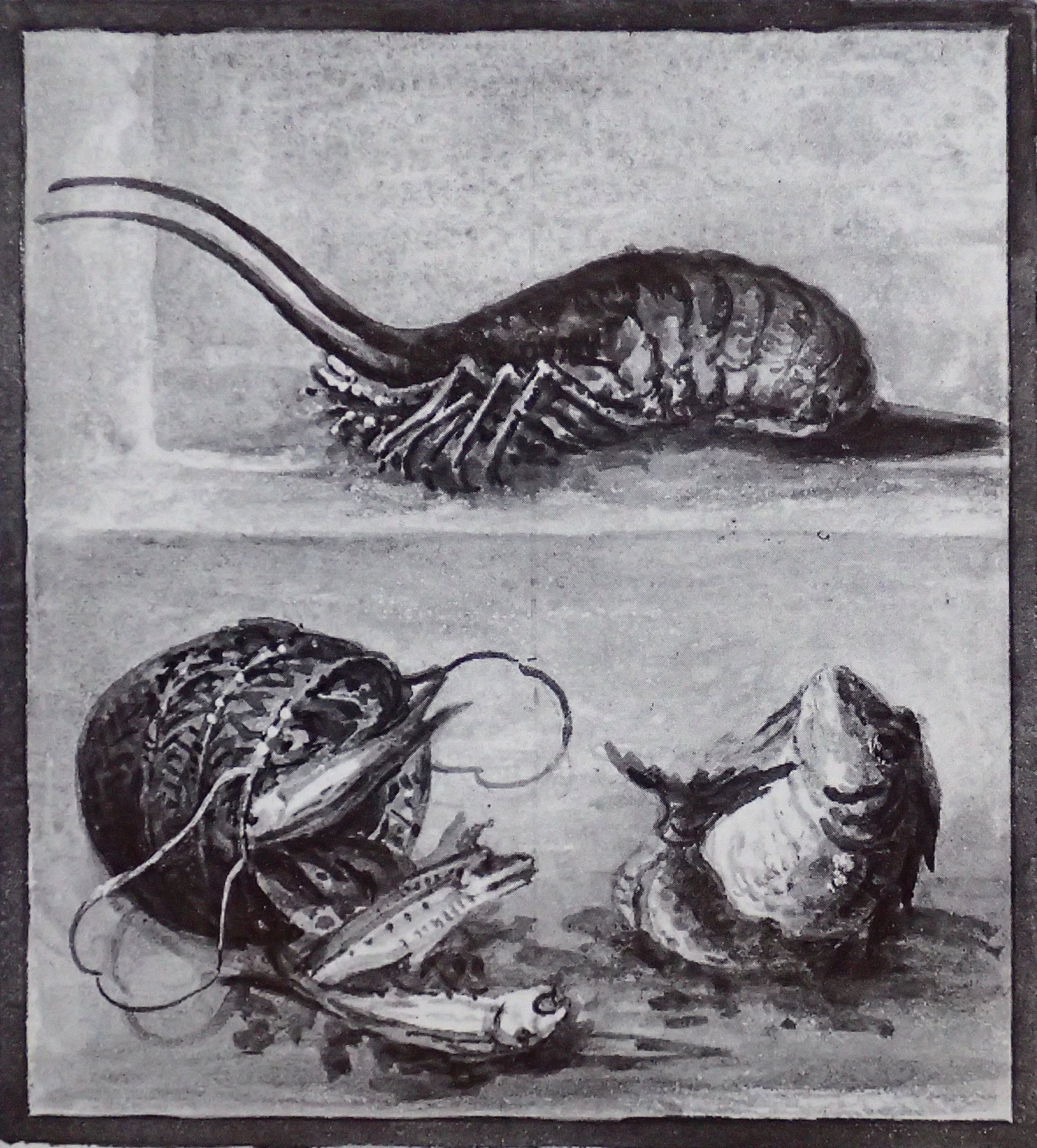
19th century Watercolor of Room 24 East Wall Middle Zone Lobster and Fishes

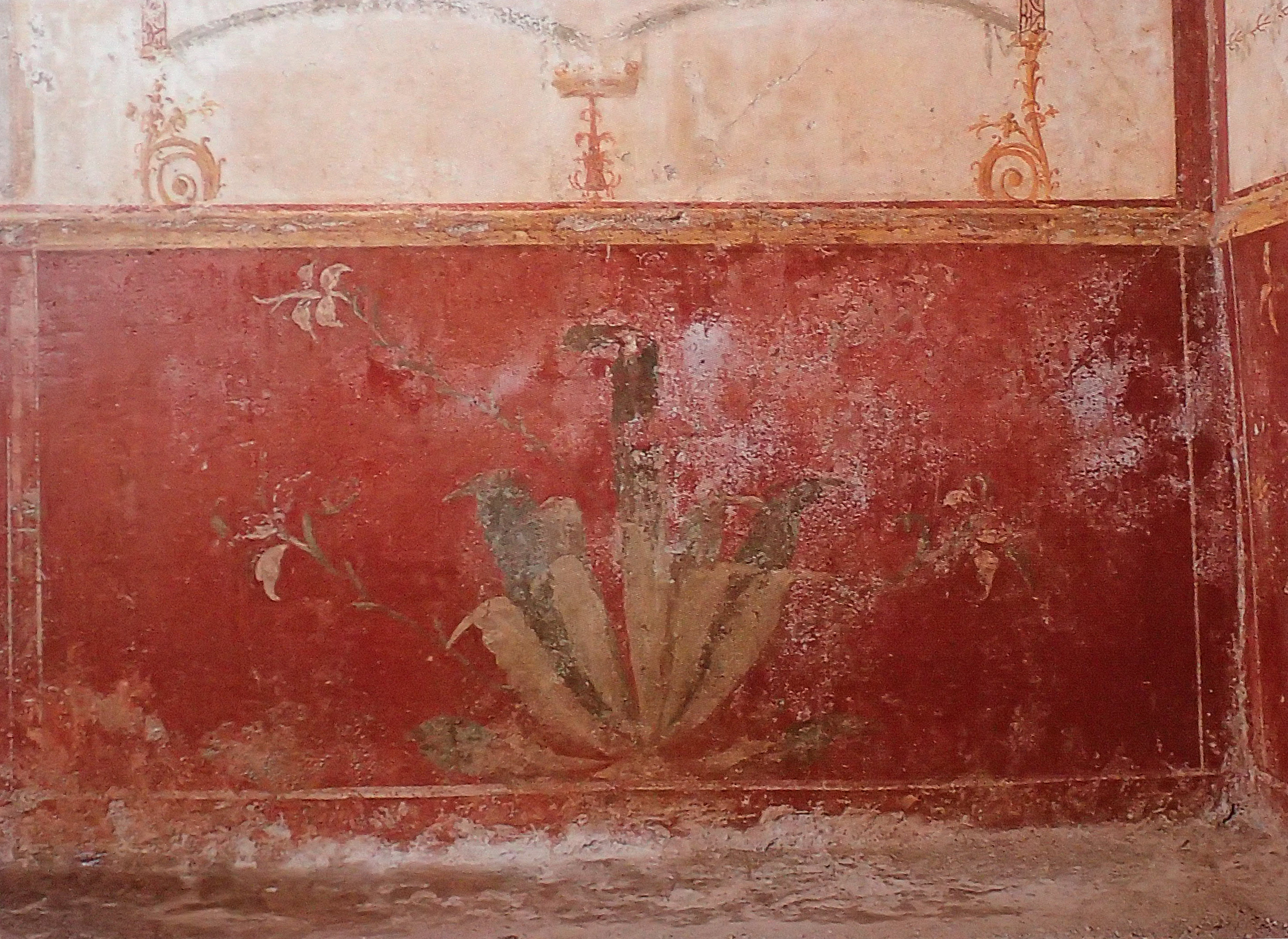
Room 24 South Wall Socle Right plant

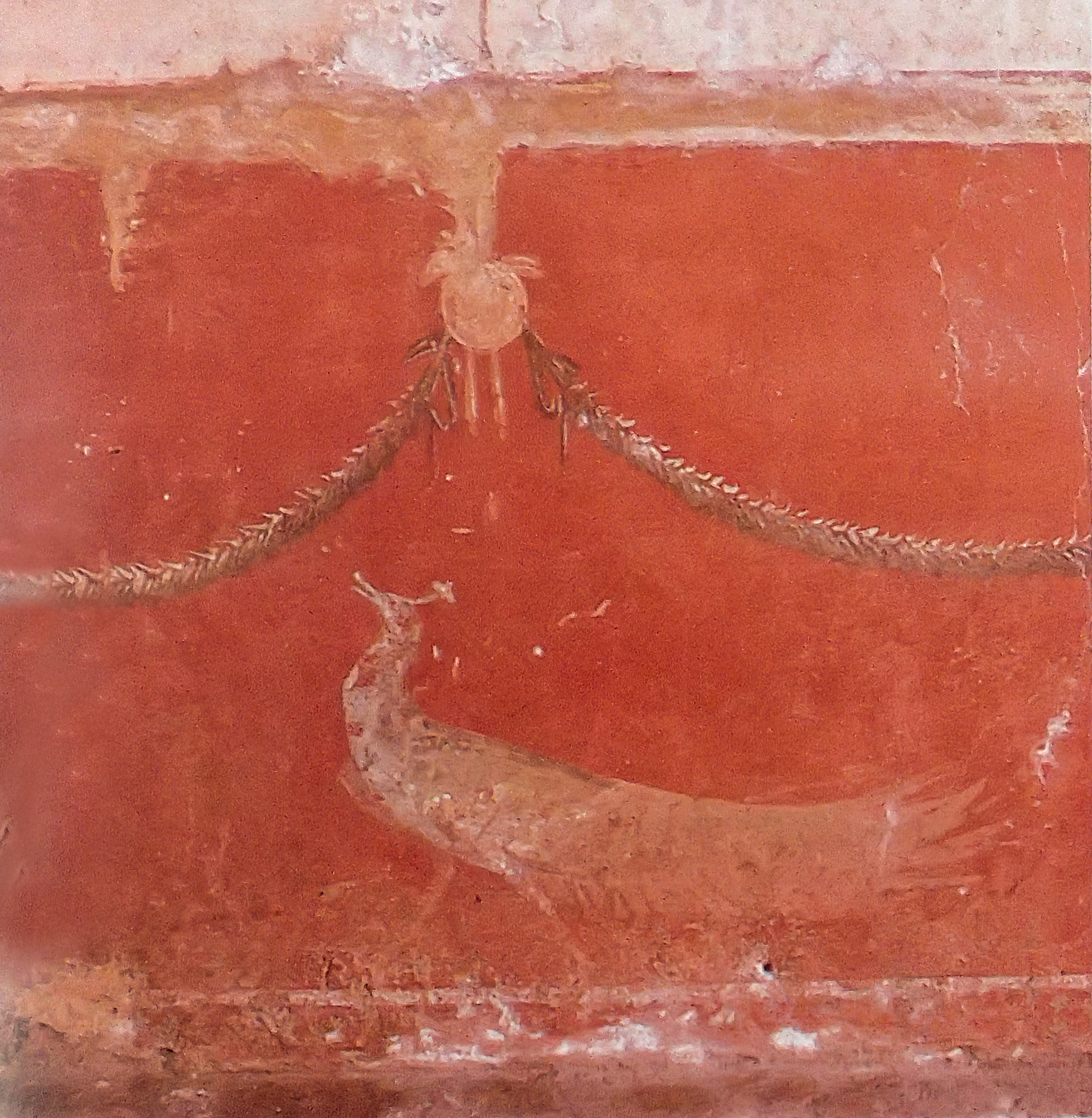
Room 24 South Wall Socle Center Peacock

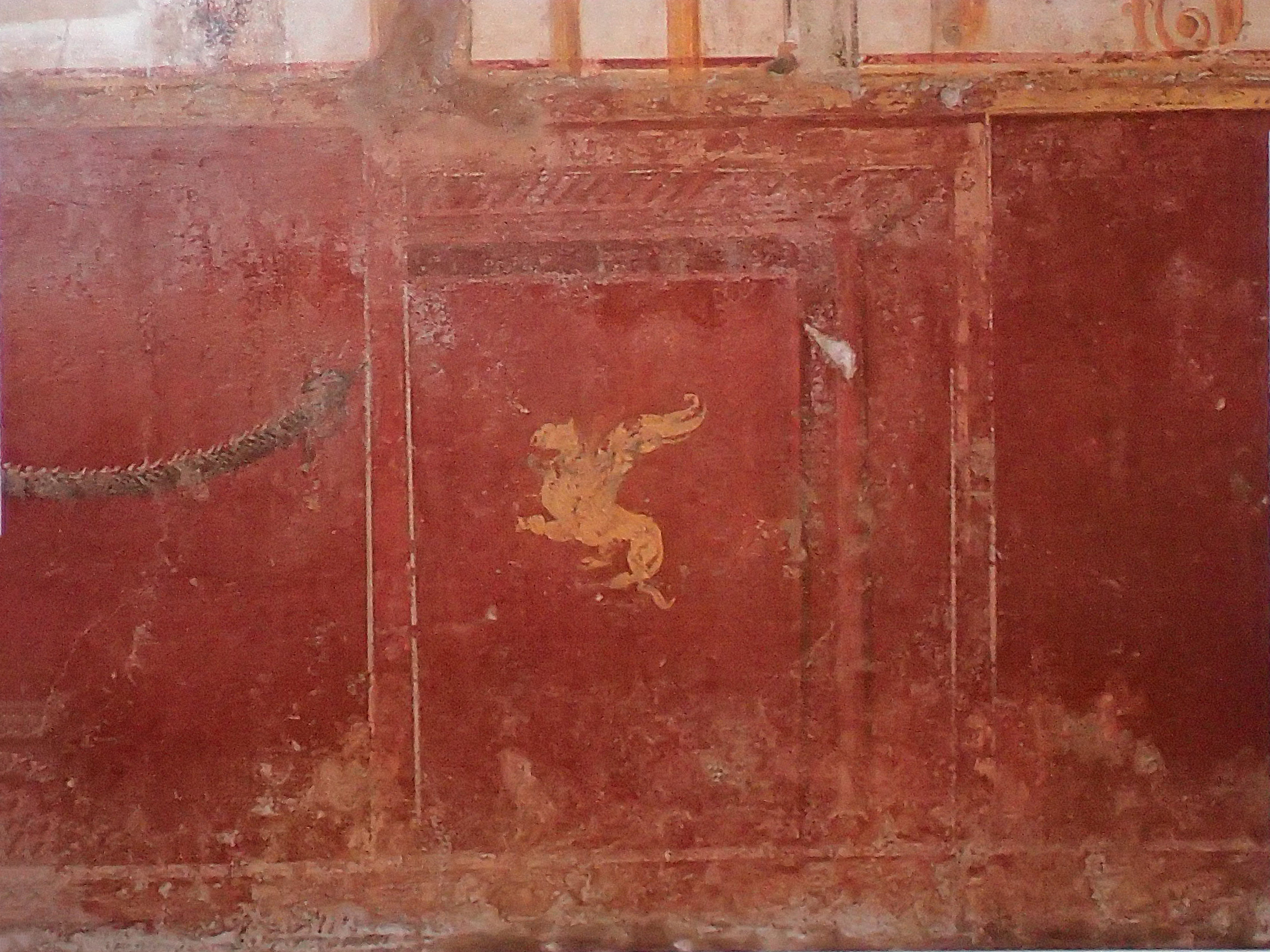
Room 24 South Wall Socle Right Griffin

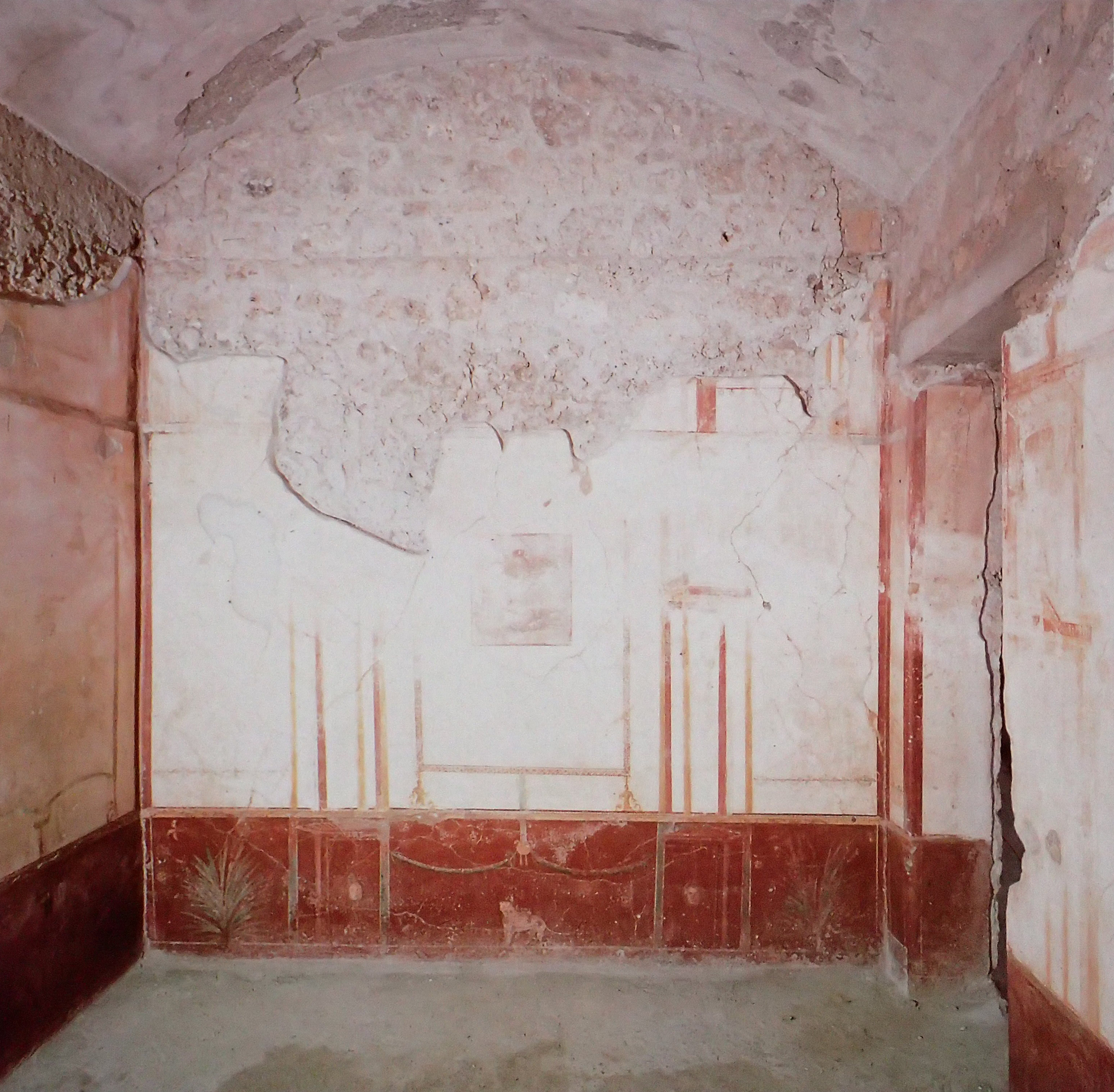
Room 24 West Wall

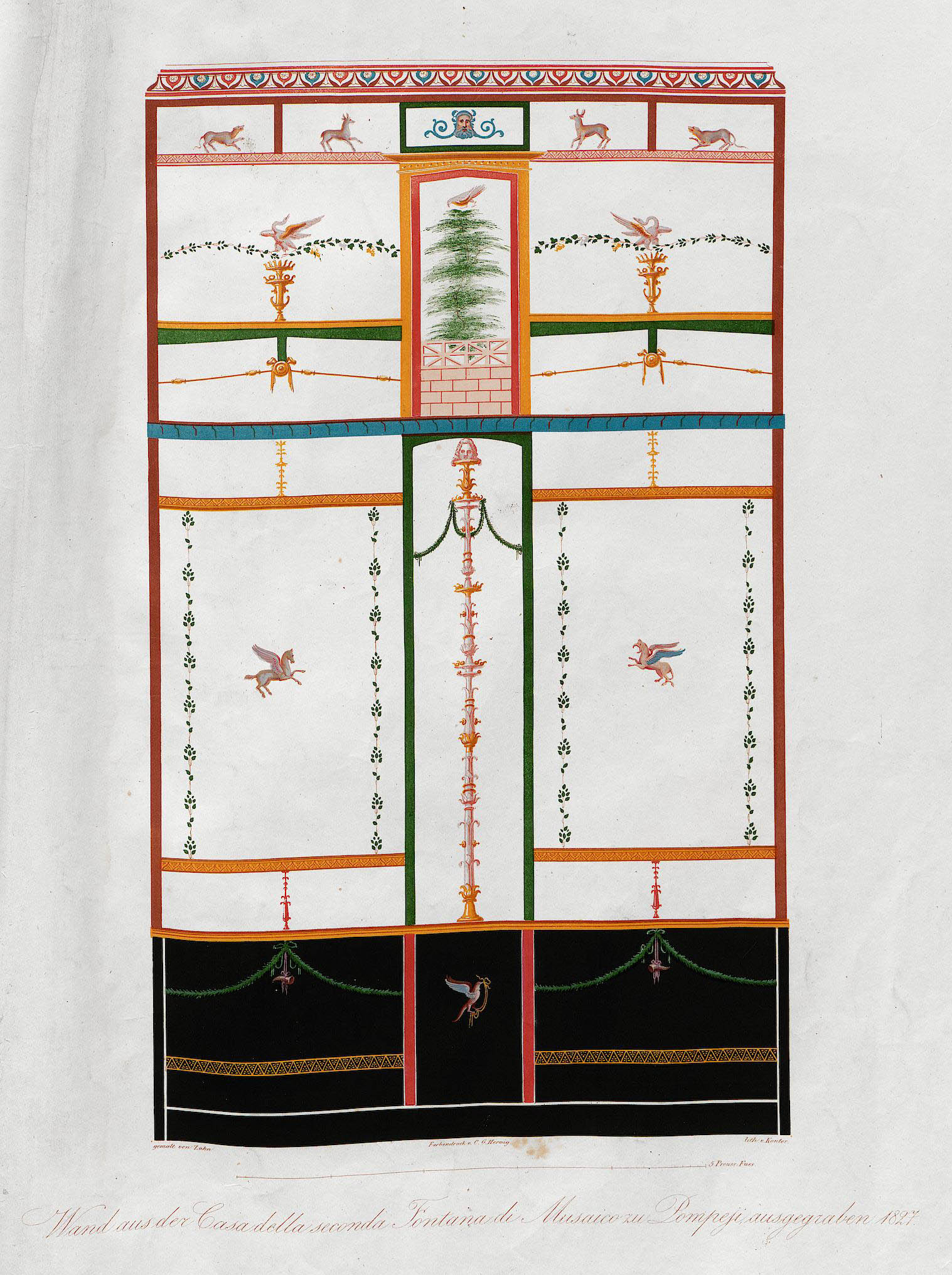
North or South Wall Room 25 by Wilhelm Zahn

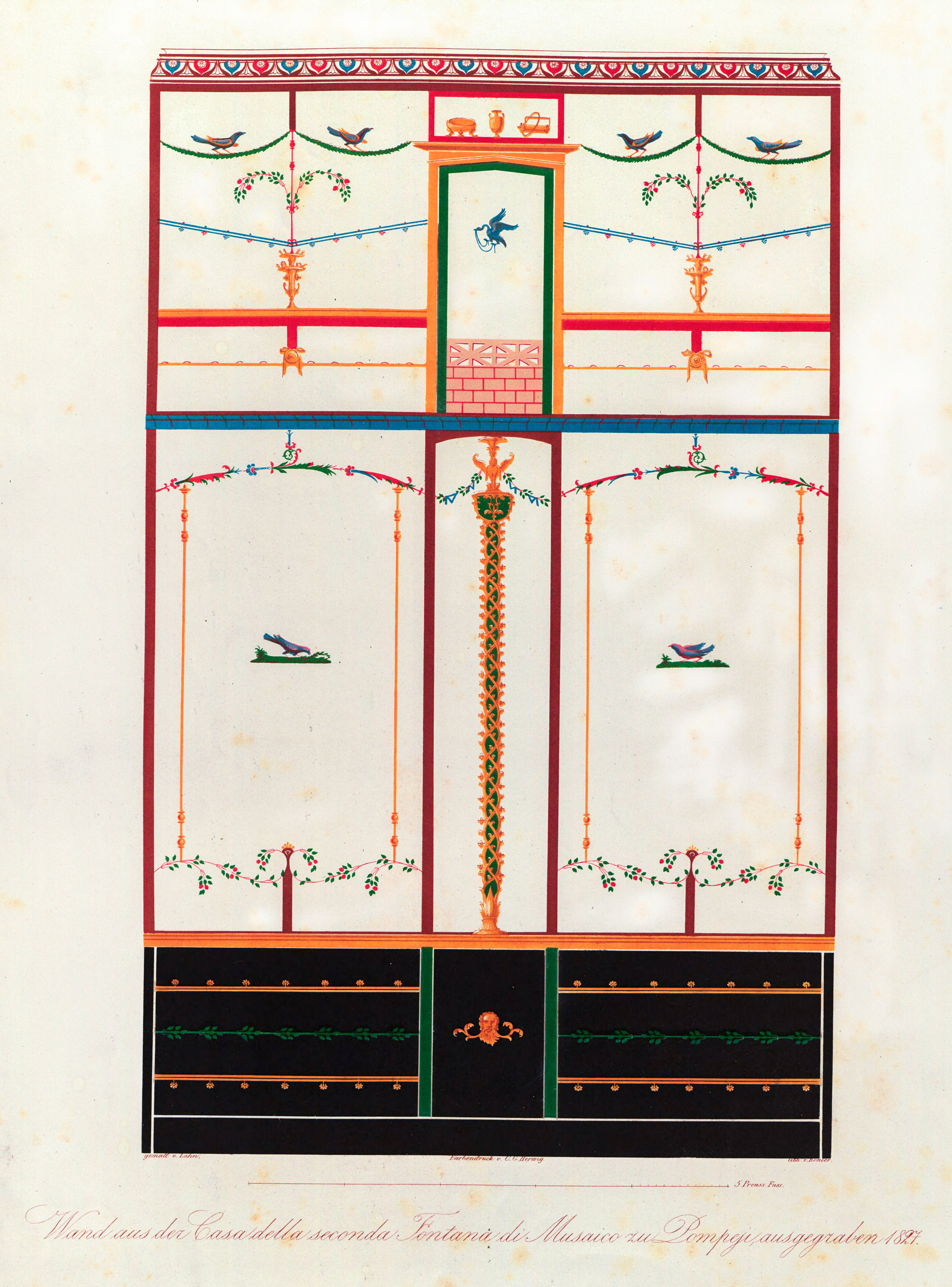
Room 25 East Wall by Wilhelm Zahn 1828

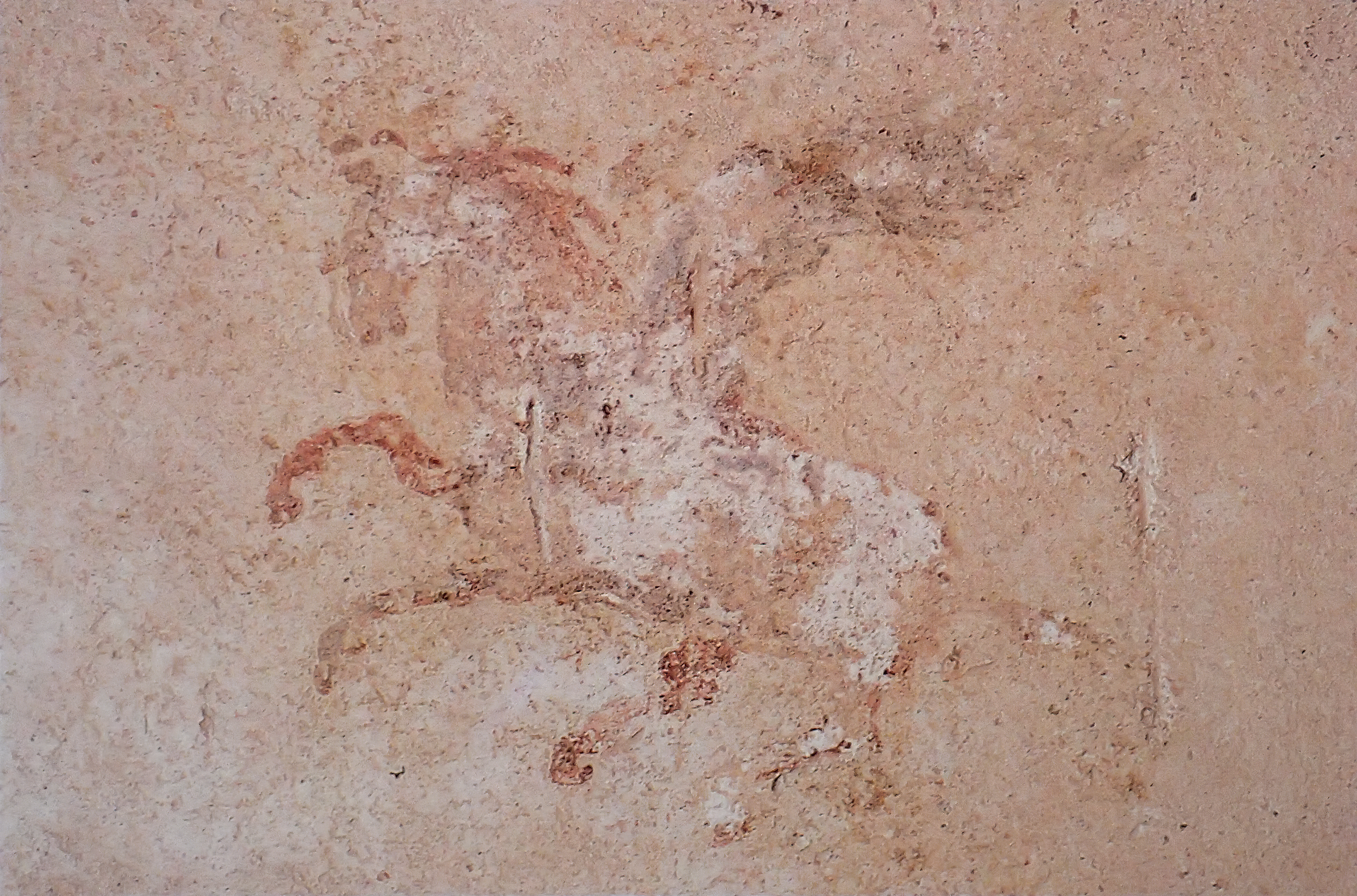
Room 25 Pegasus North Wall Middle Zone Right

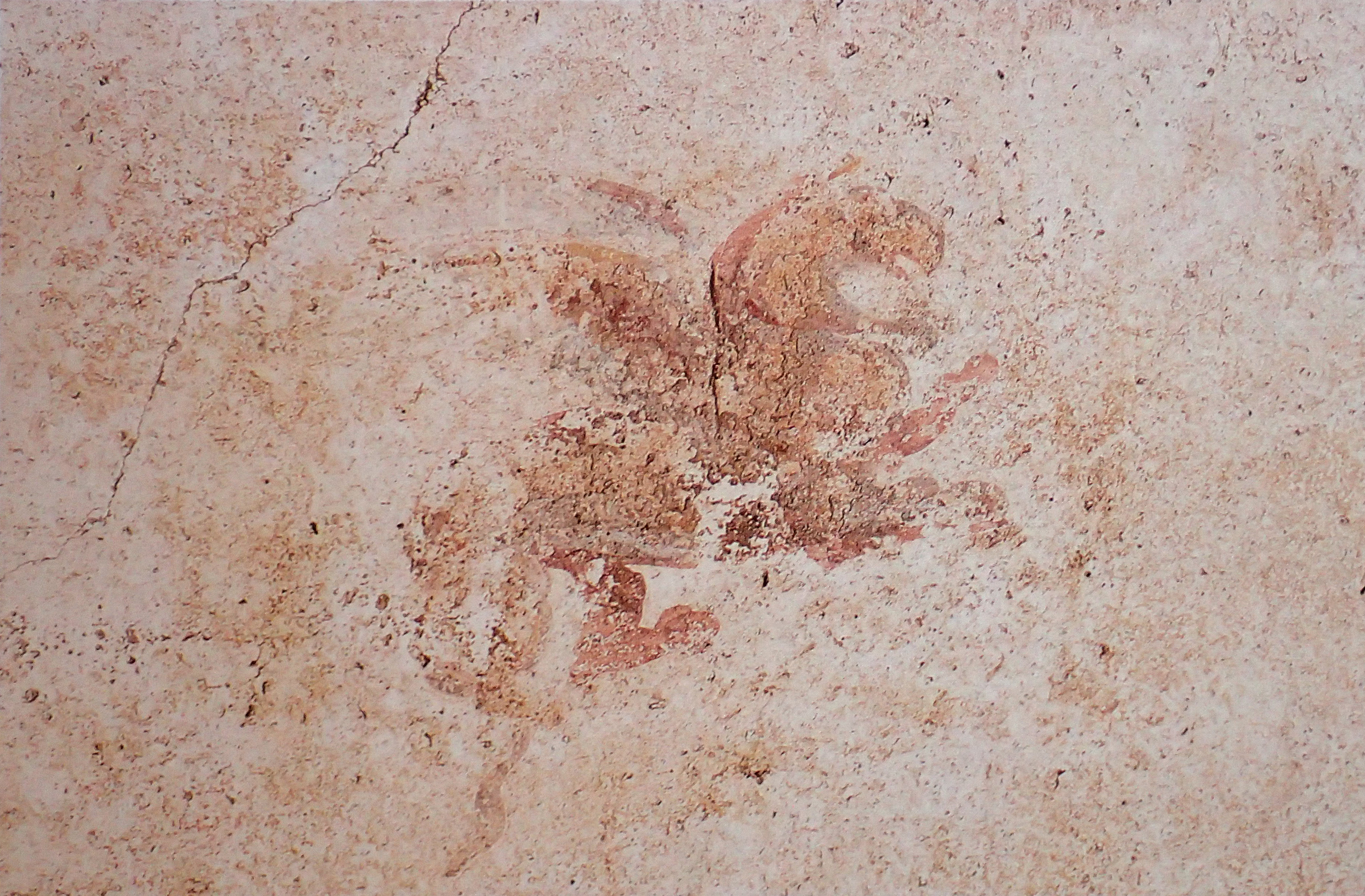
Room 25 Griffin North Wall Middle Zone Left

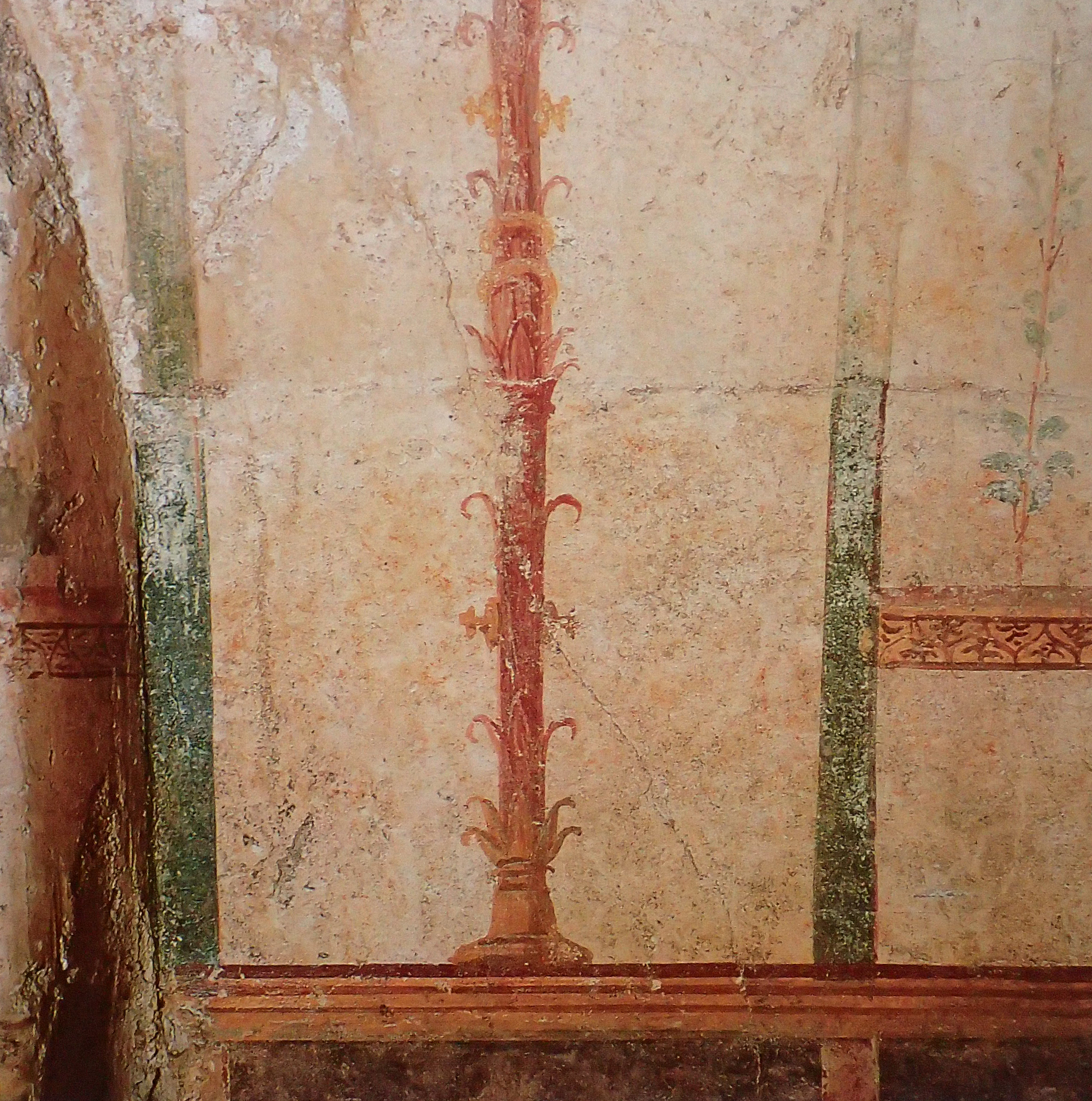
Room 25 North Wall Middle Zone Center

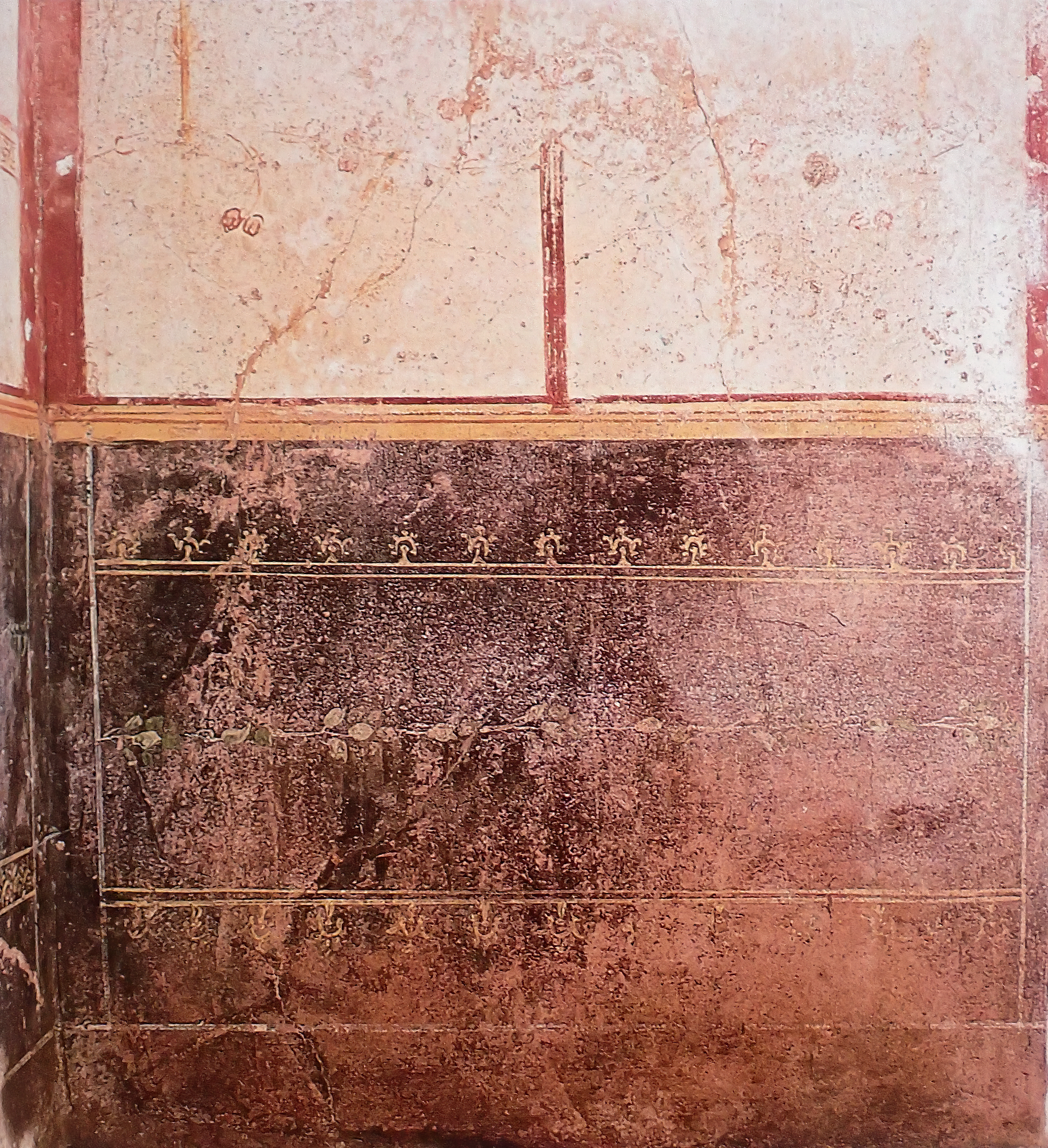
Room 25 Sockel West Wall Left circa 1996

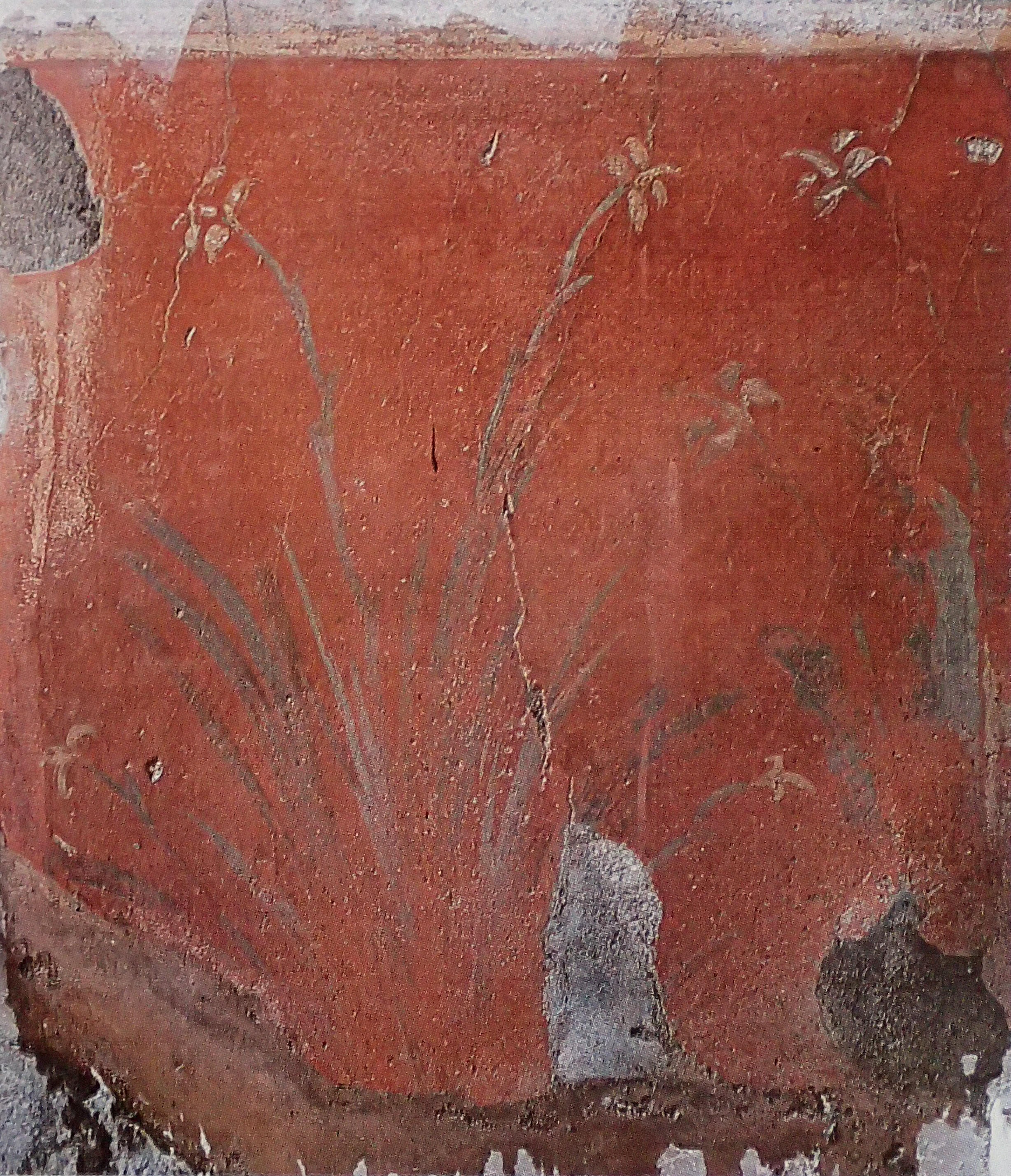
Room 26-27 Socle Lefet plants with flowers circa 1996

Room 28 – Stairwell: Double-flight staircase with doorway on the south to fauces (1). The steps are constructed of opus incertum and treads are covered with roof tile fragments. The front surface of the steps is plastered. There are three successive windows beginning with the first about four 1/2 feet from the vestibule floor. The second window is positioned about five feet ten inches above the landing of the first ramp and the third window is about 1 foot 3 inches above the third landing. Only isolated fragments of wall plaster remain. A remnant of First Style decoration described by August Mau could not be visually identified but the 1995 analysis of plaster remains confirmed his observation. Writing in 1854, the Niccolinis thought the stairway led to the living quarters of the porter because of restricted width of the stairway.

Room 29 – Understairs cupboard space: This barrel-vaulted storage space is constructed of opus incertum covered with coarse white plaster above a red base. There is a window on the north wall. The room is paved with a simple screed floor. A septic tank occupies the western half of the room with a pit constructed of Sarno limestone with a depth of about 13 1/2 feet. Above the pit was a seat board, which left an imprint on the north wall at a height of about 16 inches above ground level.

== Notable finds ==
Four statuettes found around the mosaic fountain in the pseudo-peristyle included a bronze putto embracing a goose fitted with a water jet in the bird's beak, placed in the center of the fountain. A bronze seated angler wearing an exomis and gripping a fishing rod in one hand and a basket in the other and a marble sleeping fisher boy sculpture were both placed on the left side of the basin's edge. A fragmented archaeistic supporting figure was found standing on the right side of the fountain, according to a reproduction by F. Niccolini.

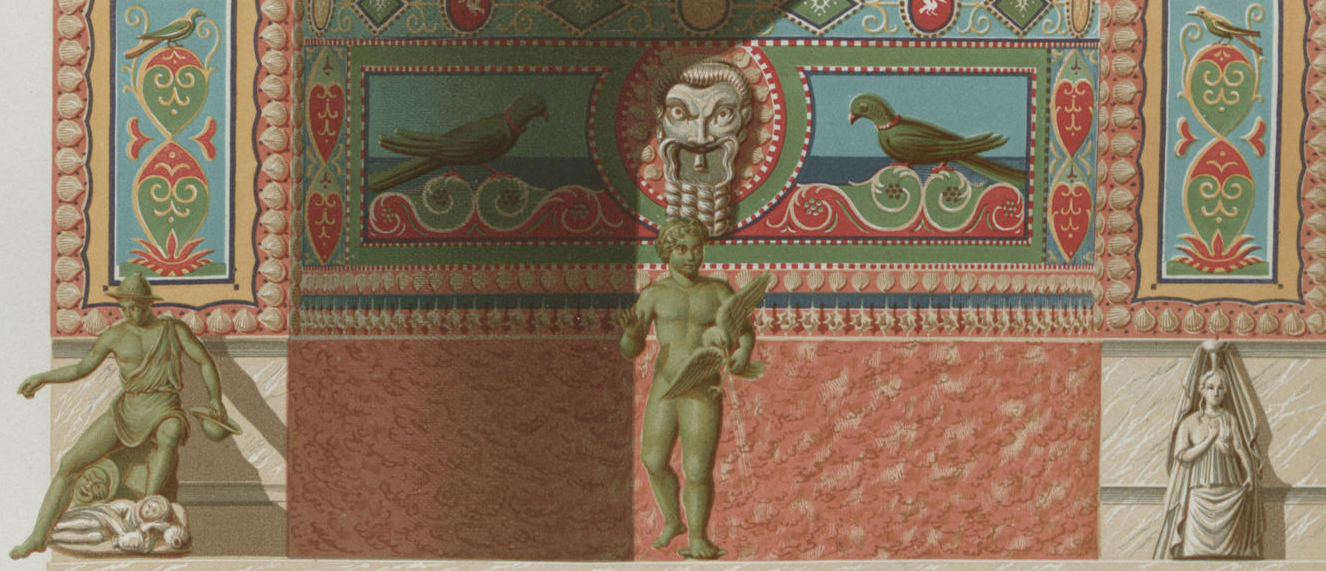
Fountain Sculptures by Giuseppe Abbate, G Frauenfelder, published by the Nicolini bros 1854

The seated fisherman with rod and basket was based on a Hellenistic original from the second half of the third century BCE and was one of many that have been found in Roman-era excavations dated up to late antiquity. Frolich and Stroka point to the shallow folds of the statuette's garment and its thick, turned up hem paralleling a statue of Augustus from Corinth dated to the late Augustan-Tiberian period as key to dating this statue as well.

Examples of Eros catching or holding a bird have been dated to as far back as fifth century BCE although comparable free-standing putti have been found only during the Hellenistic and Roman period. Similar statues found elsewhere in Pompeii include the goose-bearers from the Casa dei Vetti although they are considerably plumper.

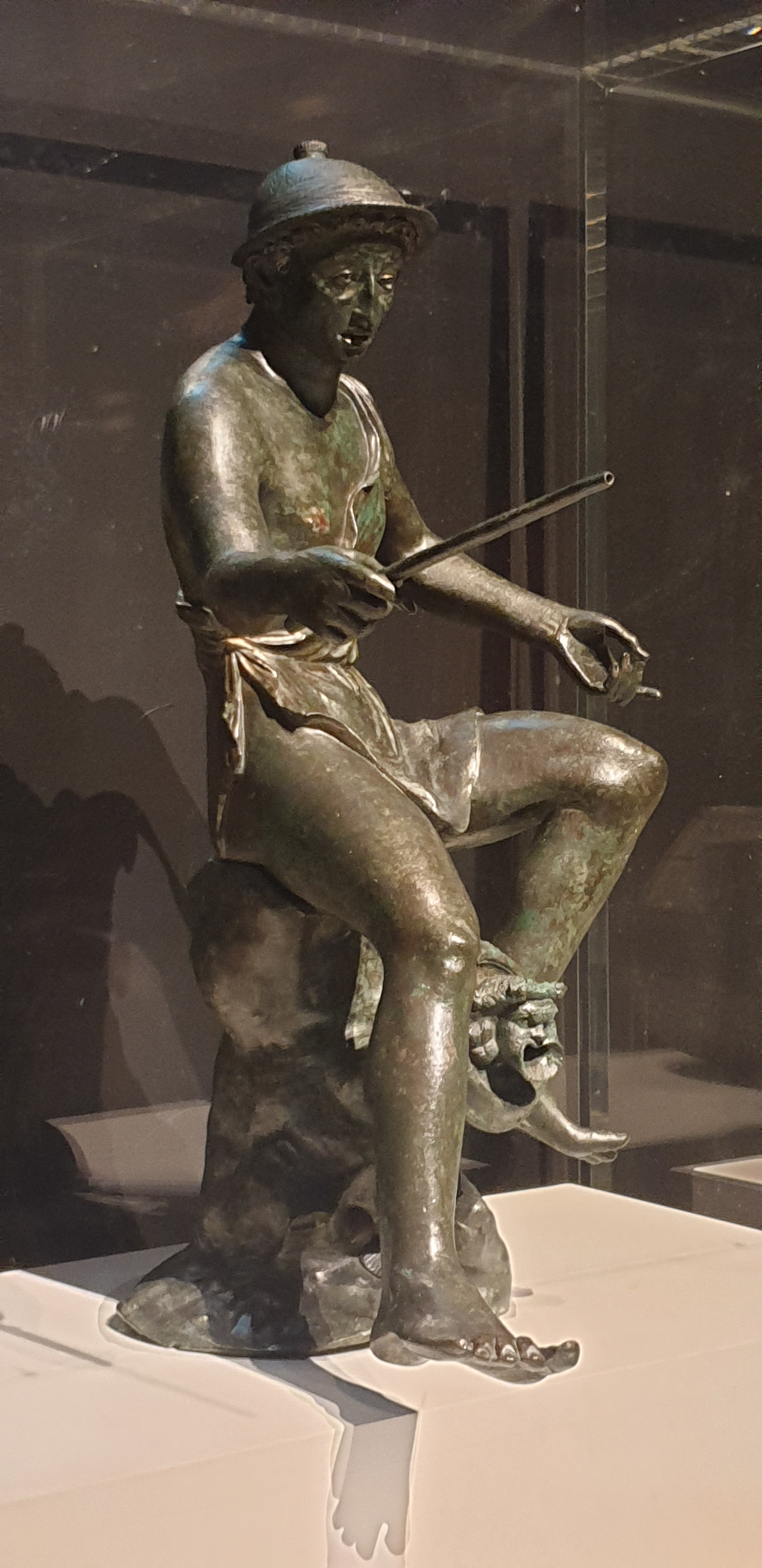
Bronze Fisherman with fountain spout

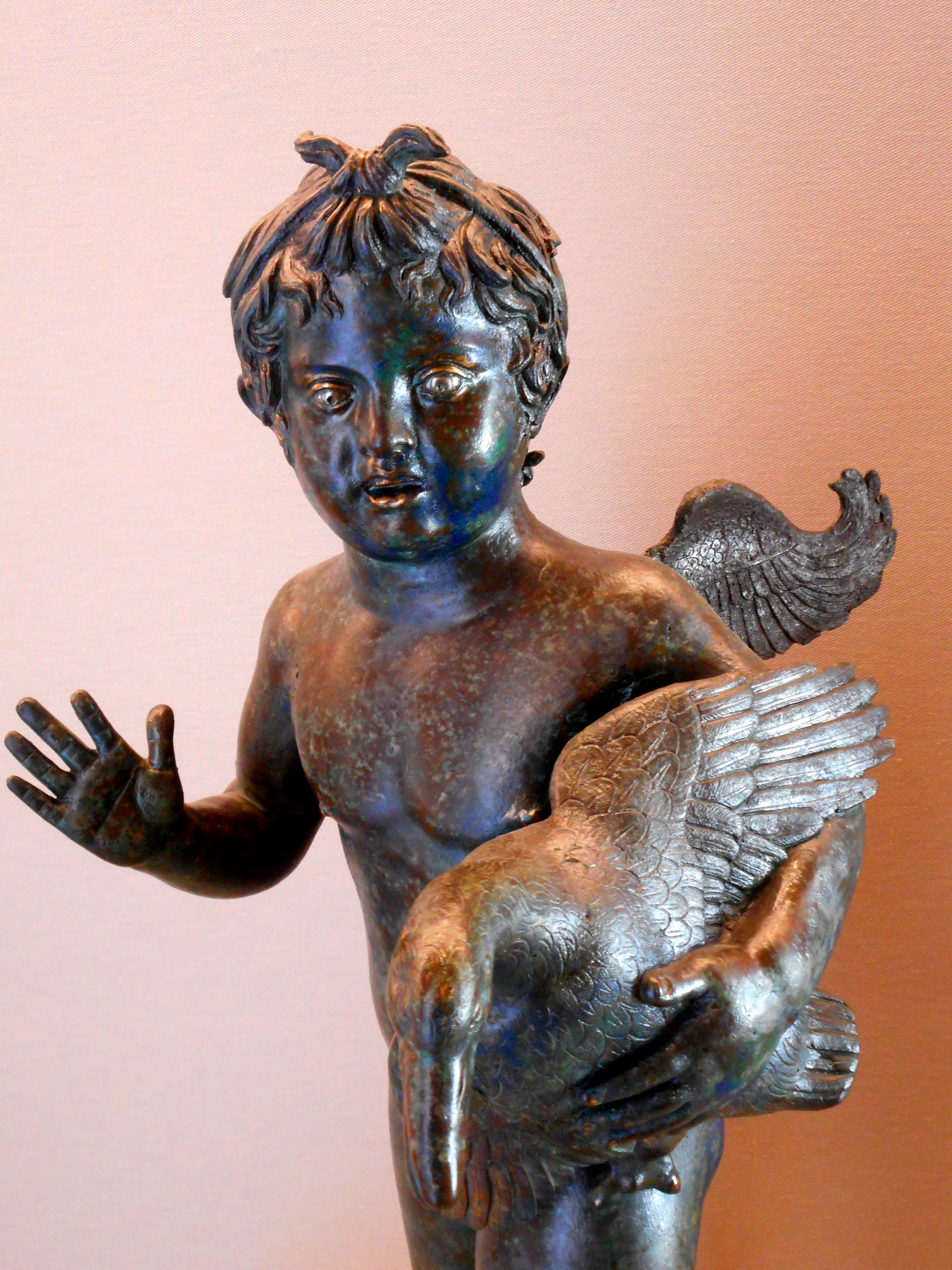
Bronze Cupid clutching a goose

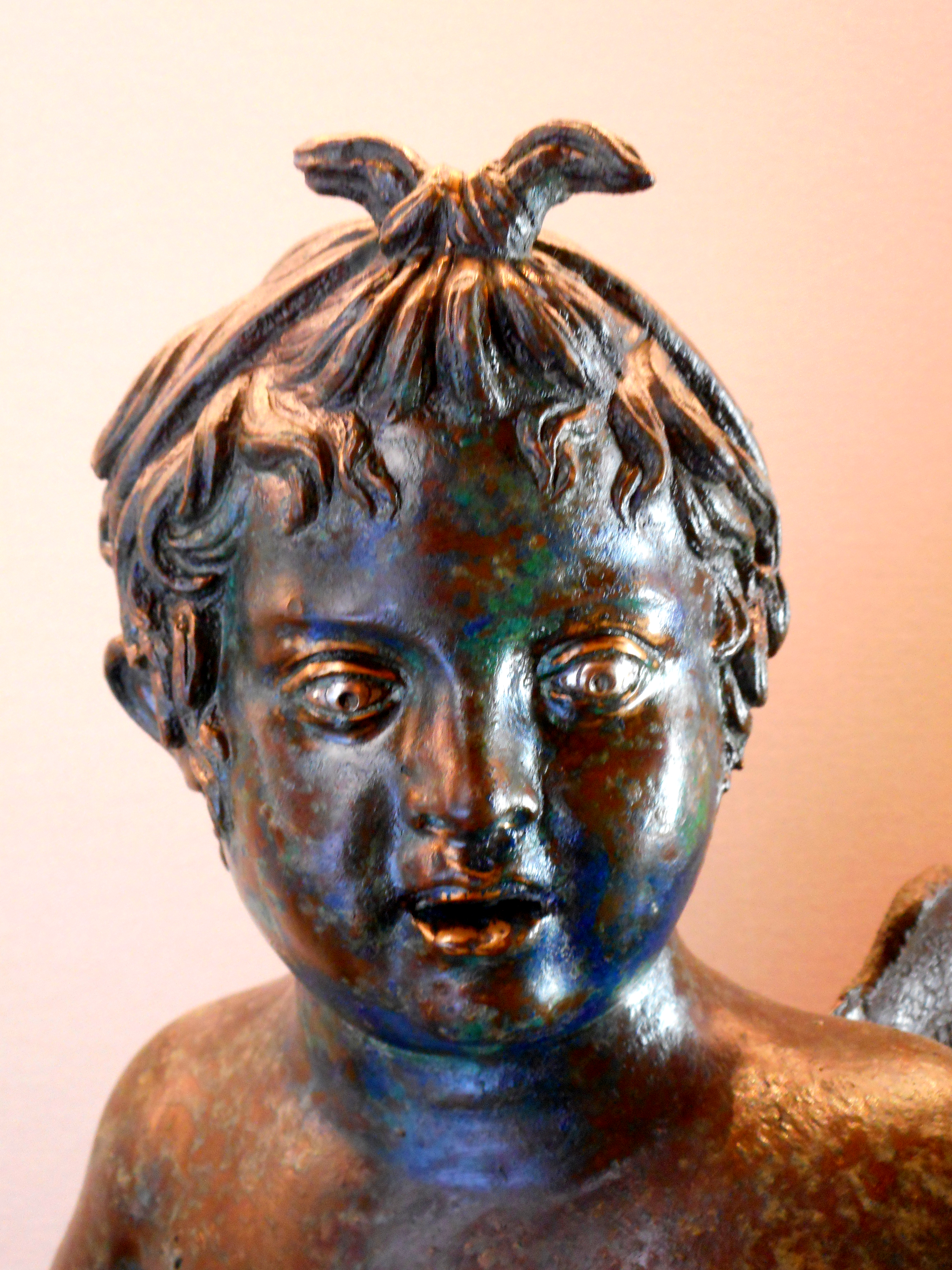
Closeup of the face of Cupid

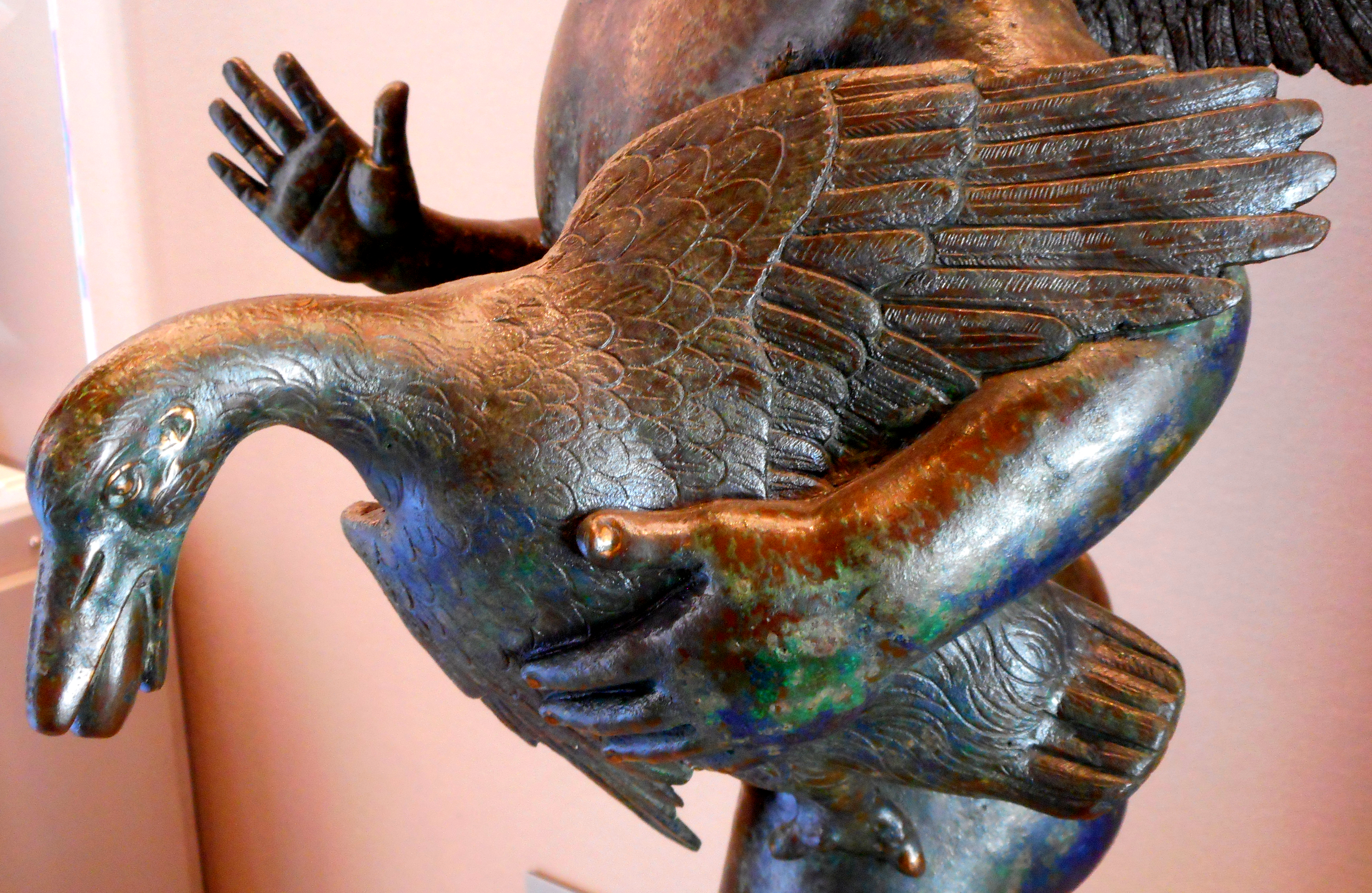
Closeup of the goose

Frolich and Strocka observe, "Taking into account the general stylistic development of the earlier imperial period, the closed cap of hair may be regarded as an indication of a relatively early origin. In addition, there are the small eyes with the flat eyeballs and the almost equally wide upper and lower eyelids, which can be observed similarly in the Hermes with the Ruler's Ribbon and in the Mercury Asclepius from the Casa delle Pareti rosse '[also in Pompeii]', both of which probably belong to the late Augustan or Tiberian period."

A number of sculptures of sleeping boy fishermen have been recovered from Roman-era excavations but Frolich and Stroka point to the face with its broad nose, small, contracted mouth and its carelessly executed smoothing as similar to a sleeping hermaphrodite recovered from the Casa di Loreio Tiburtino '[aka Casa di Ottavio Quartione]' with a suggested date of the first century CE.

Typologically comparable female archaistic support figures are encountered from the second half of the fifth century BCE through the Roman Imperial Period, although later examples are mainly tectonic supports so the archaeologists think the fragment is pre-imperial in origin.

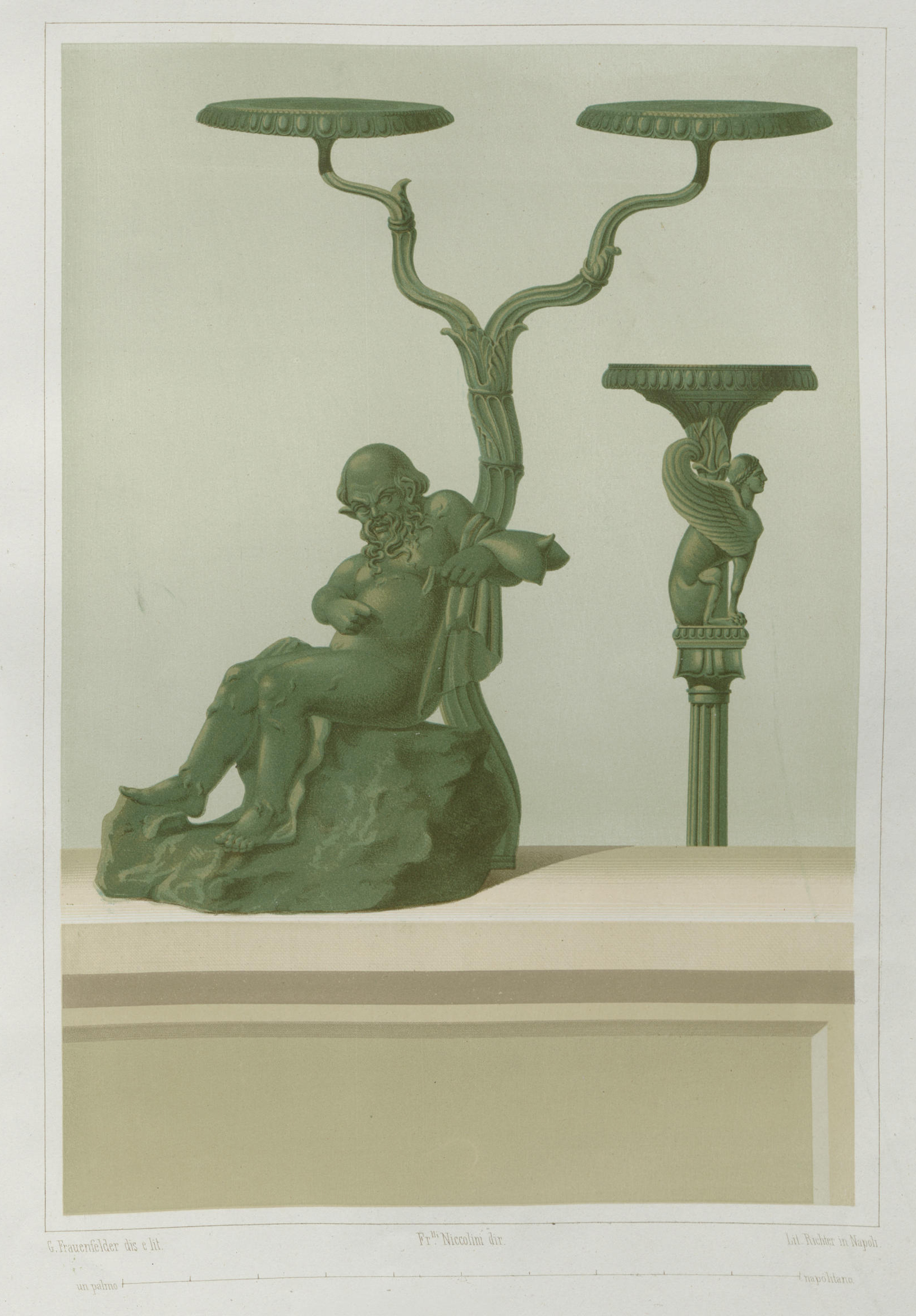
Drunken Silen double lampstand and sphinx candelabra House of the Second Fountain Pompeii by G Frauenfelder 1854

A lion-footed bronze candelabra topped with a sphinx was found in Ala 7. Although the austere palmettes of the base are reminiscent of classical Magna Graecia pieces, art historian E. Pernice dated the candelabra to the Augustan period. Frolich and Stroka, however, thought the Egyptian motif of the sphinx and shape of the chalice excludes such an early date and think the elements point to the beginning of the Imperial Period.

In atrium (2), a bronze figural lampstand depicting Silenus with two lamp plates was found, possibly as a result of falling from a room in the upper floor. The piece is quite similar to a double lampstand with a leaning Silenus found in Herculaneum and archaeologists think they both may have originated from the same workshop. The Herculaneum piece has been dated to the end of the first century BCE. "The demanding composition, which captures, in the complicated torsion of the body, exactly that moment in which the already drunken Silenus tries to refill his cup insecurely and swaying, while at the same time the robe slips down from his right thigh, identifies the lamp stand as a late Hellenistic work," Frolich and Stroka observe.

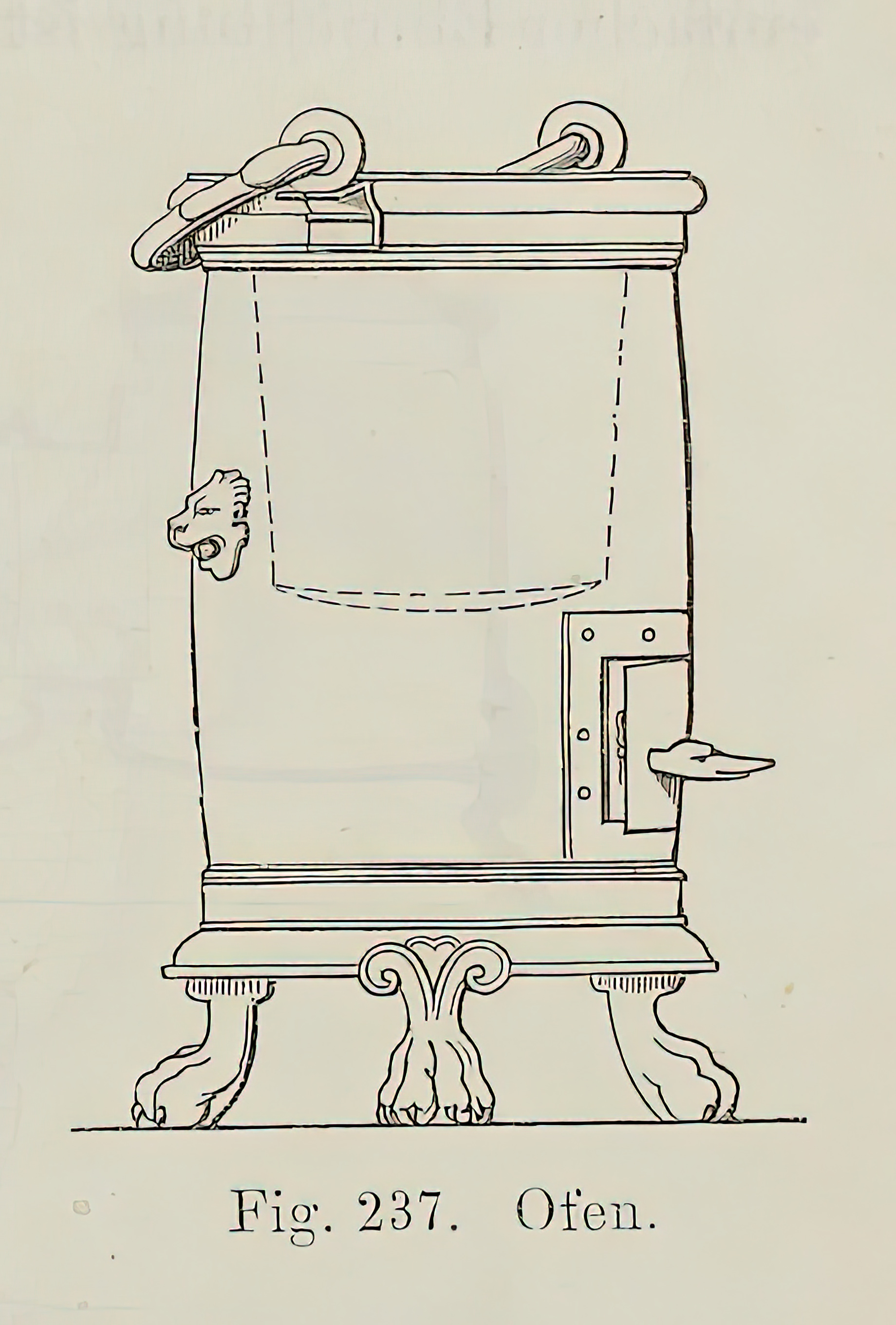
Drawing of the bronze Roman stove (water furnace) from the House of the Small Fountain Pompeii Overbeck-Mau 1884

A bronze water furnace was also found in the same location (Atrium 2). The cylindrical piece, resting on three lion feet with a small door in the form of a goose head for adding and igniting fuel, contained a high-walled pot to hold water or other liquid. It was far simpler than so-called samovars found elsewhere in Pompeii. It was destroyed, however, when workmen attempted to move it to the museum.

In Ala (7) two gold bracelets and armlets set with green stones were found. Bronze cooking and serving ware, coins, lanterns, terracotta oil lamps, paterae, cups, locks, stools, a mirror, statuettes of deities including Mercury, a fragmented horse sculpture, bottles and juglets, a pruning knife, oilers, scales and lead weights, basin and strigils, and a base and garnish for a dining couch were discovered in the house.

== Occupants ==
Archaeologists Frolich and Strocka consider the largest of the two original structures with the main entrance at 23 an example of atrium houses without side rooms comparable in concept to the House of Paquius Proculus. Like other houses along the Via di Mercurio, its main entrances open onto this prestigious street reflecting the owner's choice to own a house on a major main street close to the Forum. The fact that the house has a well-appointed tablinum as a place for the morning salutatio and public reception reflects the owner's social status as a patron with clients, but not as a member of one of the most distinguished families of the late Samnite period inhabiting more palatial quarters like the nearby Casa di Pansa.

The house accessed through entrance 24 was much more modest and archaeologists speculate that originally a workshop may have been attached. It is thought its much smaller atrium was probably used for practical activities rather than representation.

The First Style facade with rows of ashlars and imitation stucco found on both structures expresses pretension, but the owner apparently could not afford a tufa facade seen on more prestigious homes of the second century BCE.

The two houses were apparently integrated during the Augustan period and it is thought an upper floor above the rooms on the east side was added. Research in 1993 indicated that a number of Pompeian houses had upper floors for rented dwellings constructed during the first century CE including the period after the earthquake of 62 CE. Frolich and Stroka point to the general population growth and increasing familia size in the Imperial period, including relatives and/or freedmen and their families and the need for additional revenue, as leading to this development.

During this time, Tablinum 8 and Ticlinium 11 were also reoriented towards the peristyle by widening their rear doorways and closing a connecting door to Ala 7. This shift of focus towards the peristyle or garden is seen in a number of atrium houses at the time including the Casa del Menandro, the Casa di Sallustio, and the Casa del Toro. These changes point to the diminishing importance of the atrium. This is further evidenced by the owner's reconstruction and redecoration of Ala 7, Room 9, and the peristyle after the earthquake of 62 CE while leaving the atrium unfinished.

"The finding in the Casa della Fontana Piccola thus confirms the traditional research opinion, according to which the atrium house as a type has been losing more and more importance since the first century BCE and was finally replaced by the peristyle house and the insula. This development is usually seen as a consequence of the gradual weakening of the republican aristocracy and the clientele associated with it, which was replaced by the ever stronger imperial central power. The atrium house disappears as an expression and means of the republican social order together with it." explain Frolich and Stroka.

However, E. Dwyer disagrees pointing to the continued presence of atrium houses in Pompeii right up to the eruption in 79 CE, indicating the clientele system also continued to function into the Flavian period. However, although Andrew Wallace-Hadrill's house size surveys of Pompeii and Herculaneum have shown atrium houses still predominated up to the time of the eruption, Frolich and Stroka point out that many of those atriums were inherited building fabric that were no longer used and appreciated in the same way they were 200 years earlier.

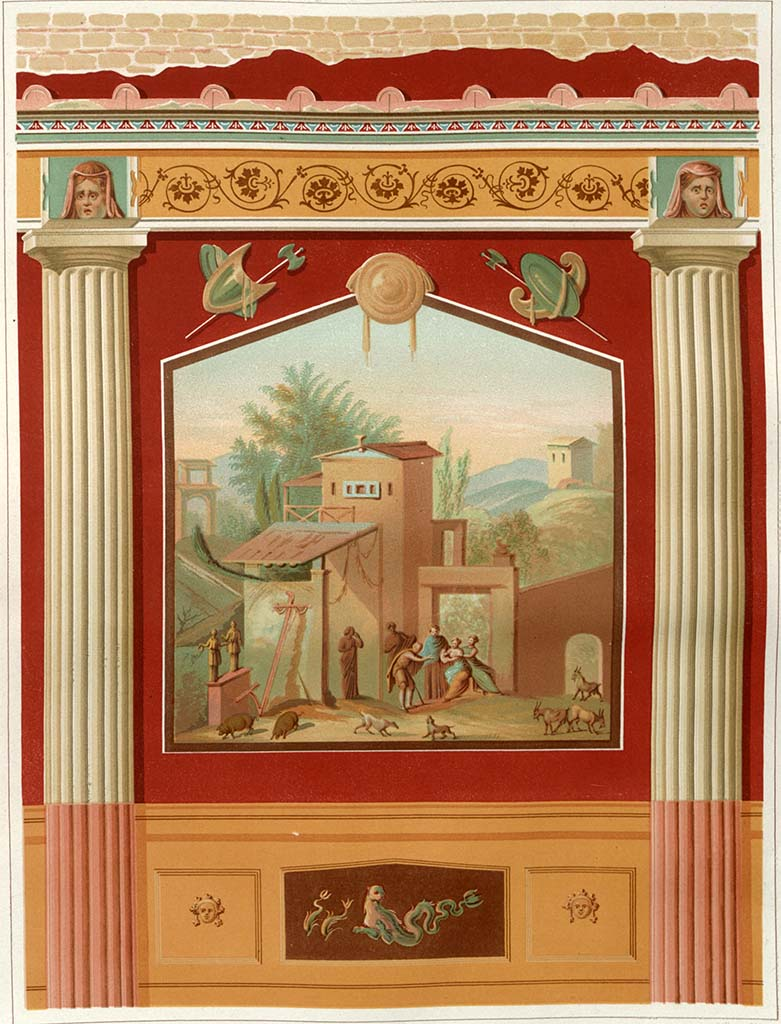
Painting from west wall, on north side of fountain, in the peristye (Room 10) by F Niccolini. Note shields and weapons and sea creature in dado.

Instead, the German archaeologists point to alternate available meeting spaces in the house such as the porticus, and Room 11 or 24, that could be used for larger guest banquets, as well as elaborately decorated Cubicula 14 and 15 for more intimate discussions, such as with political or business friends. It is thought Room 9 just to the left of entrance 23 and Ala 7 without a wall separating it from Atrium 2 and somewhat less lavishly decorated, were probably suitable for meetings with people with whom one wished to maintain a greater distance and not provide access to the house's more private spaces in the rear of the structure. Frolich and Stroka suggest a resident with the need to meet with this wide range of people was possibly a member of Pompeii's Ordo, although no items inscribed with the owner's name and listed among the 80 families known to have served as such magistrates was ever found in the home.

"...Pompeian gentry differed in one fundamental particular from the great nobility of Rome," observes Mary L. Gordon in her article The Ordo of Pompeii. "They possessed a long tradition of maritime trade. Pompeii was favorably situated for such enterprises, and it would seem that the Greek and Etruscan traditions of seafaring commerce were adopted by the Oscans of the plain, and even by the Samnite conquerors," She points out that the emphasis on commerce and maritime trade was reflected in the decoration of households known to belong to the Ordo. Along with Bacchic attributes painted on the walls, rooms are decorated with images of weapons and shields as well. The manufacture of arms, of all trades, was considered the most appropriate to old nobility. The House of Lucretius, owned by a listed member of the Ordo, contained various suggestions of foreign trade, including two sea-centaurs, in its decorations.

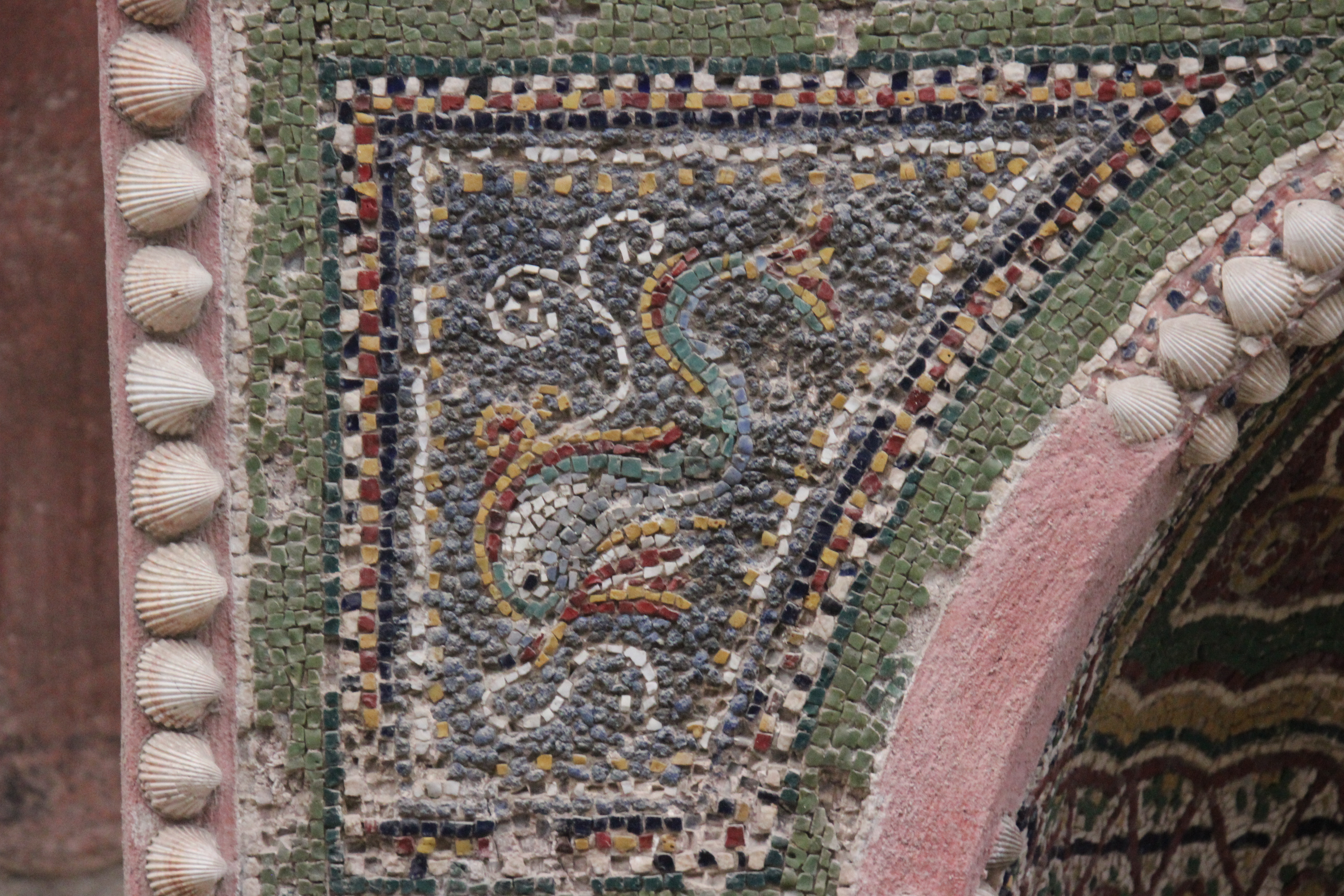
Dolphin mosaic on upper left face of peristyle fountain

These are also seen in the House of the Small Fountain, including frescos depicting ports with boats as well as shields and weapons in the structure's peristyle. Mythical sea creatures and dolphins are found in the pattern of the mosaic fountain and in the dado panels, too.

The German archaeologists also suggest that the decorations of the house, all in the Fourth Style except for the First Style facade, points to an owner with a less traditional attitude, especially considering the total absence of mythological central paintings. "Perhaps this simply expresses a lack of interest in the themes of "great painting," which in the period of the Fourth Style sometimes congealed into dry academic doctrines anyway," Frolich and Stroka observe. "The model of the villa may have exerted an influence here as well, since it is precisely the decorations of large complexes such as the Villa di S. Marco in Stabiae that are rather restrainedly elegant or even simple, like those of the Villa di Diomede. Instead of presenting mythological themes, one restricts oneself to restrained symbolism, which mostly represents cheerful, Dionysian things, for example the panther with a thyrsos in Room 9 or the theater mask pictures in the Tablinum 19."

Although the house reflects a thematic limitation, they admit the owner was obviously prosperous, however, as demonstrated by the quality of the paintings ranging from above-average to the highest quality and the numerous bronze objects found throughout the house.
