= Luigi Bazzani =

Italian painter

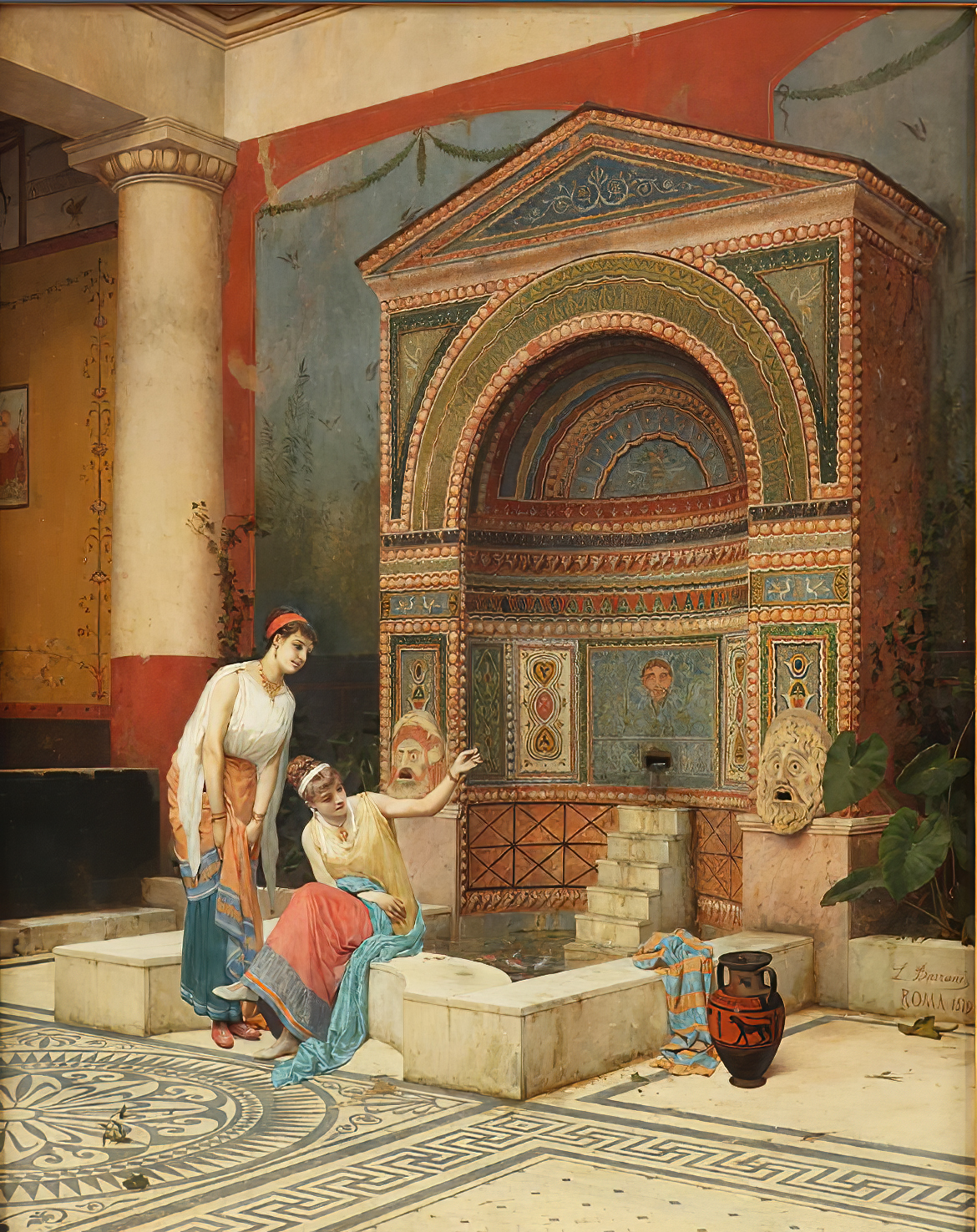
- Women feeding fish in a Pompeian Atrium by Luigi Bazzani
- Born: Luigi Bazzani; 8 November 1836; Bologna, Papal States
- Died: 2 February 1927 (aged 91); Rome, Italy
- Known for: Painting
- Movement: Academicism, Neoclassicism

Luigi Bazzani (November 8, 1836 – February 2, 1927), also called Il Bazzanetto, was an Italian painter, illustrator, and watercolorist. He was born in Bologna. Bazzani studied at Bologna's Accademia di Belle Arti then traveled to France, Germany and, eventually, Rome where he settled down in 1861 and began to specialize in genre and landscape subjects as well as set designs for theaters. Many of his paintings featured the remains of the city's monuments from classical antiquity.

== Documentation of Pompeii excavations ==
Inspired by the rediscovery of Pompeii in 1748, he spent 35 years of his life from approximately 1880 to 1915 documenting the ruins of the ancient city that had been exposed by ongoing excavations with watercolor paintings. Bazzani experimented with the techniques of architectural relief, an aspect so far little known but of great interest for archaeological research and his attention to detail was prized by scientists working at the site. His often exquisitely muted colors and his superb technical skill enabled him to replicate antique stone, whether chipped facing or other decaying aspects of it. At the time of Bazzani's work in Pompeii, the freshly excavated remains were still vibrant with original paint.

He contributed a series of fourteen illustrations to a publication by Pompeii's leading archaeologist Amedeo Maiuri. Since then, however, many interiors have been lost to deterioration. So his work has been a valuable resource for modern archaeologists and scholars as well.

== Exhibitions ==
Beginning in 1895, Bazzani exhibited regularly in Rome, Vienna, Munich, Berlin, and Paris. He also taught perspective and set design at the Academia di Belle Arti in Rome from 1892 to 1896 with Ludovico Zeit and had prize-winning artist Luigi Savoldi as a pupil. Eventually, Bazzani became a member of academies in Rome, Bologna, and Perugia. In 2013, the exhibition "Really! The Pompeii of the late 1800s in the painting of Luigi Bazzani" was presented by The Fondazione del Monte di Bologna, in collaboration with the University of Bologna (Department of History, Civilization Cultures, Section of Archeology). It included a multimedia application developed by the Italian consortium of universities and research centers known as Cineca that integrated images of Bazzani's watercolors into their appropriate locations in Pompeii's archaeological structures as viewed through Google Earth.

== Gallery ==
=== Pompeii watercolors (See more by clicking on the Wikimedia Commons link) ===
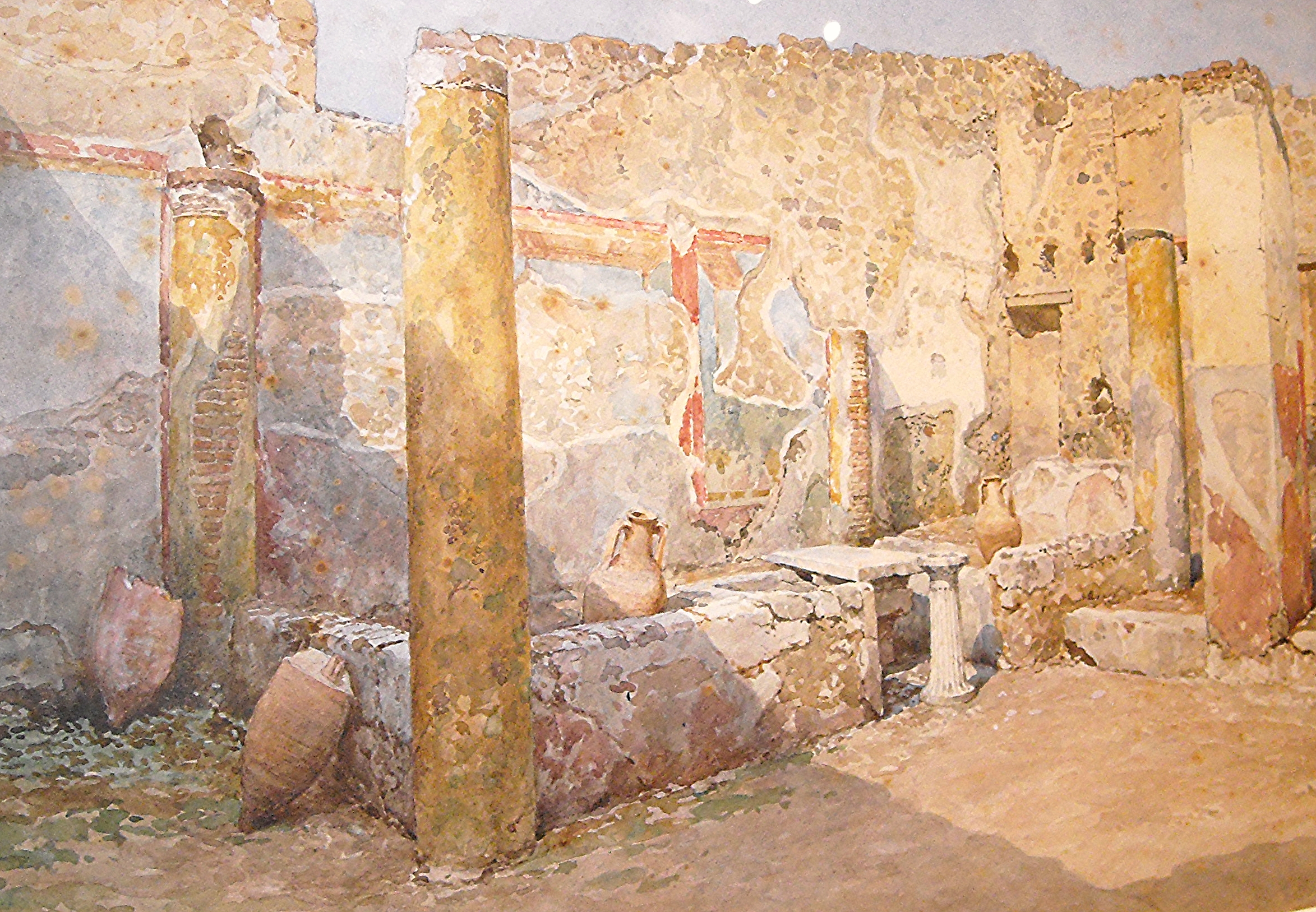
Summer Triclinium of House V, 2, 15, 1914

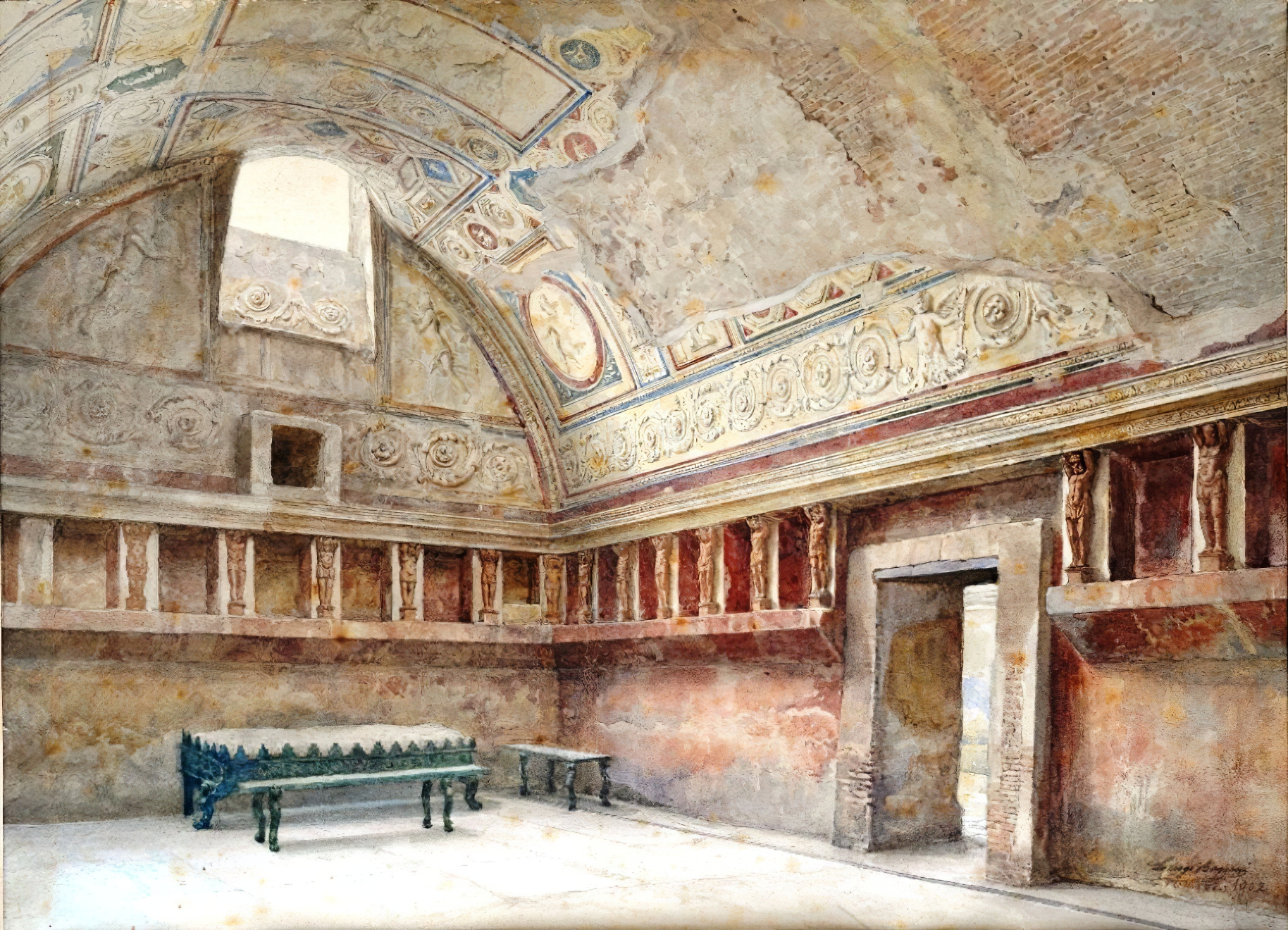
Pompeii Bath

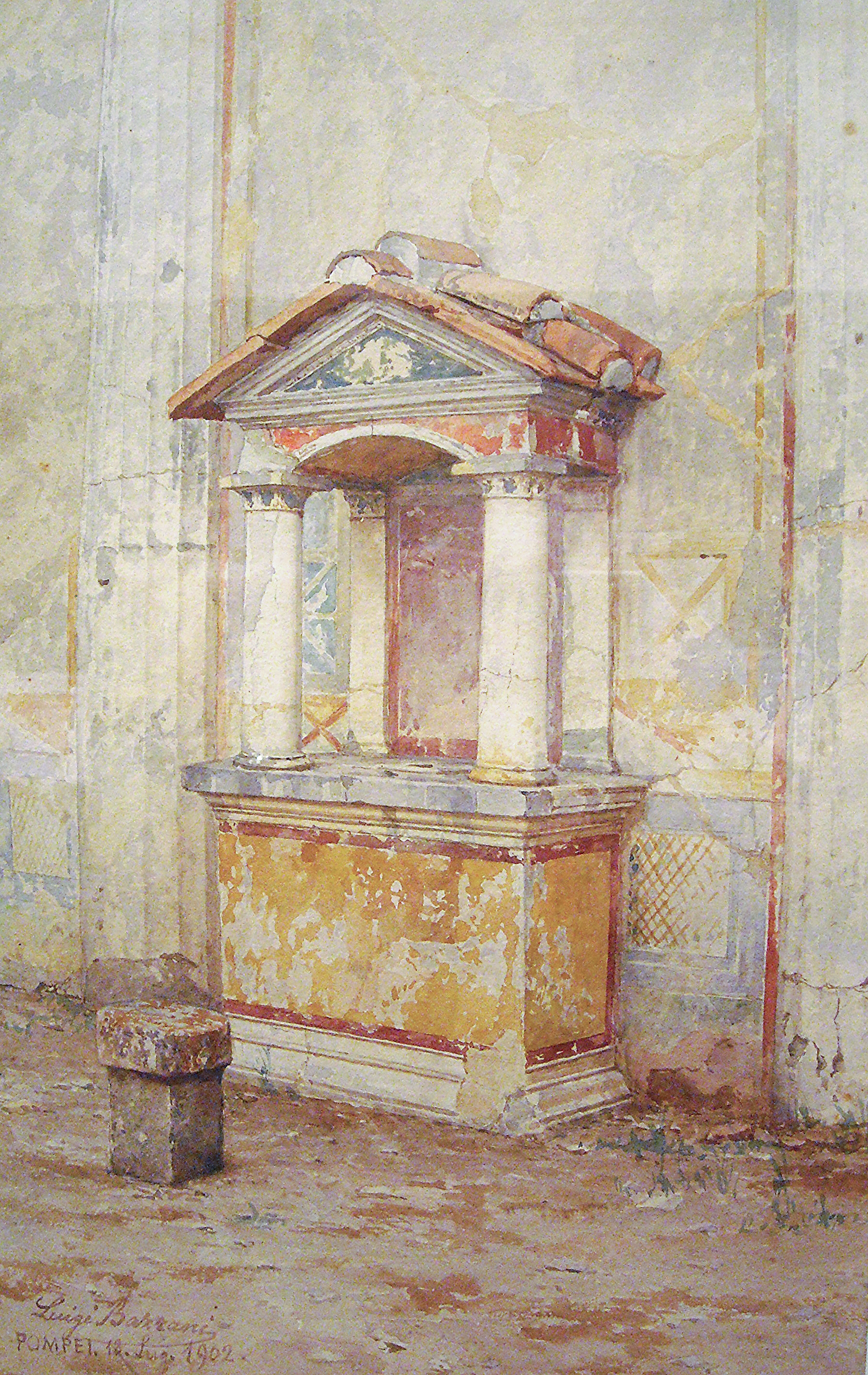
Lararium of the House of Dioscuri, 1902

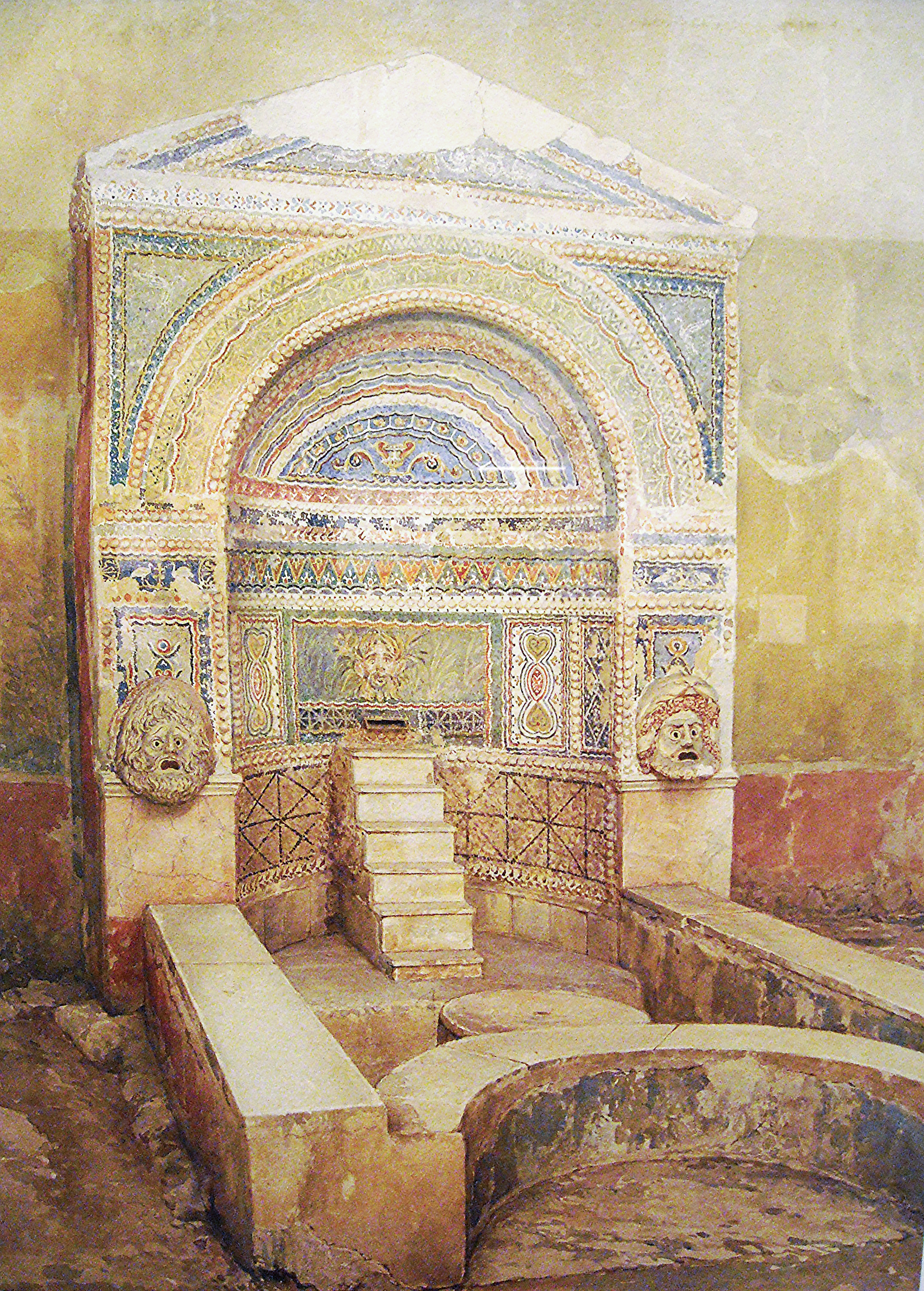
House of the Great Fountain

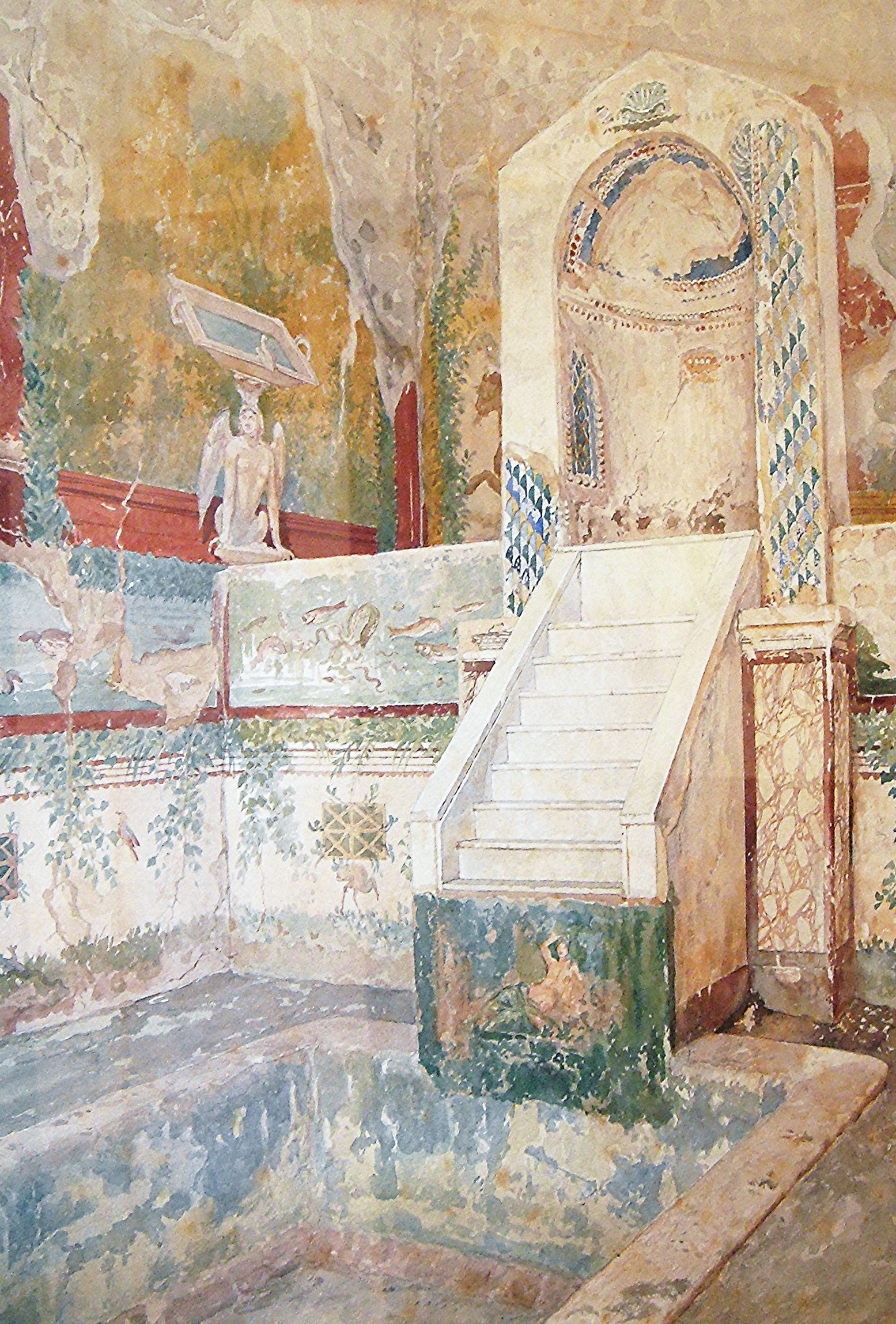
Atrium of the House of the Centenary, 1901

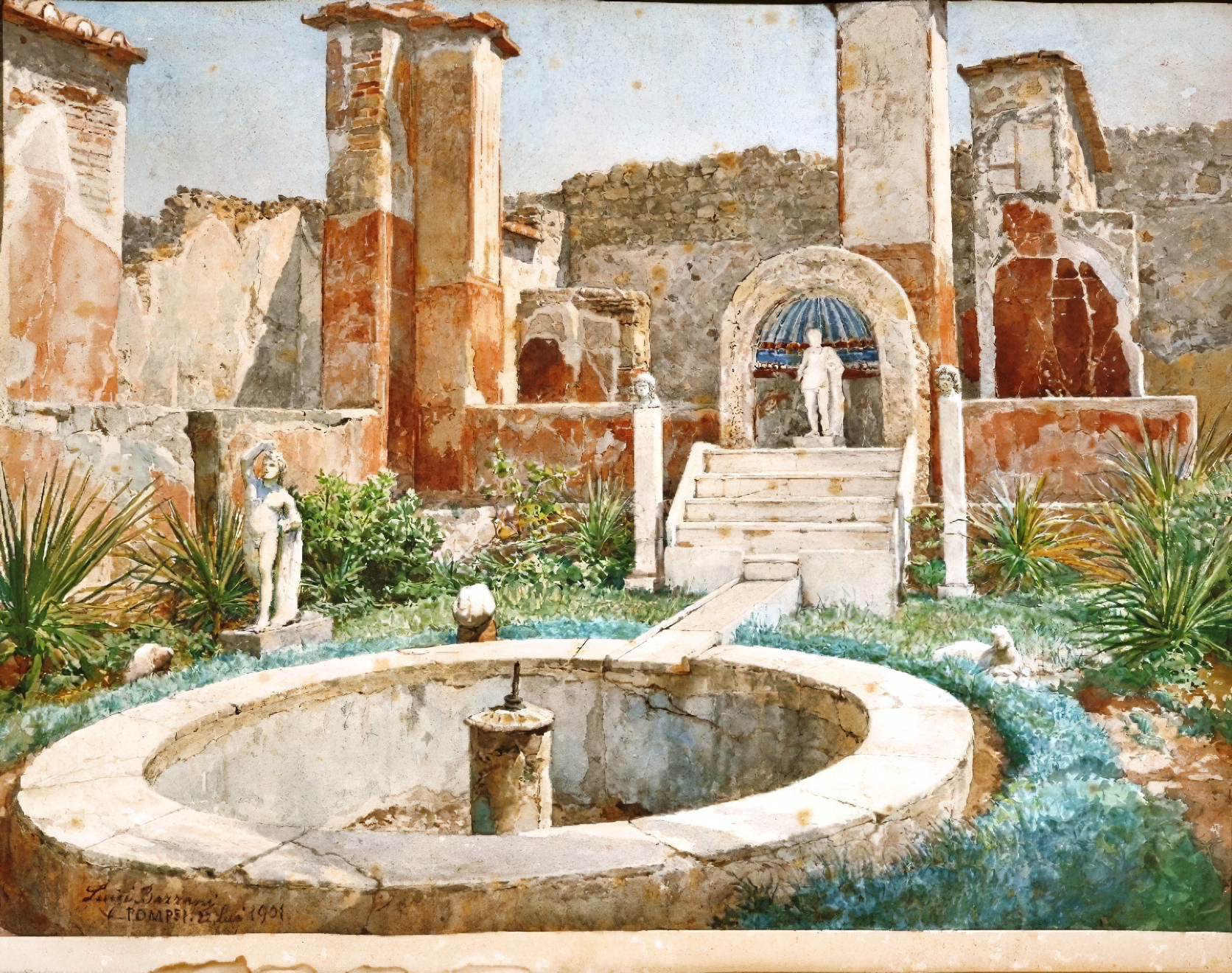
Peristyle with fountain in the House of Marcus Lucretius

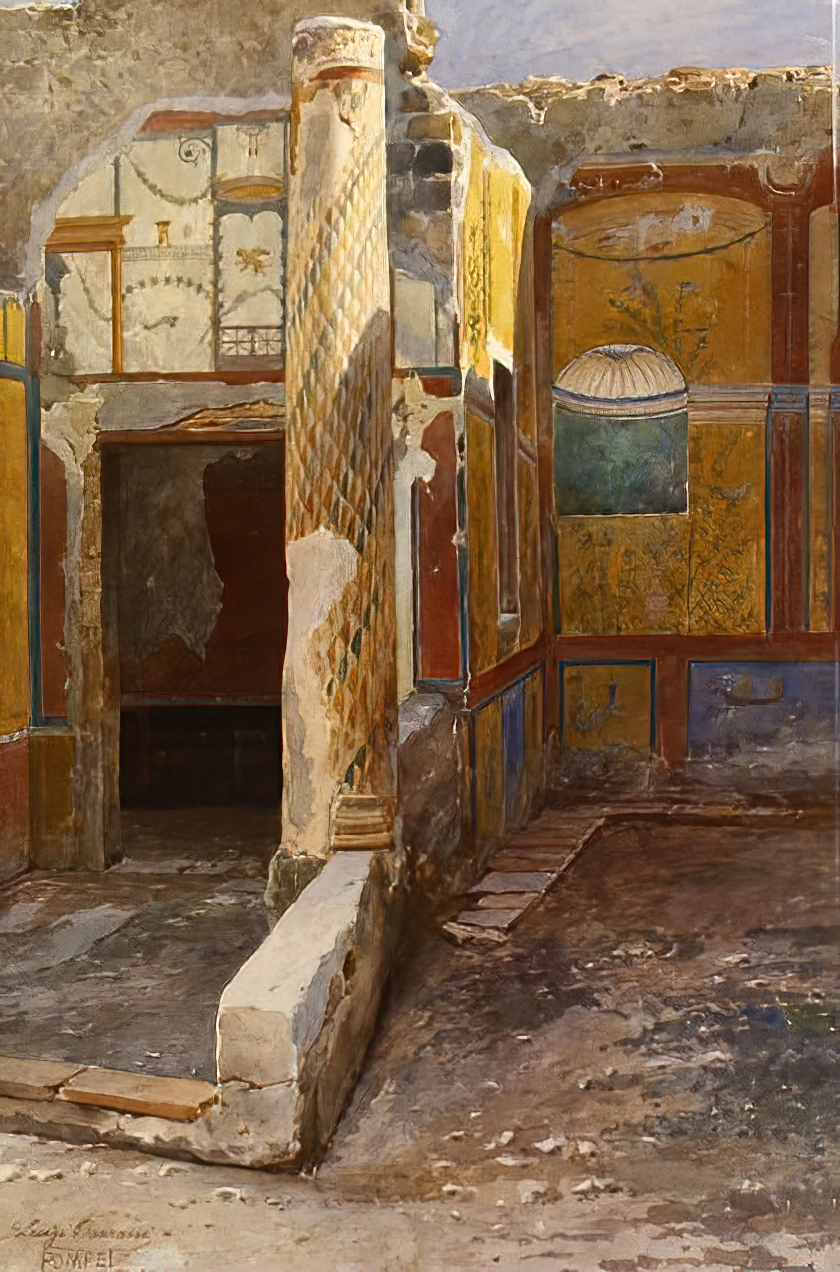
Pompeii Interior

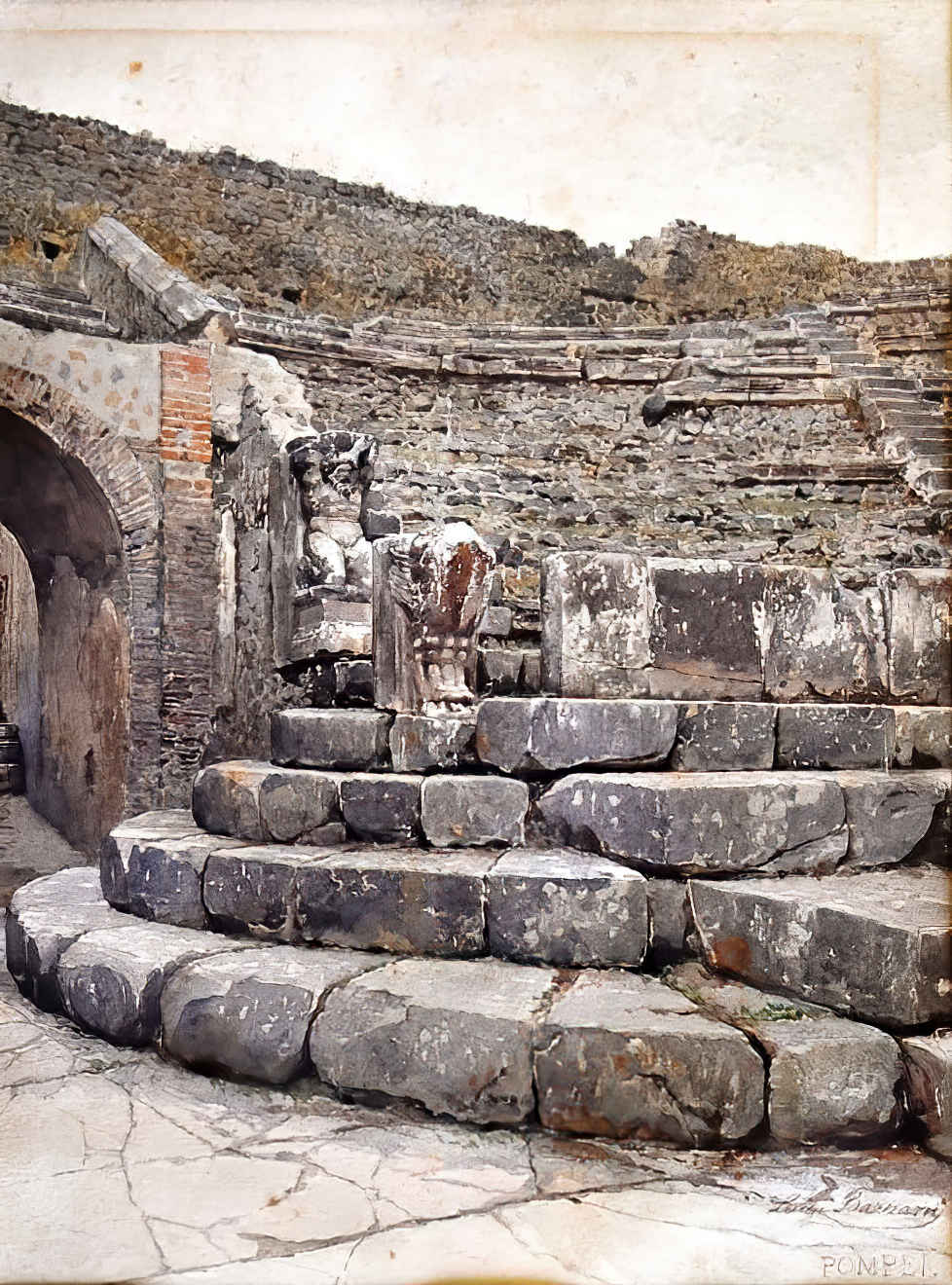
Pompeii theater

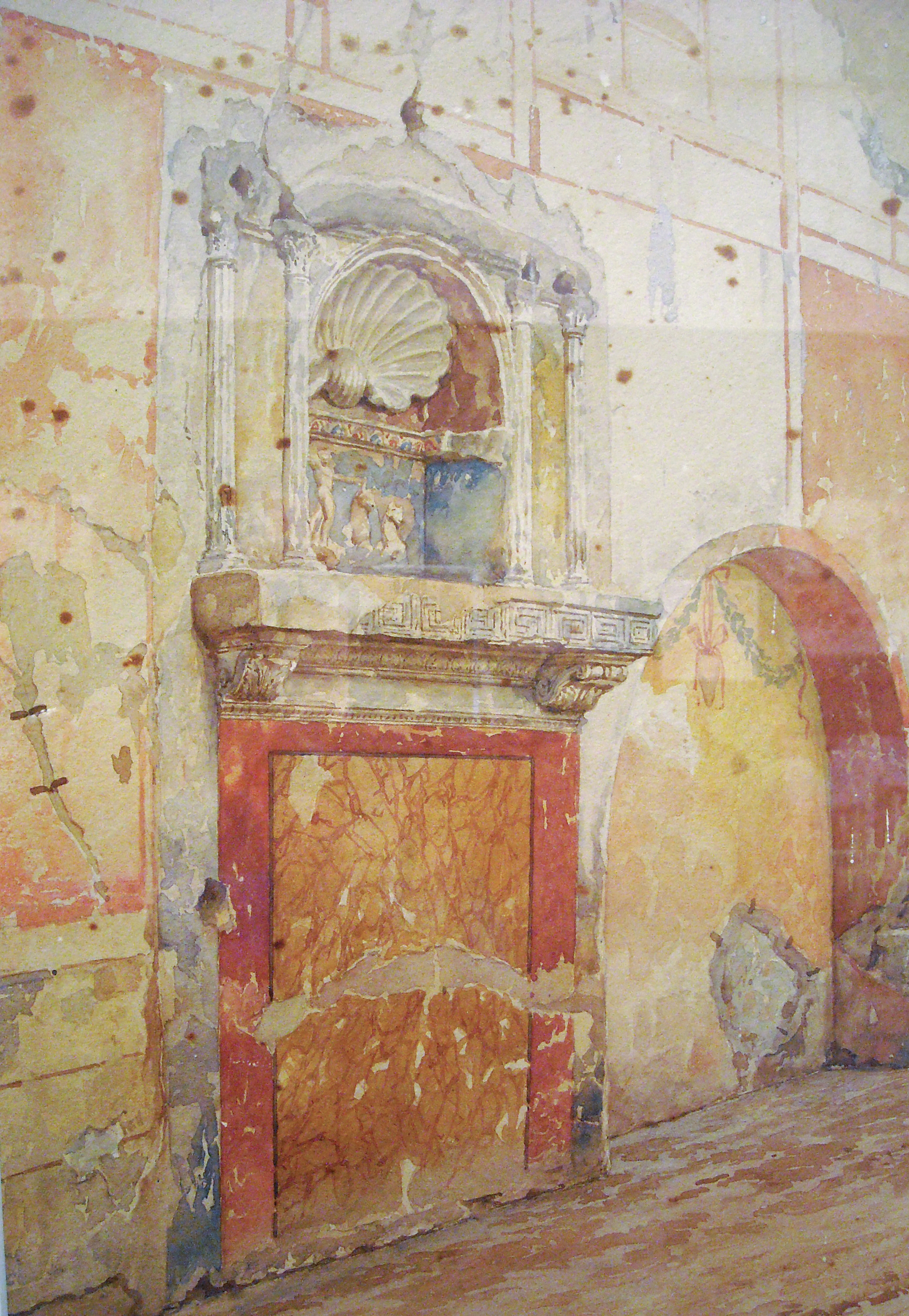
Lararium of the House IX,1,7, Pompeii, 1903

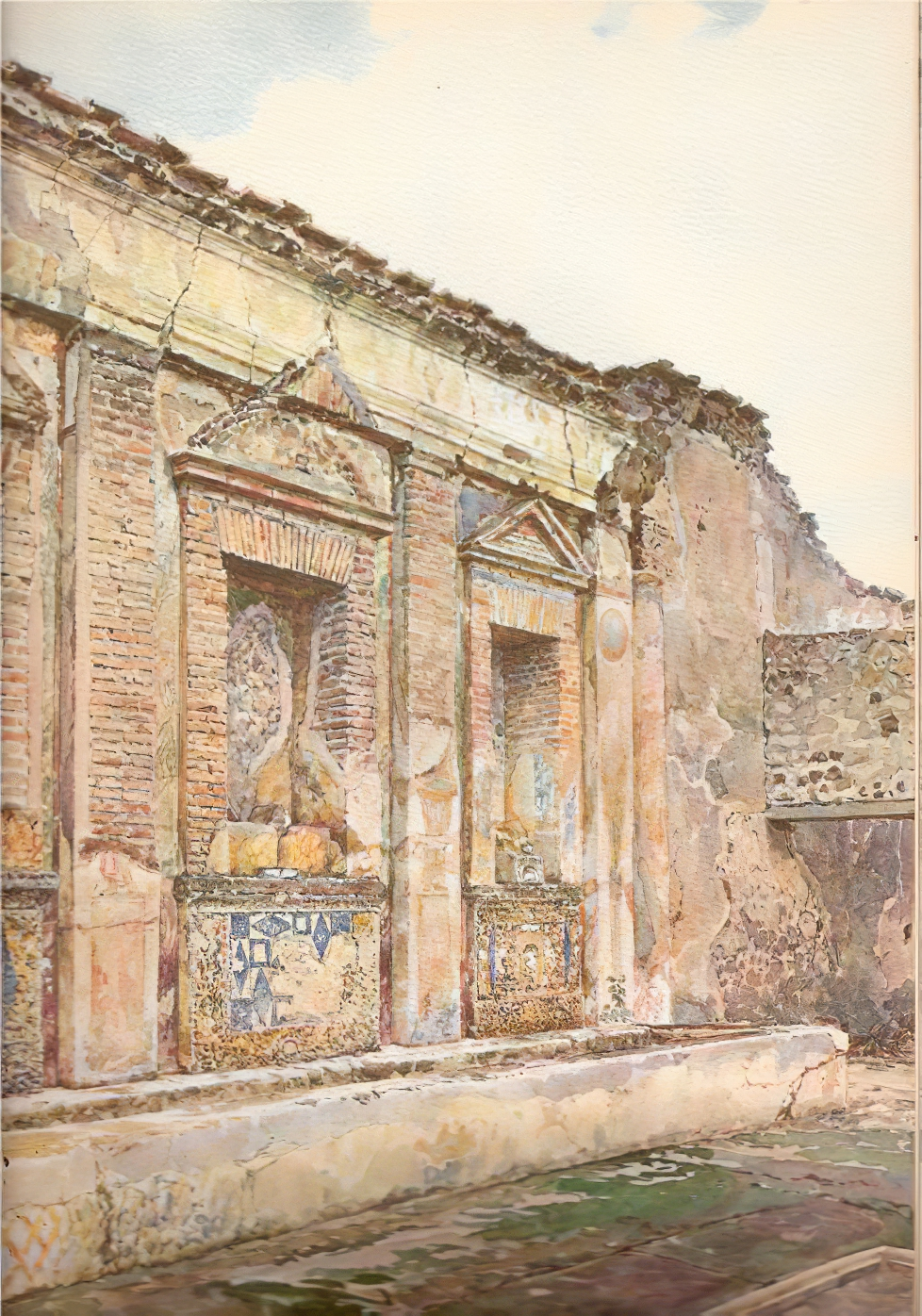
Nymphaeum at the House of the Bull, 1901

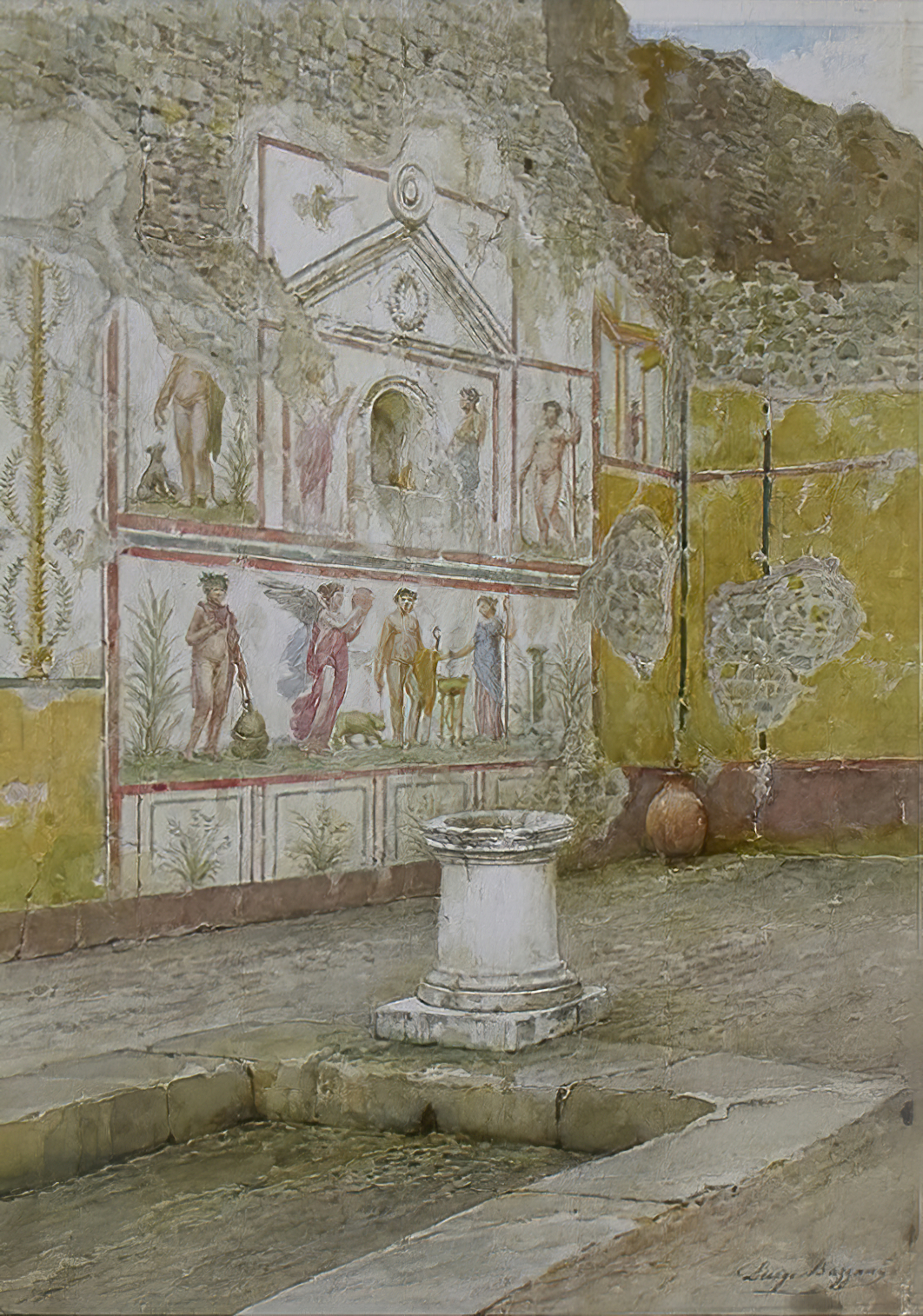
Atrium of the House of the Mariner

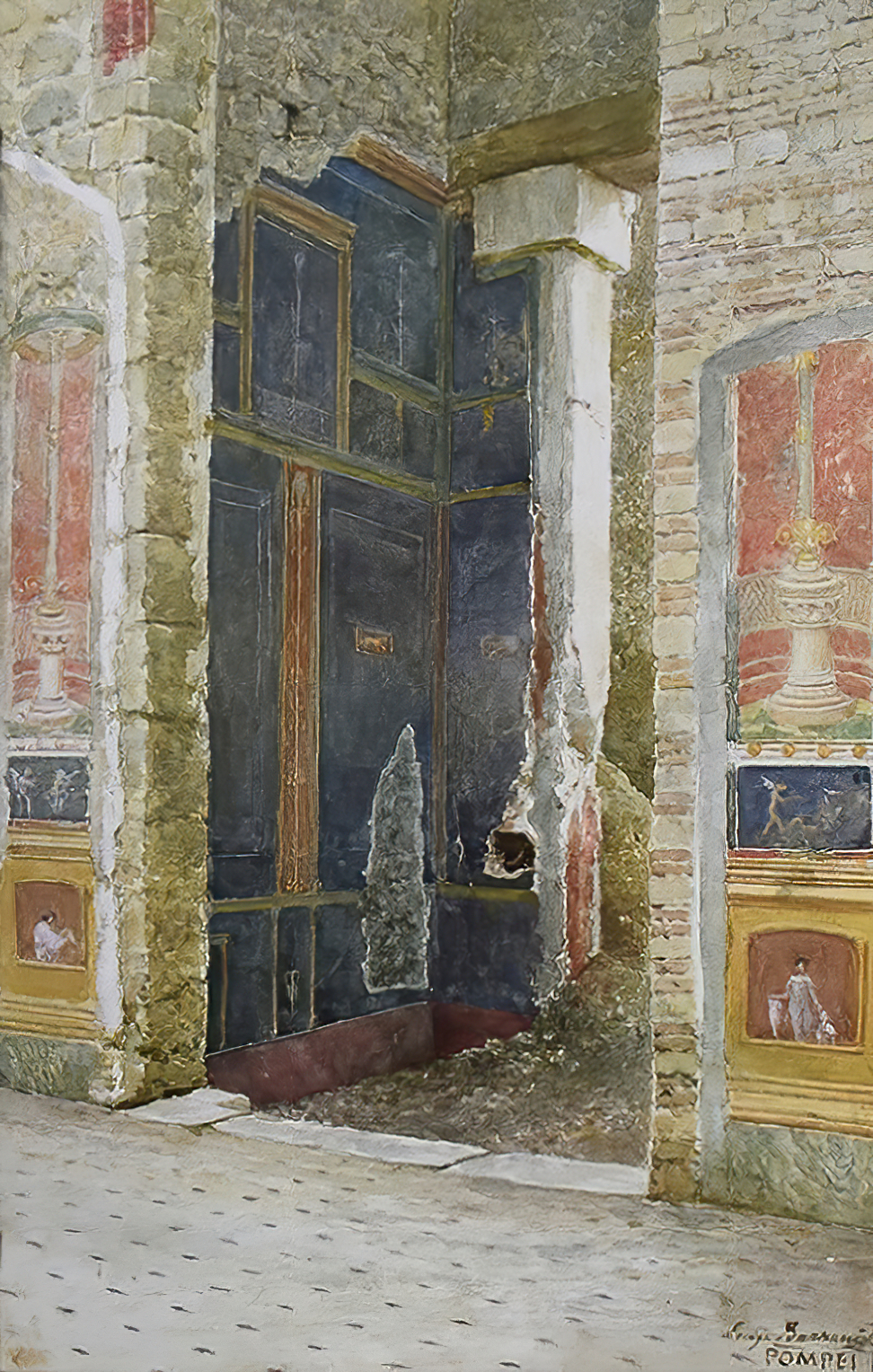
House of the Vetti

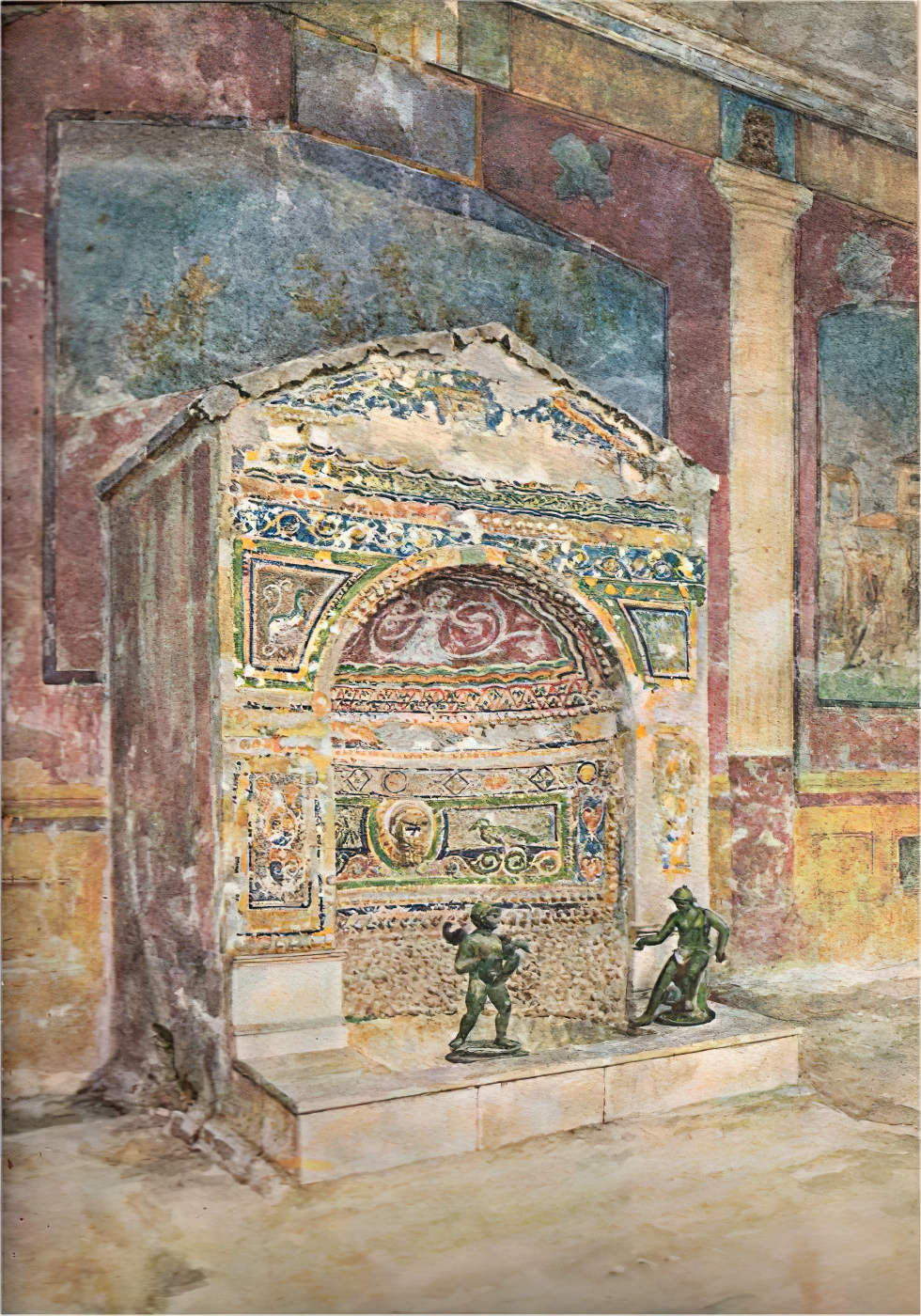
House of the Small Fountain

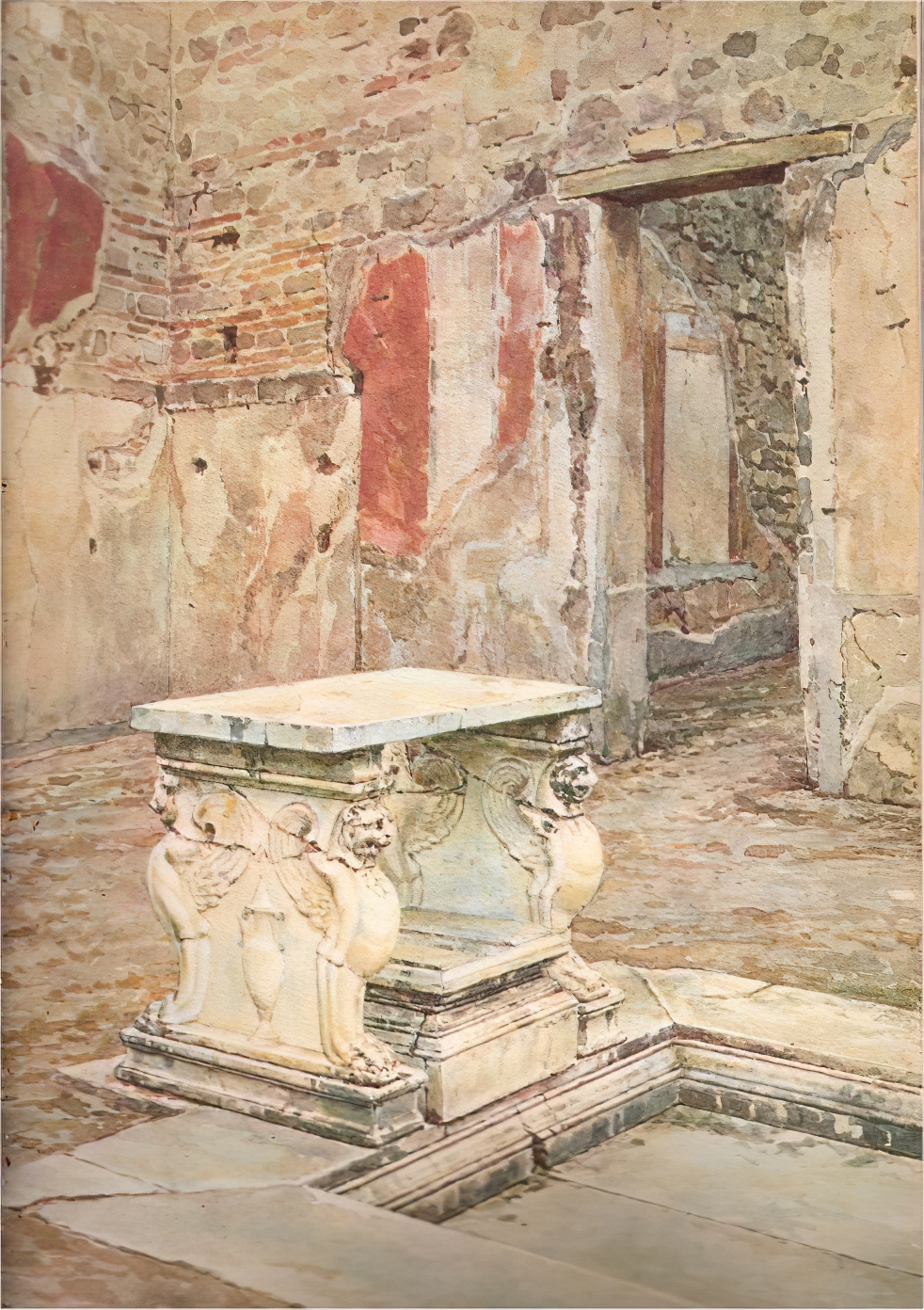
House with impluvium and marble table

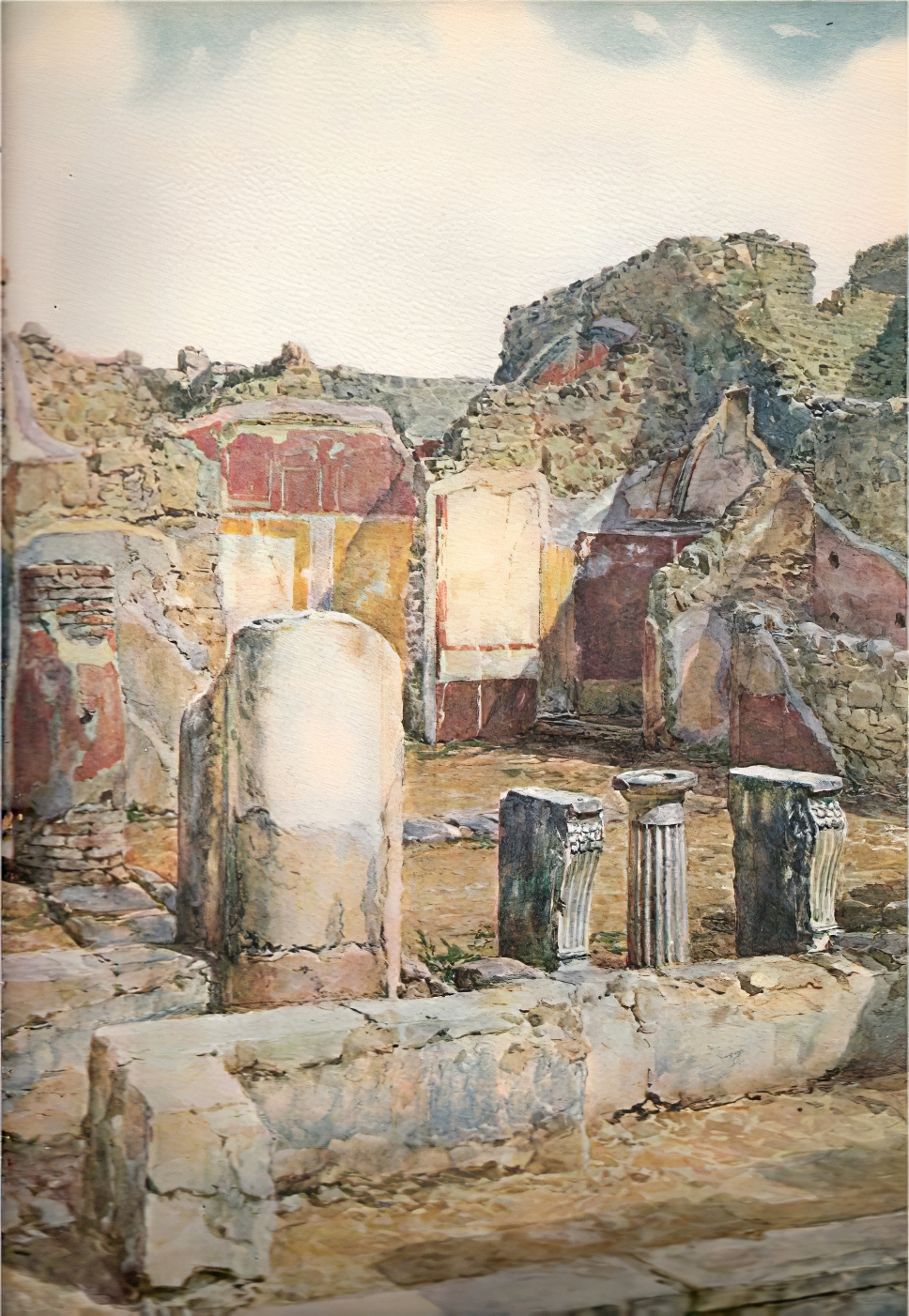
Insula in Region IX, V, 18

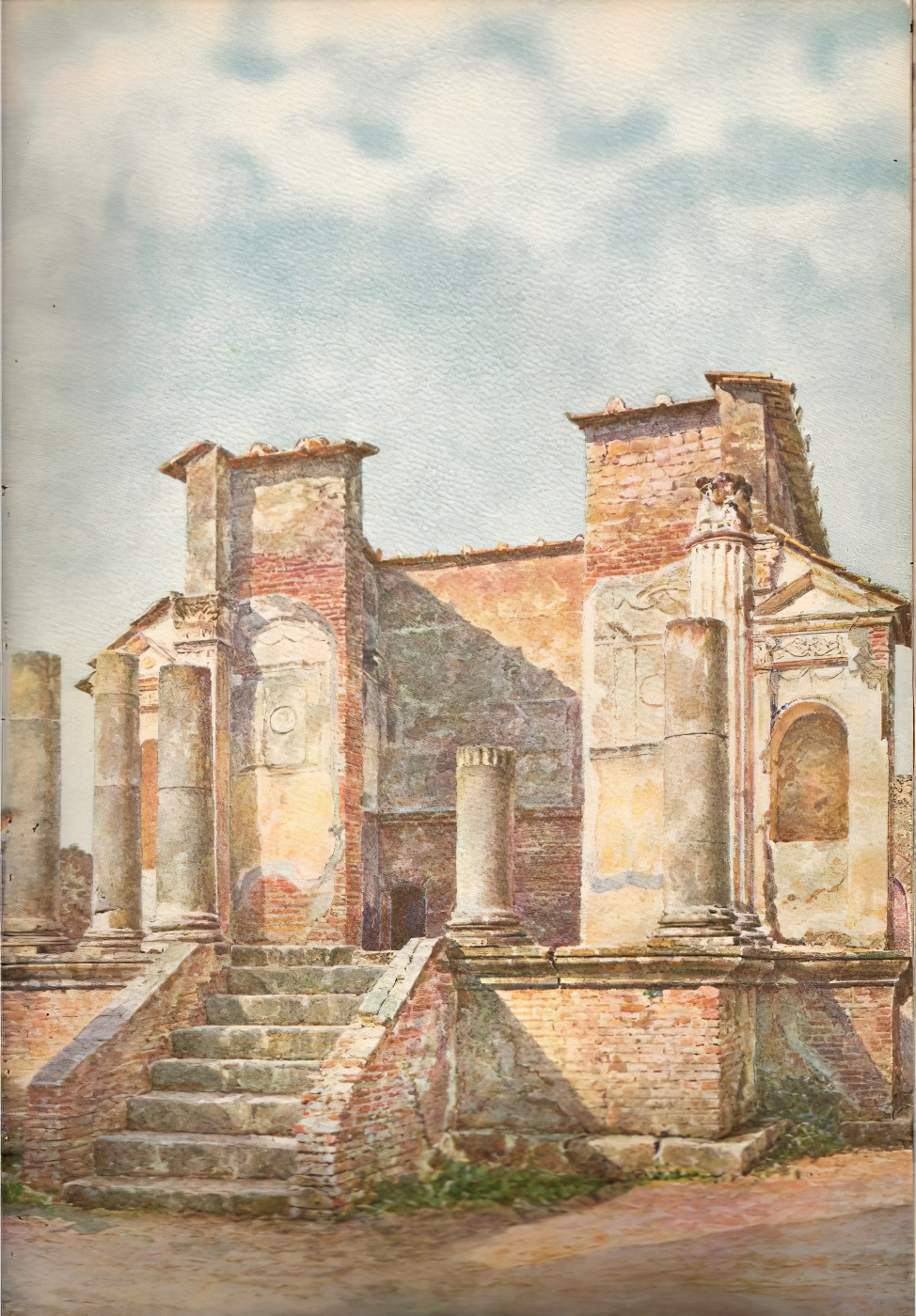
Temple of Isis

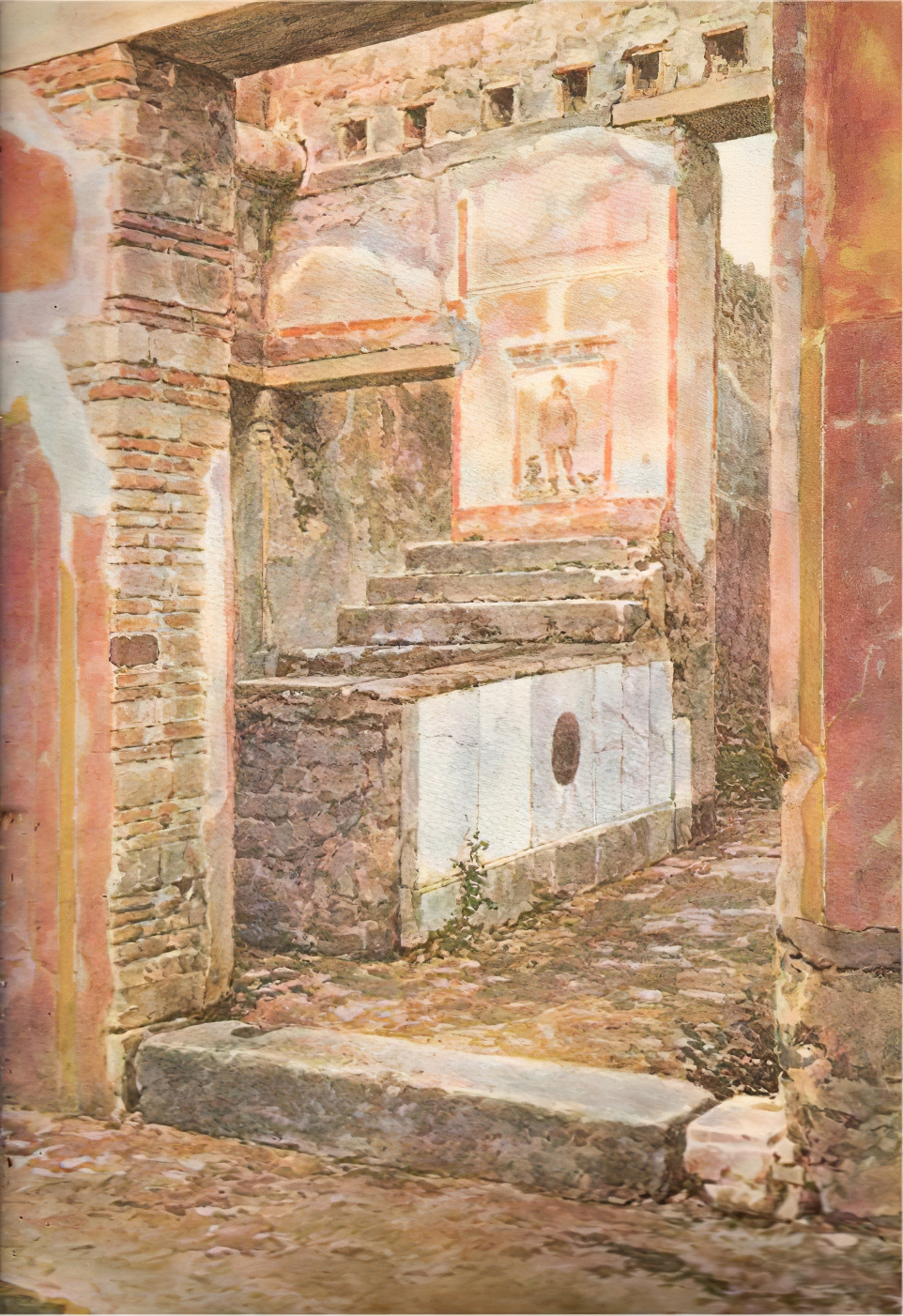
Thermopolion (fast food stall) in the alley of the rooster

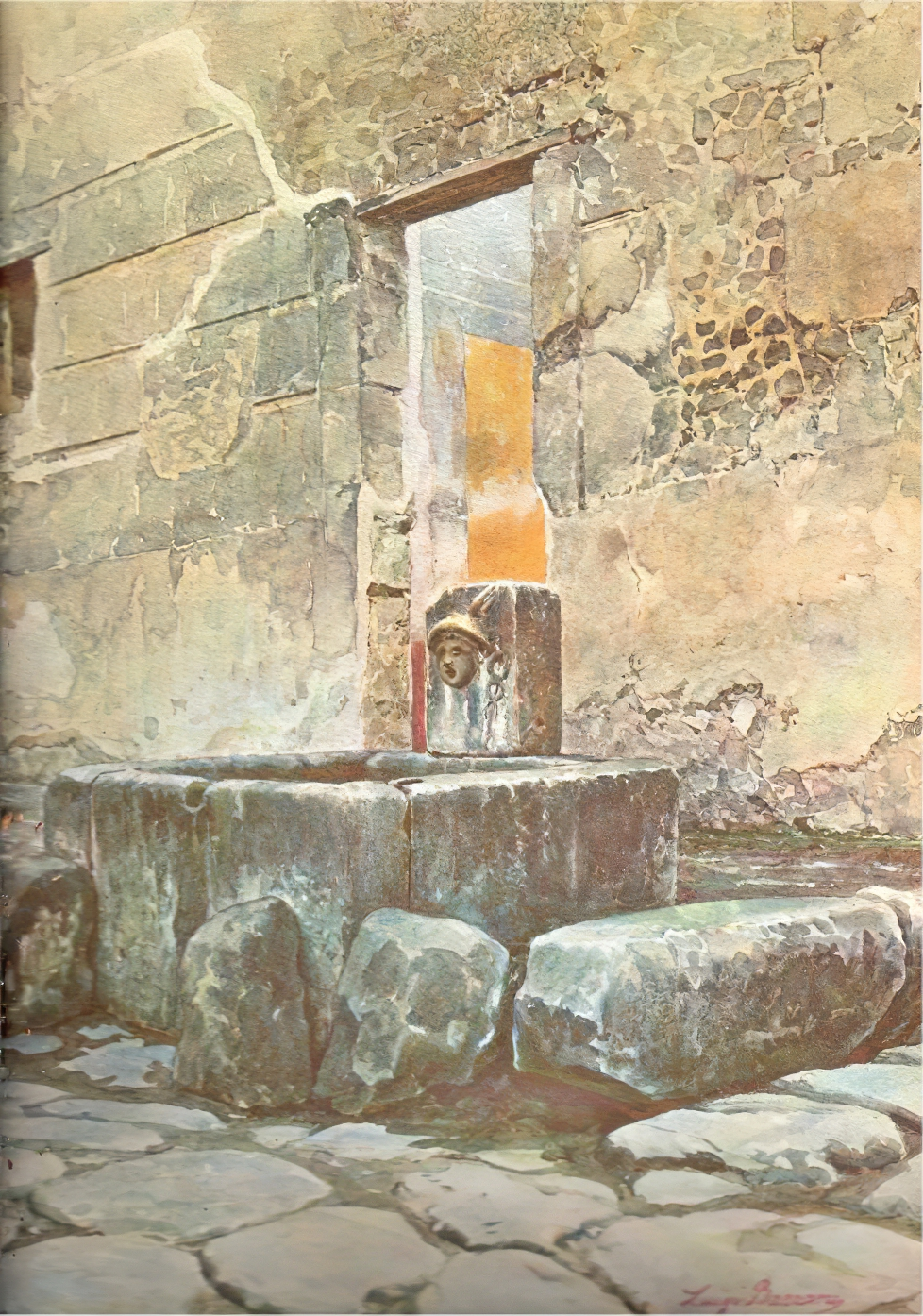
Fountain with head of Mercury on Mercury Street

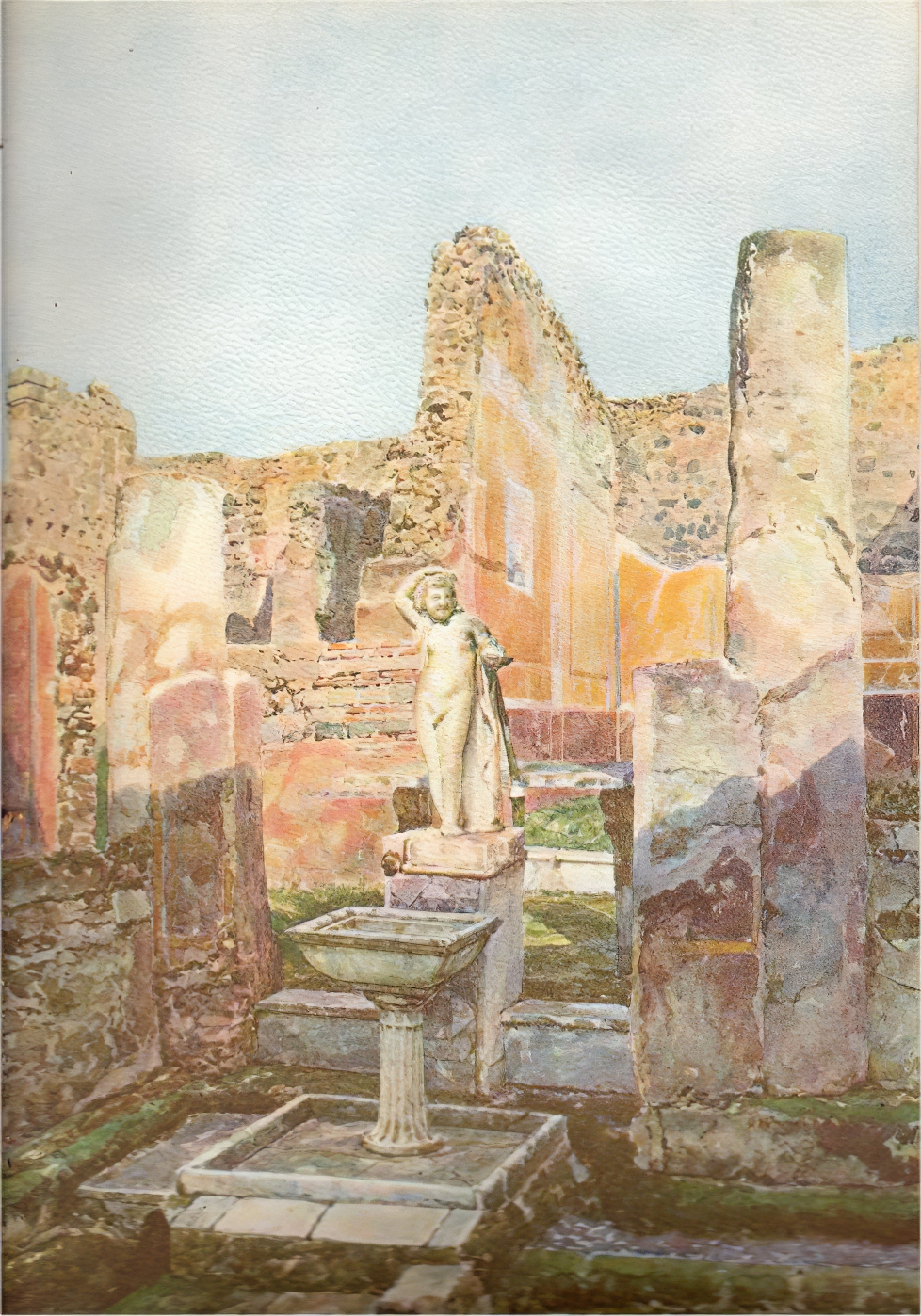
House of the Hanging Balcony

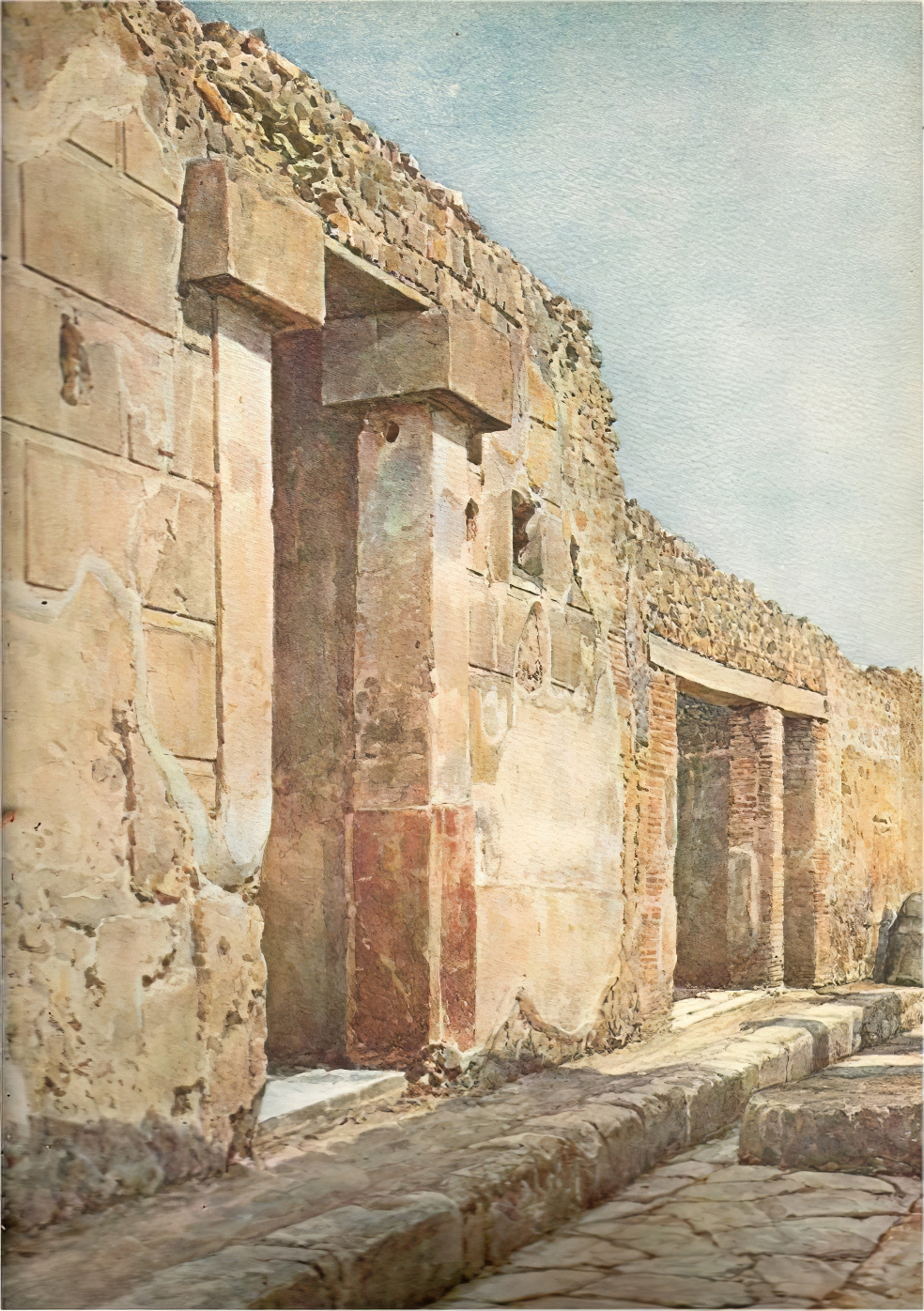
Portal of a patrician house on Augustus Street

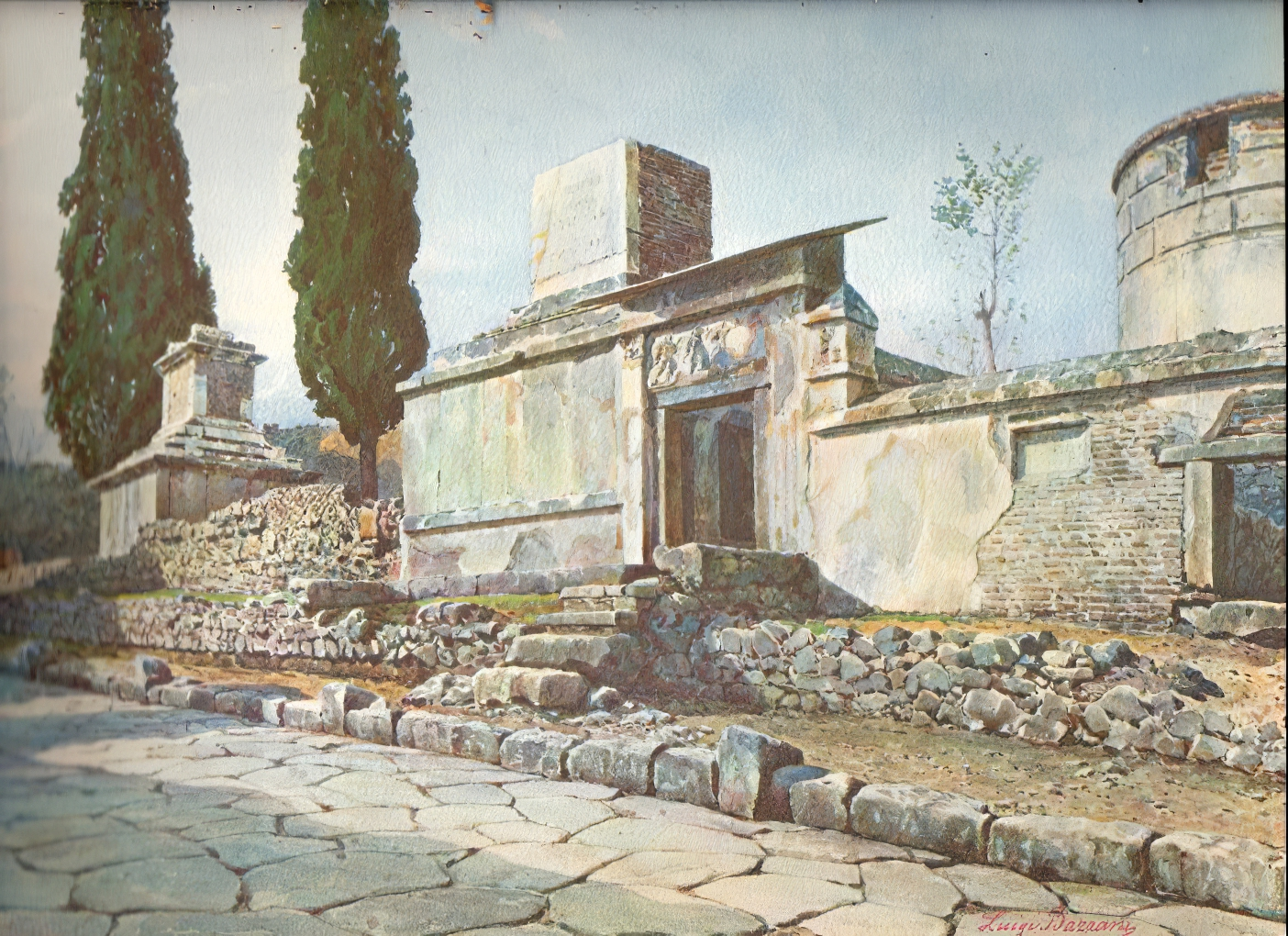
Tomb in the necropolis

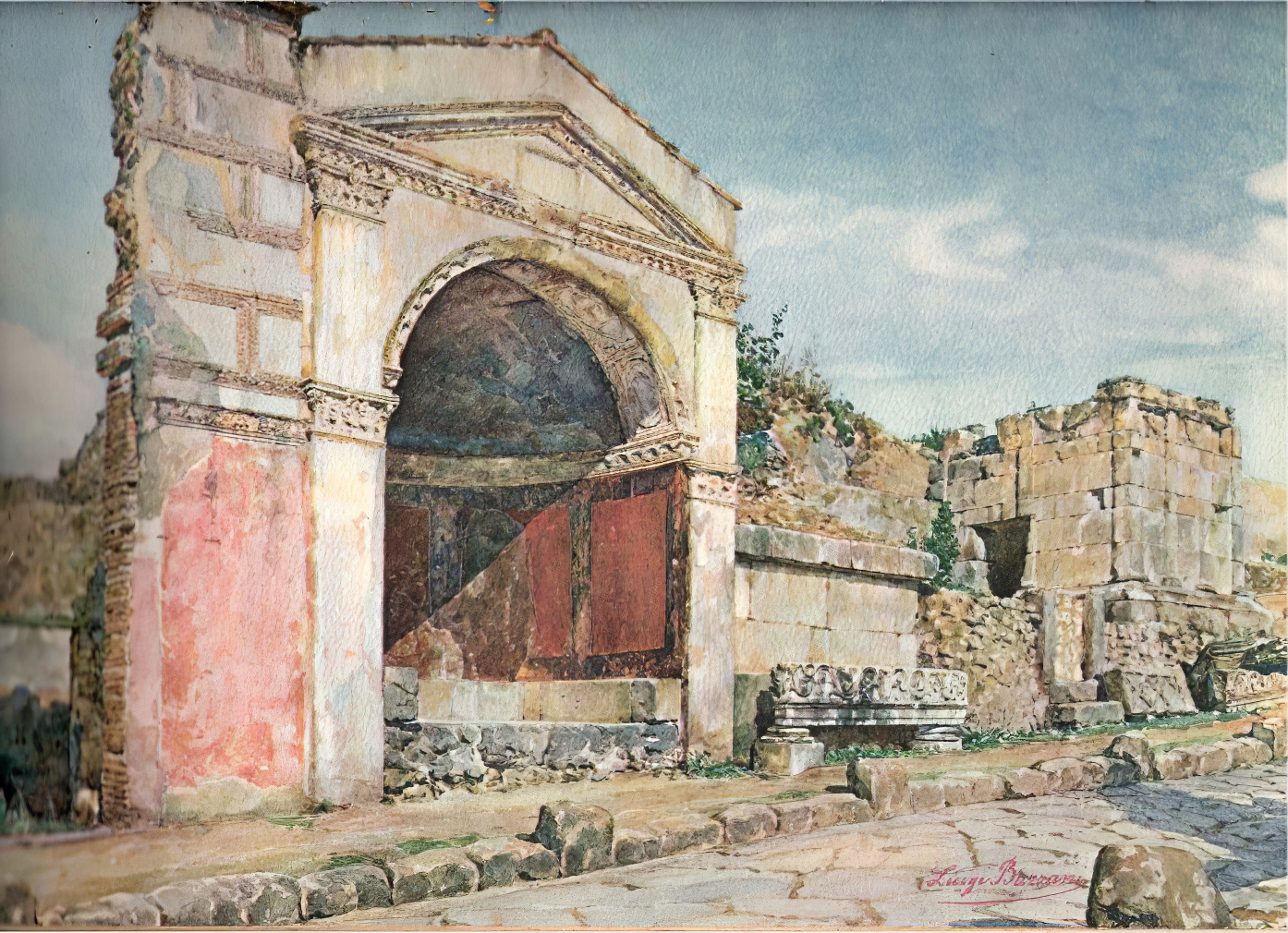
Tomb with covered niche and planter with garland

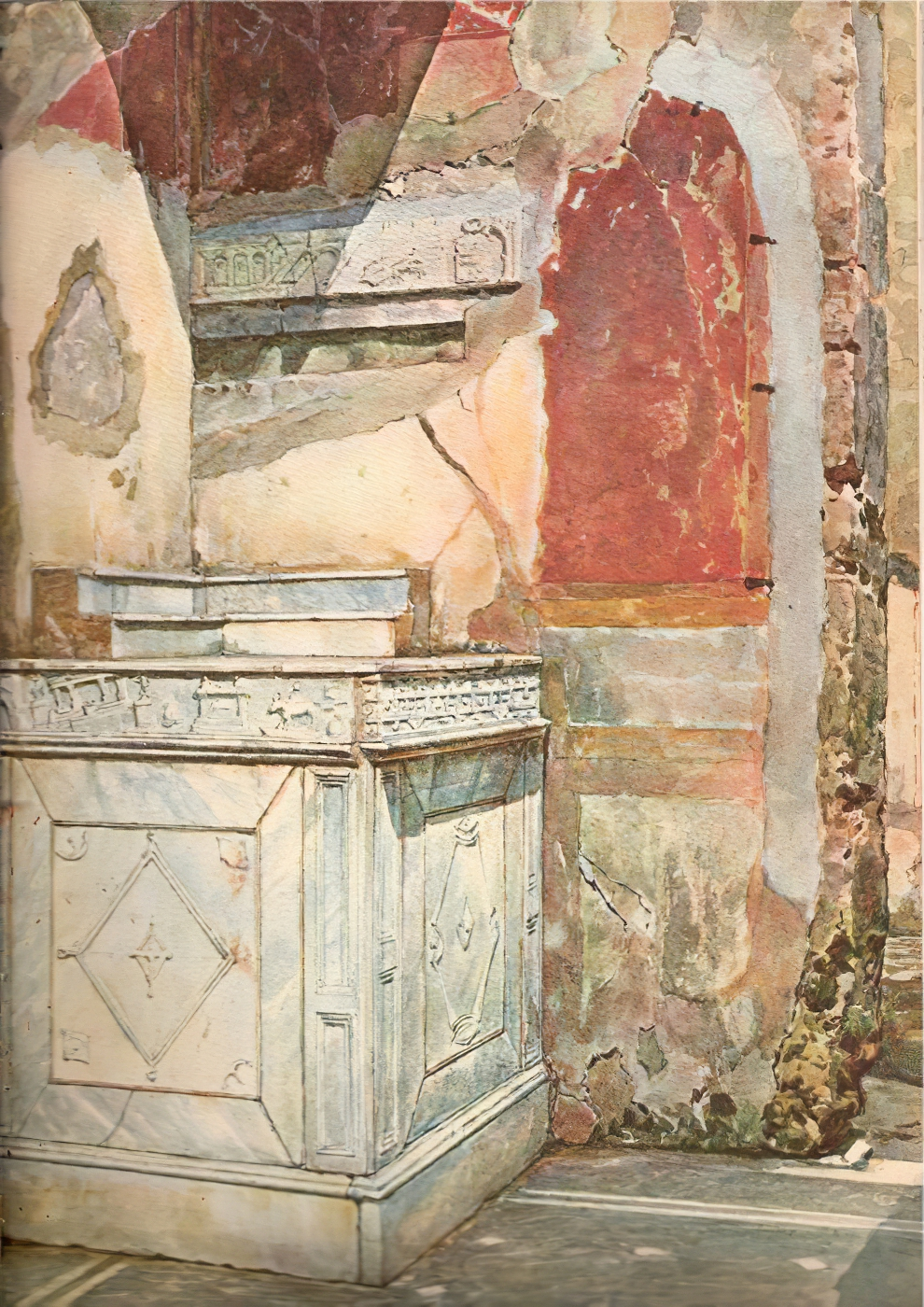
Lararium in the House of L Caecilius Jucundus

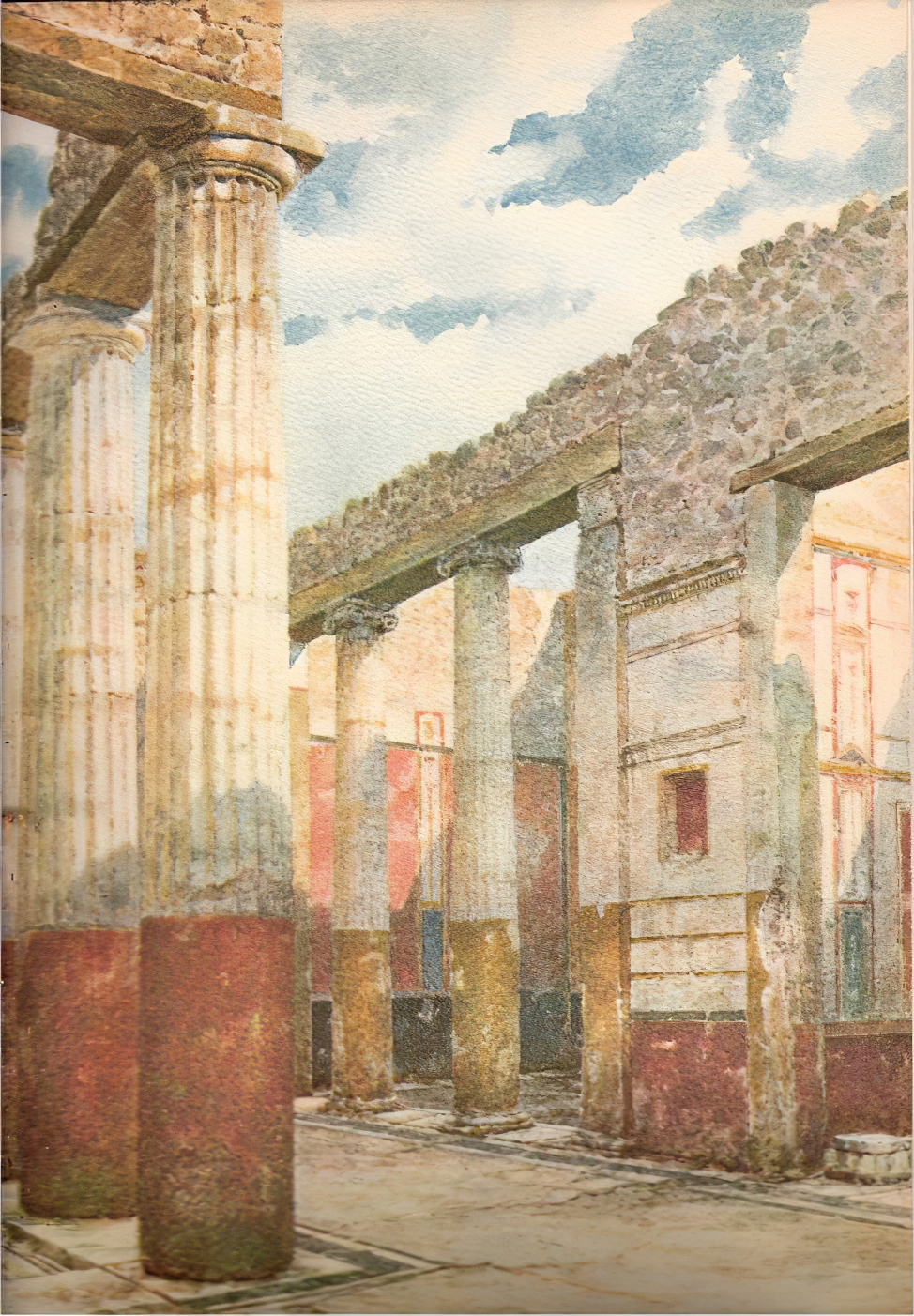
Pompeii Atrium

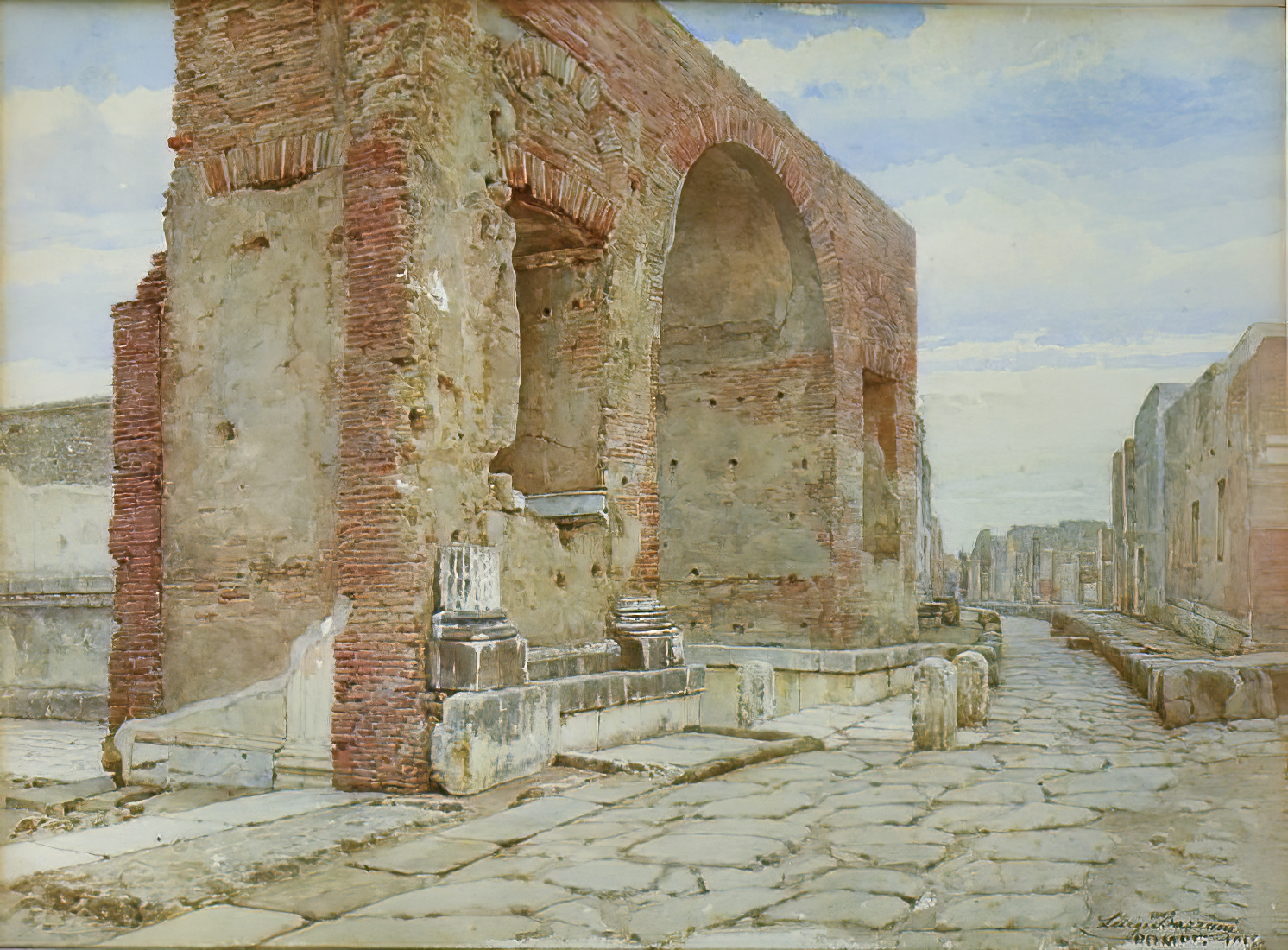
Arches of Nero in the Forum

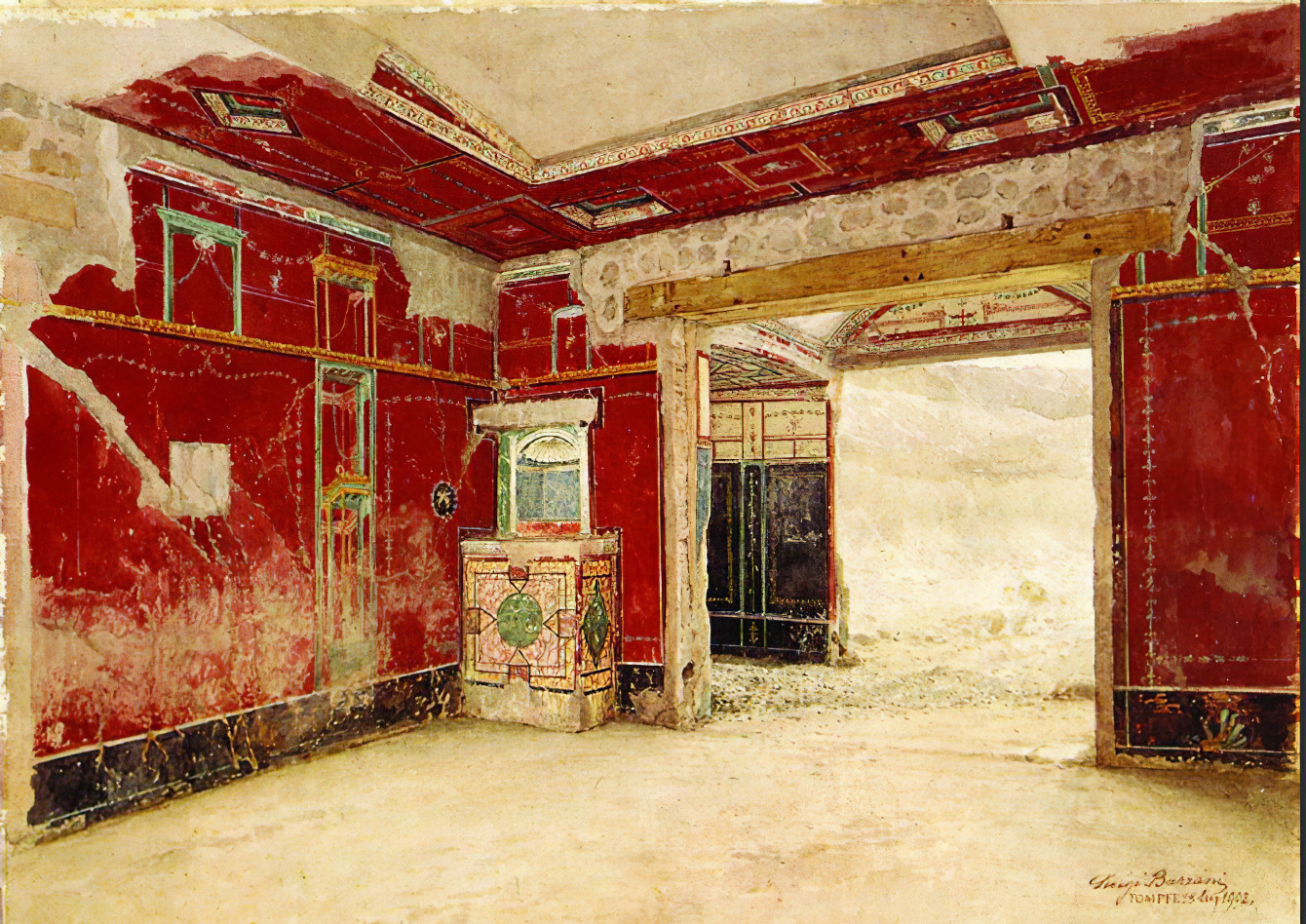
Pompeian red interior

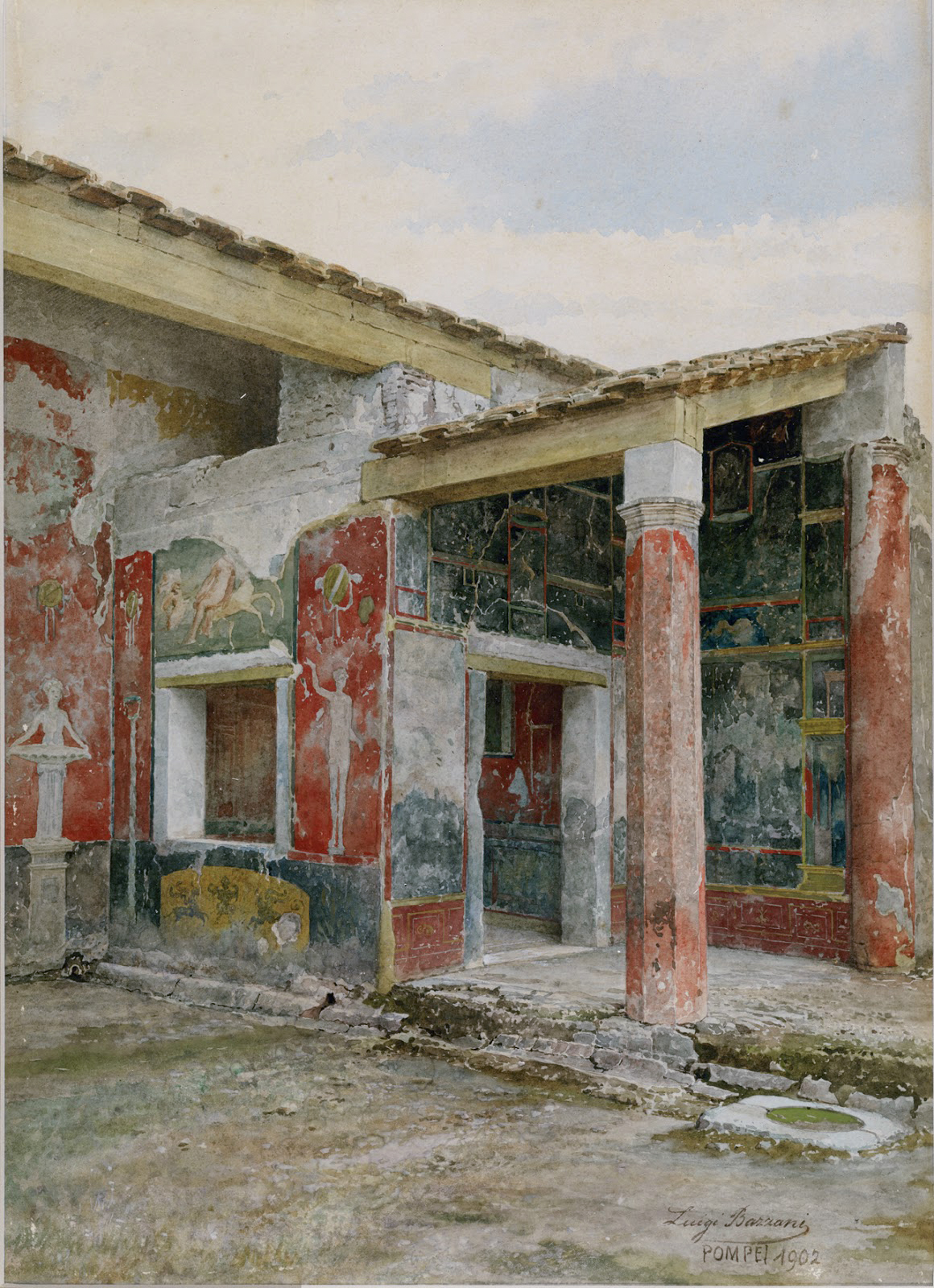
The Genaeceum (Women's Quarters) of the House of Sallust (VI 2, 4)

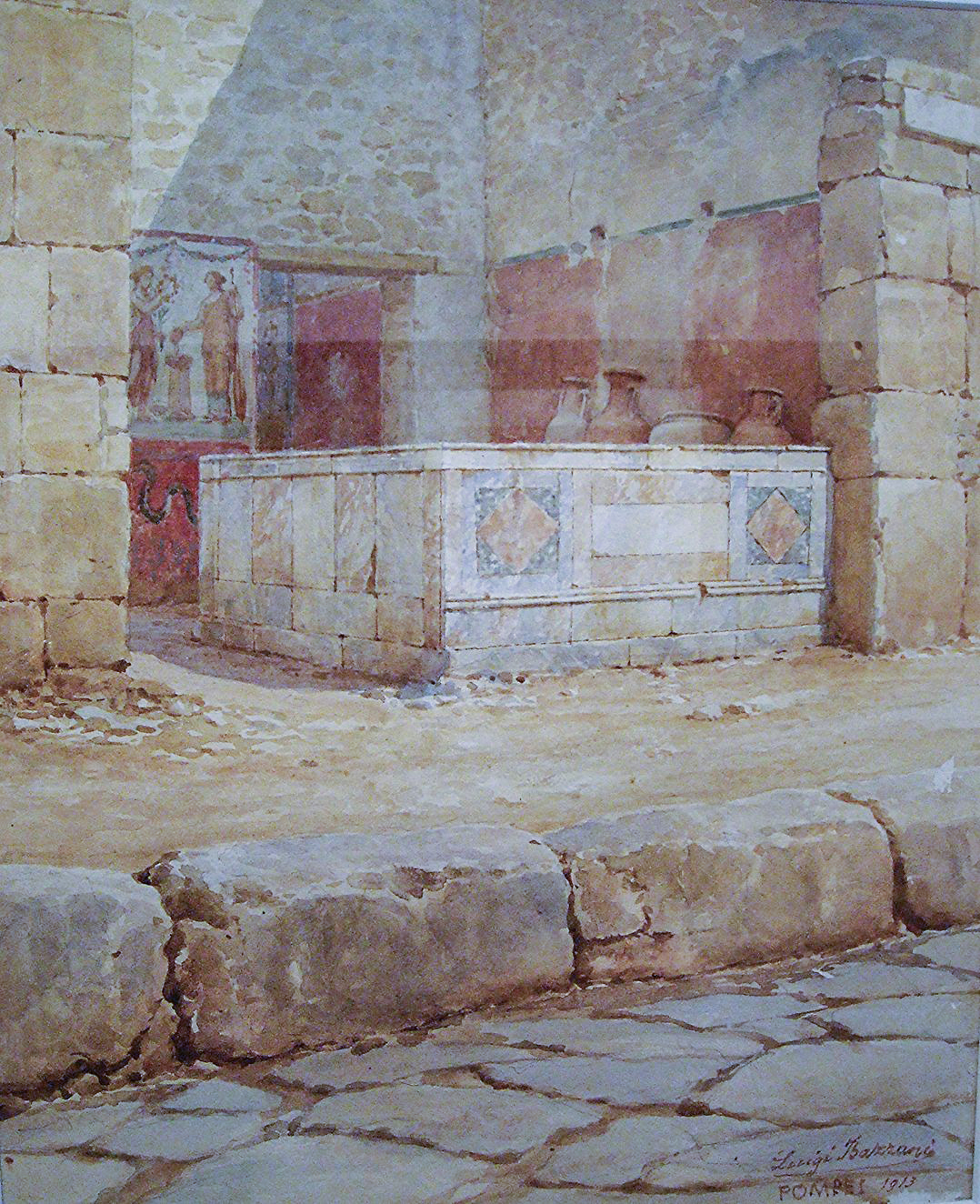
Thermopolium in the Alley of the Pharmacist

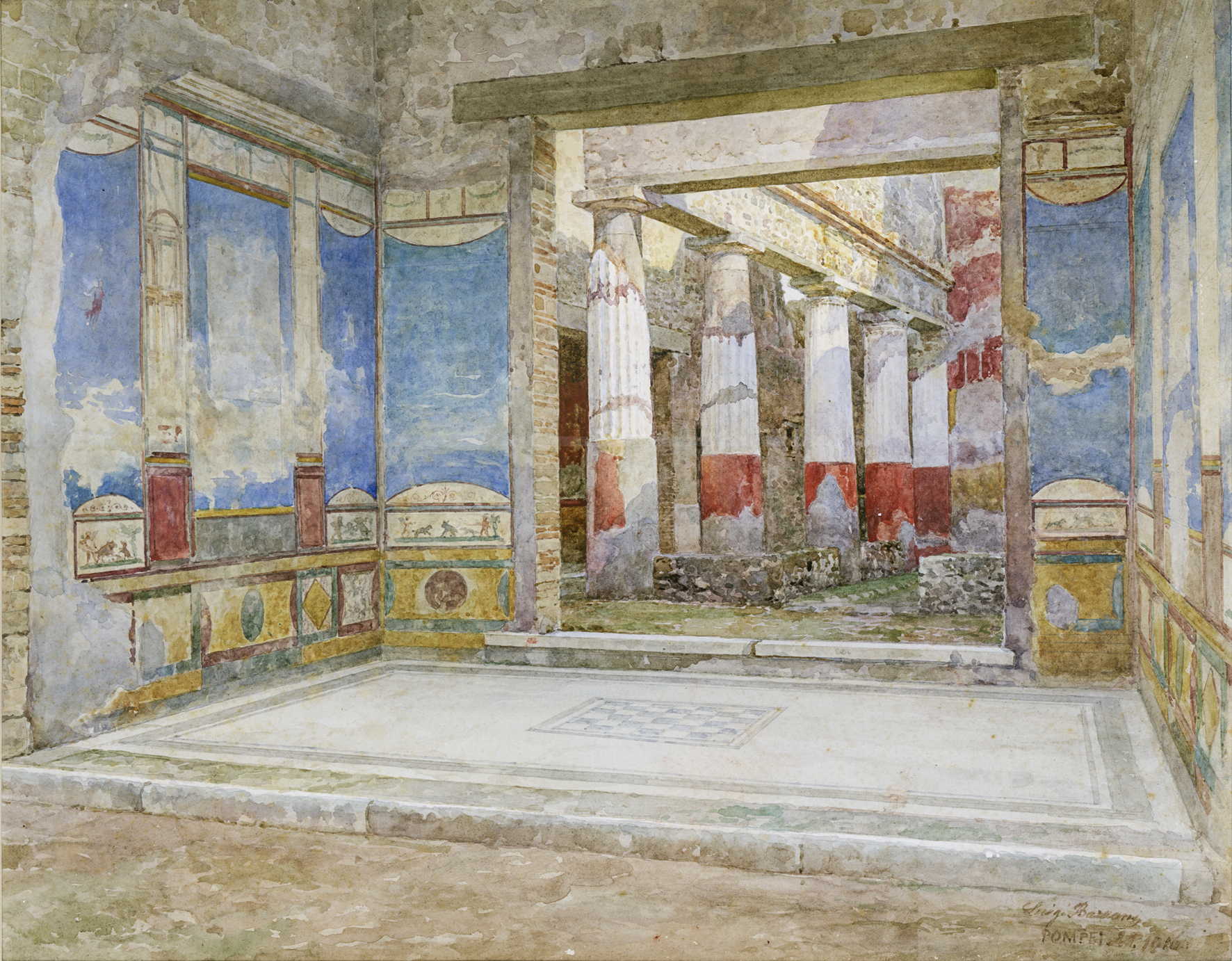
Atrium of the House of the Ancient Hunt

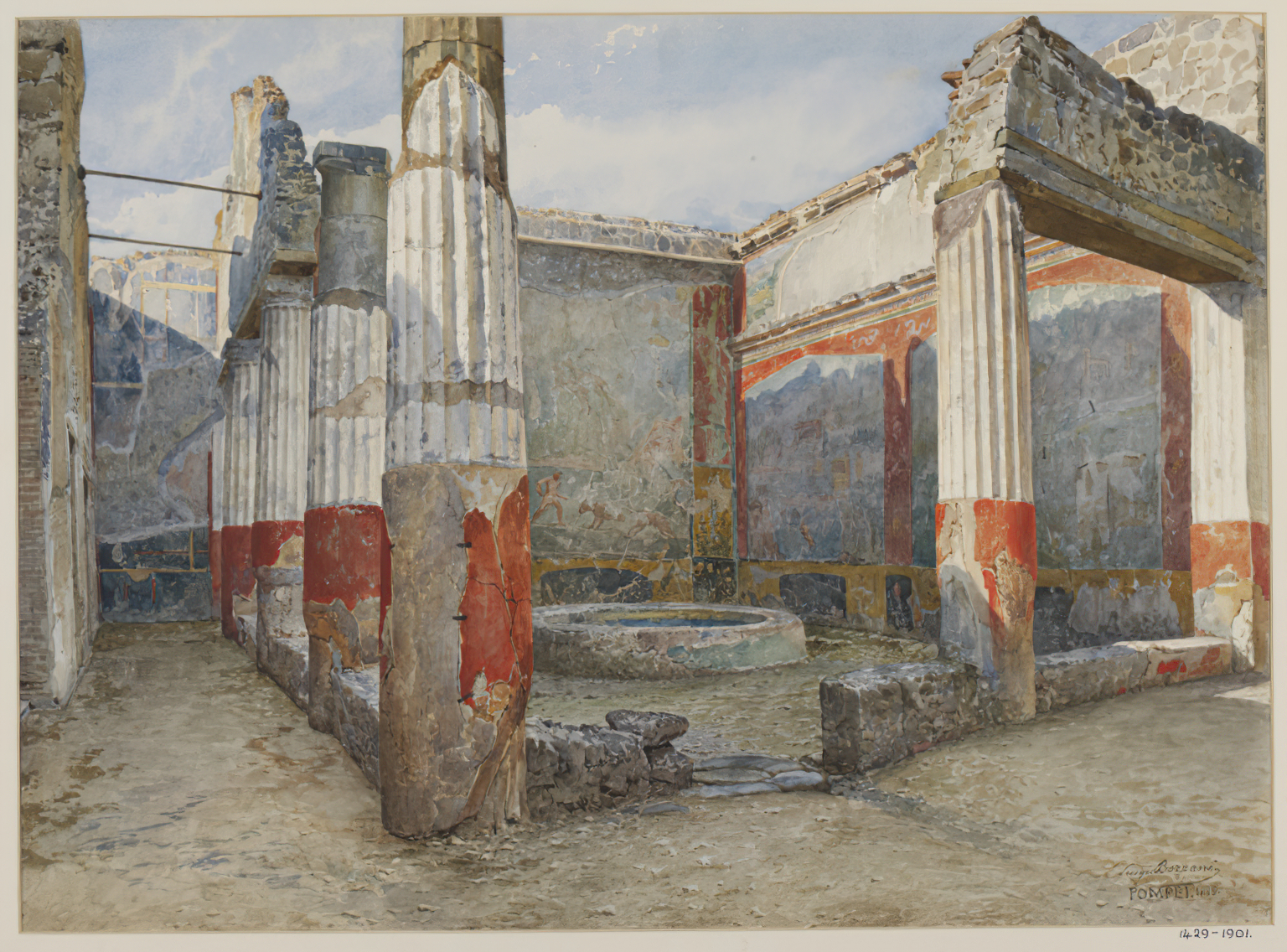
Atrium of the House of the Ancient Hunt in Pompeii

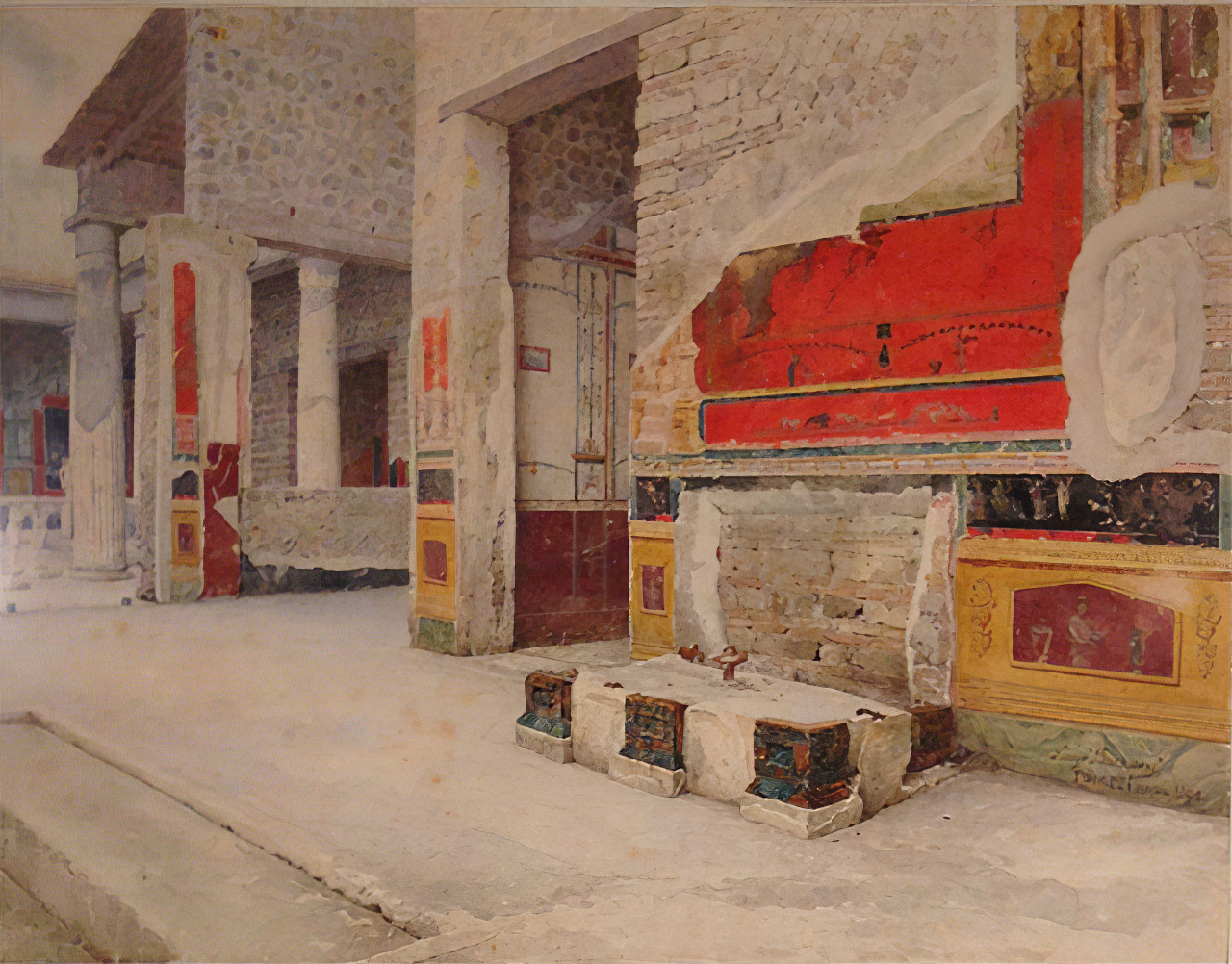
Atrium of the House of the Vetti VI.15.1

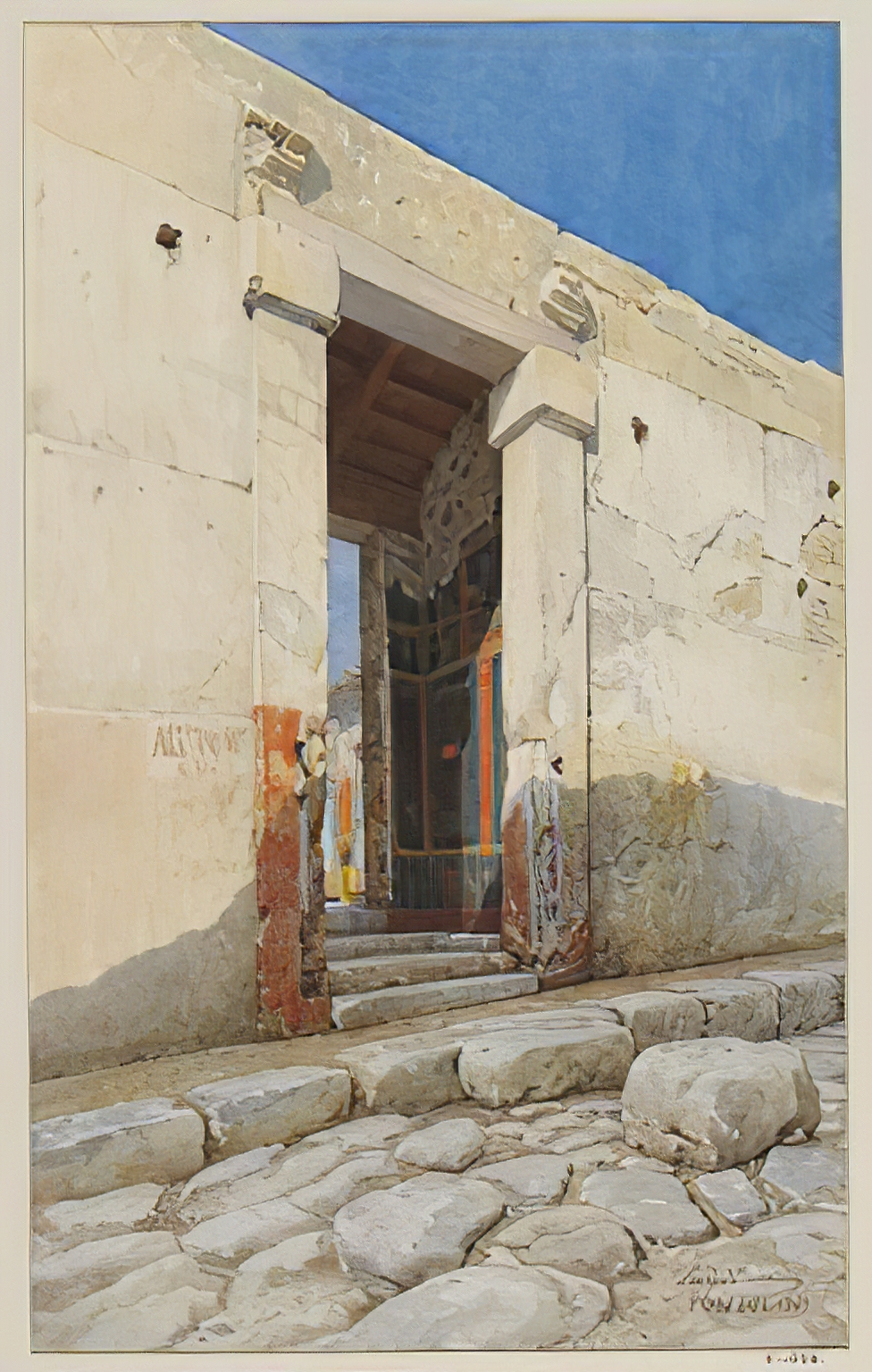
Entry to a Roman domus

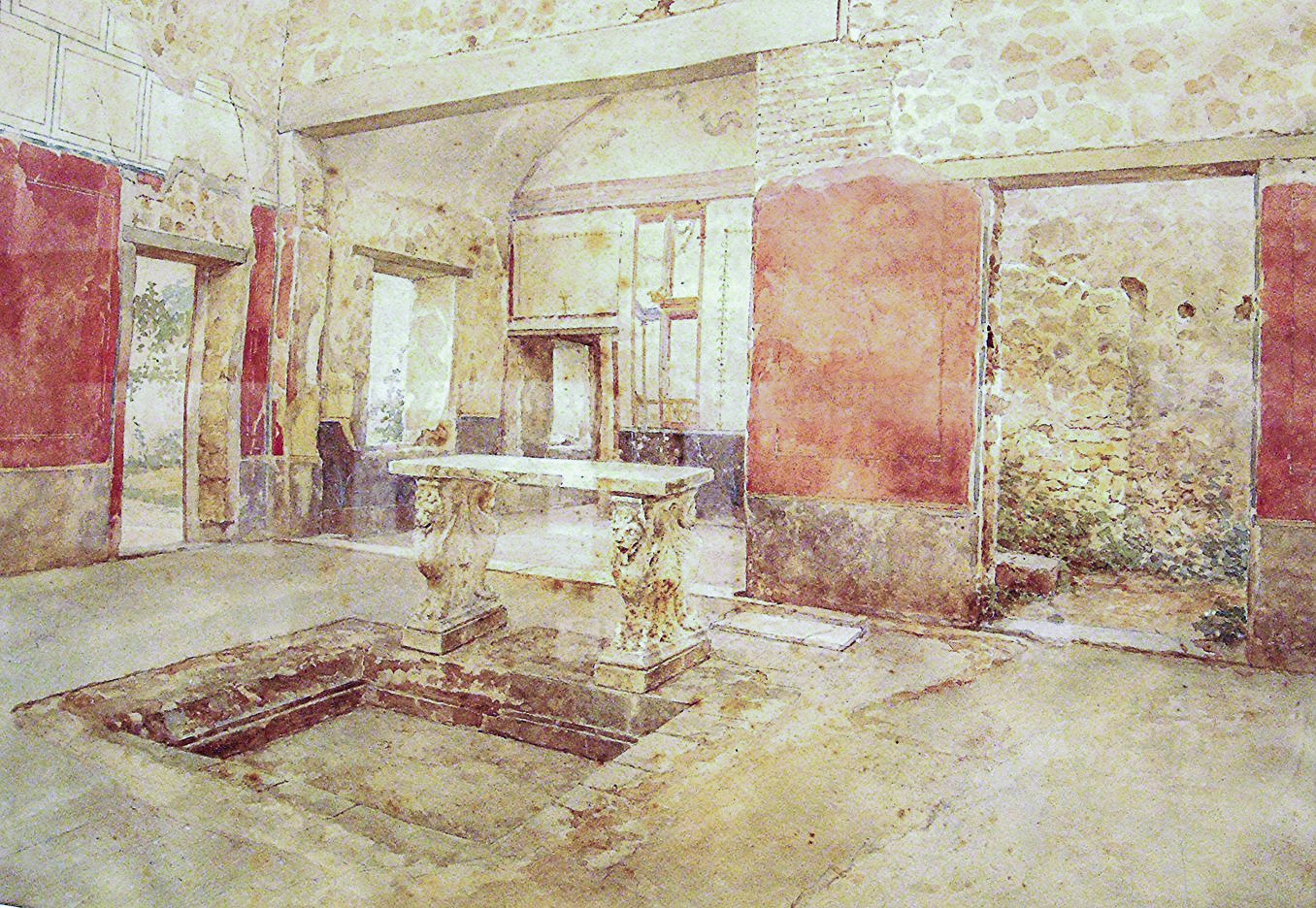
Atrium of the House of the Prince of Naples

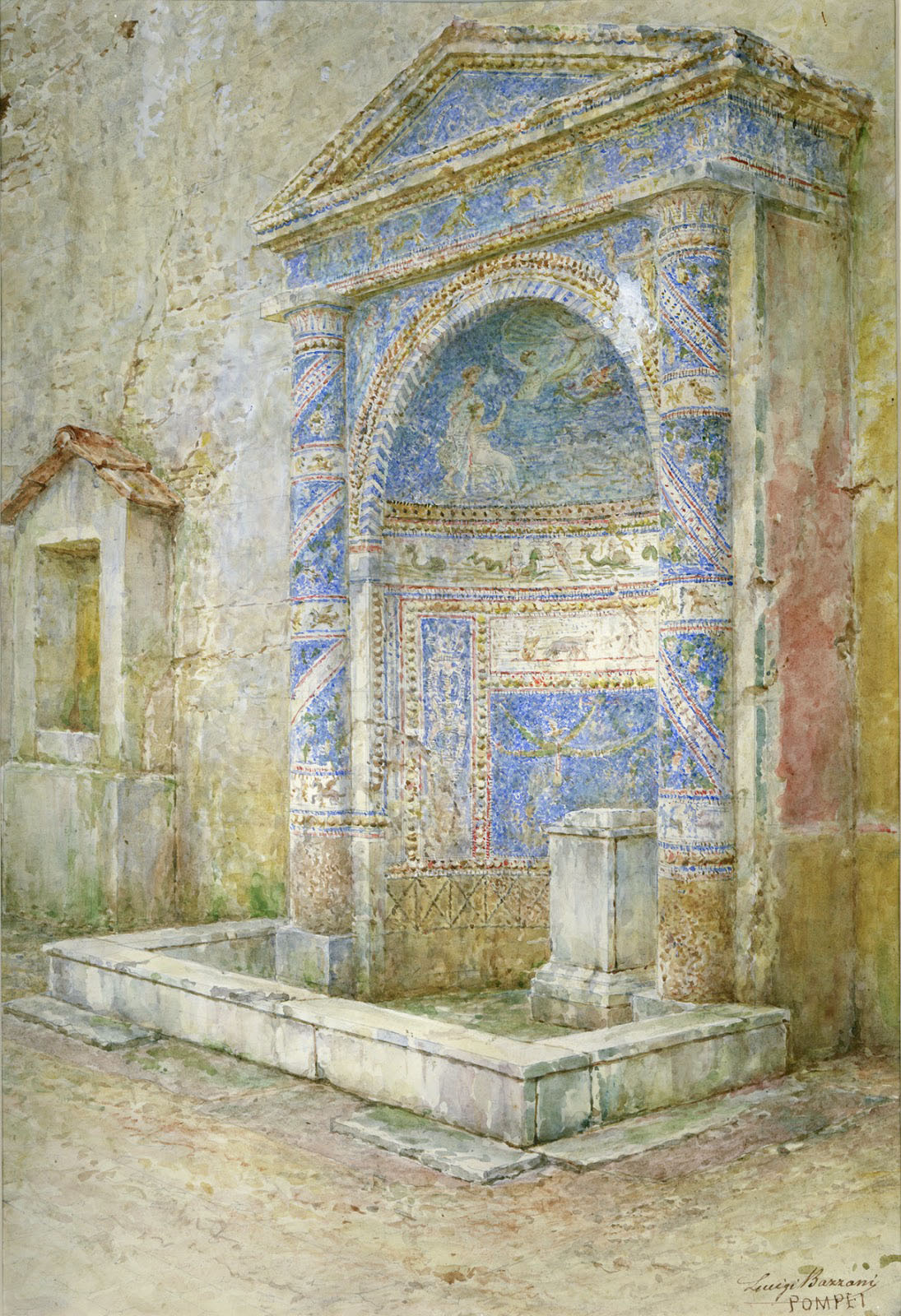
Fountain of the House of the Arches (IX 7, 20)

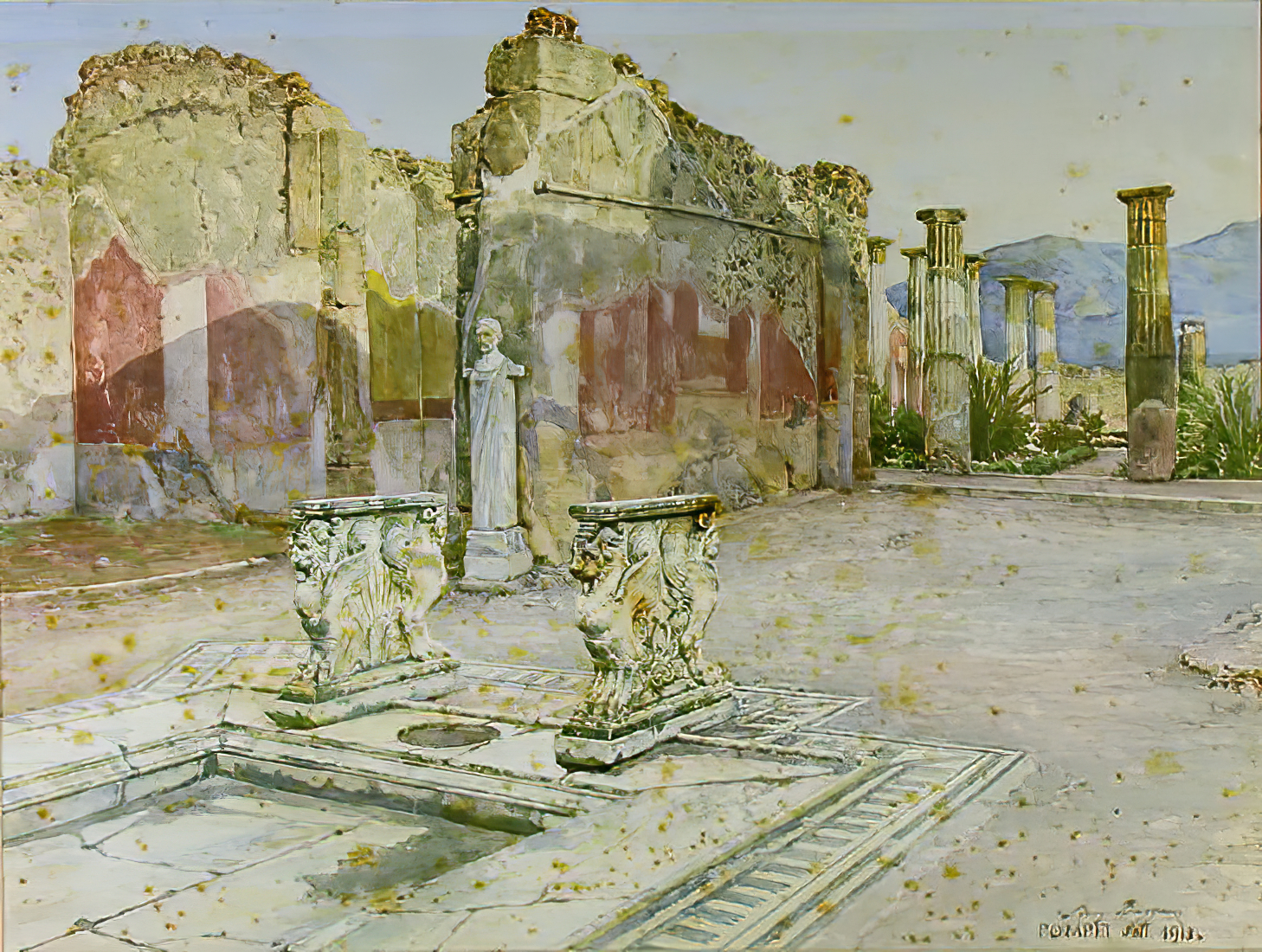
Atrium of the House of Cornelius Rufus

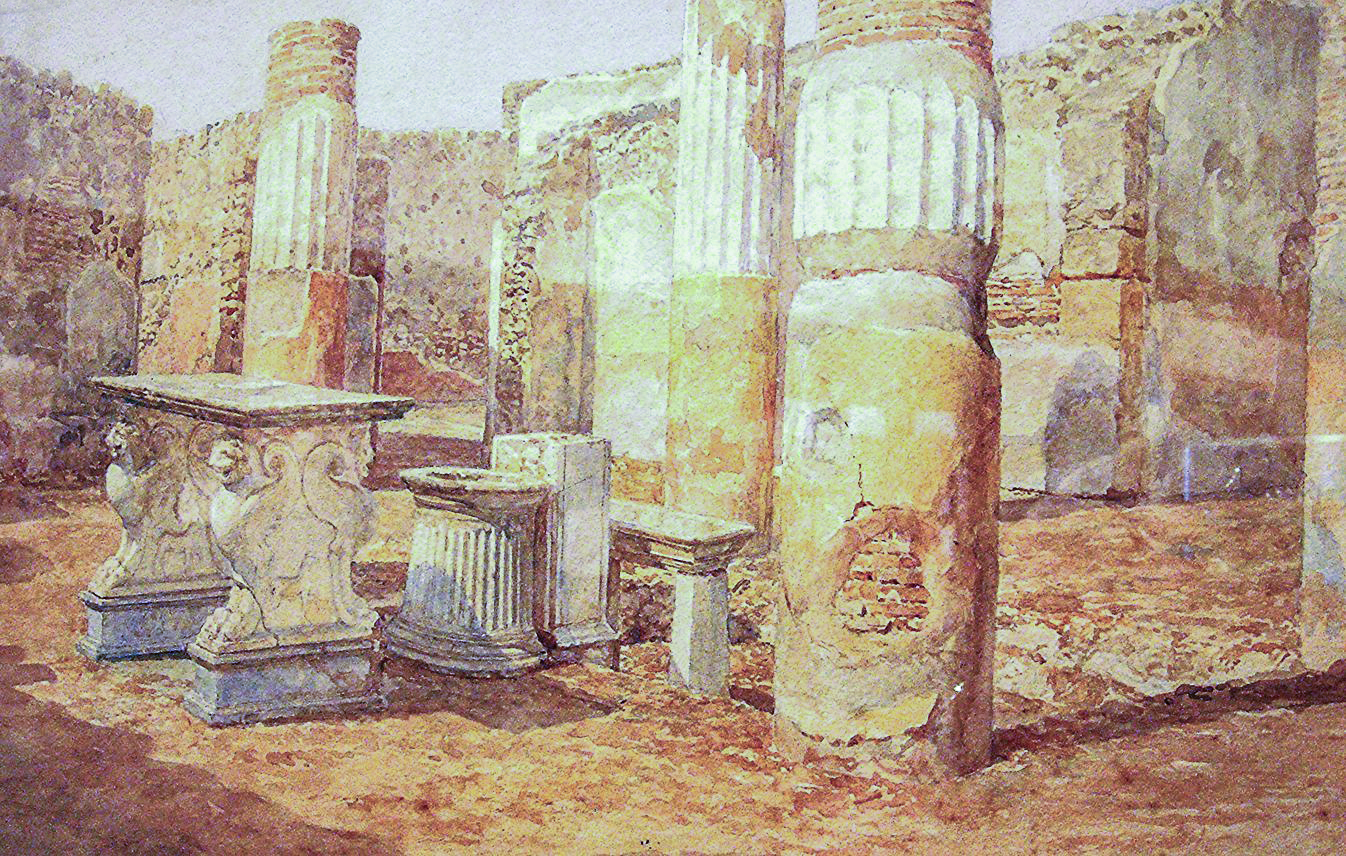
Colonnade of the House of Cornelius Rufus

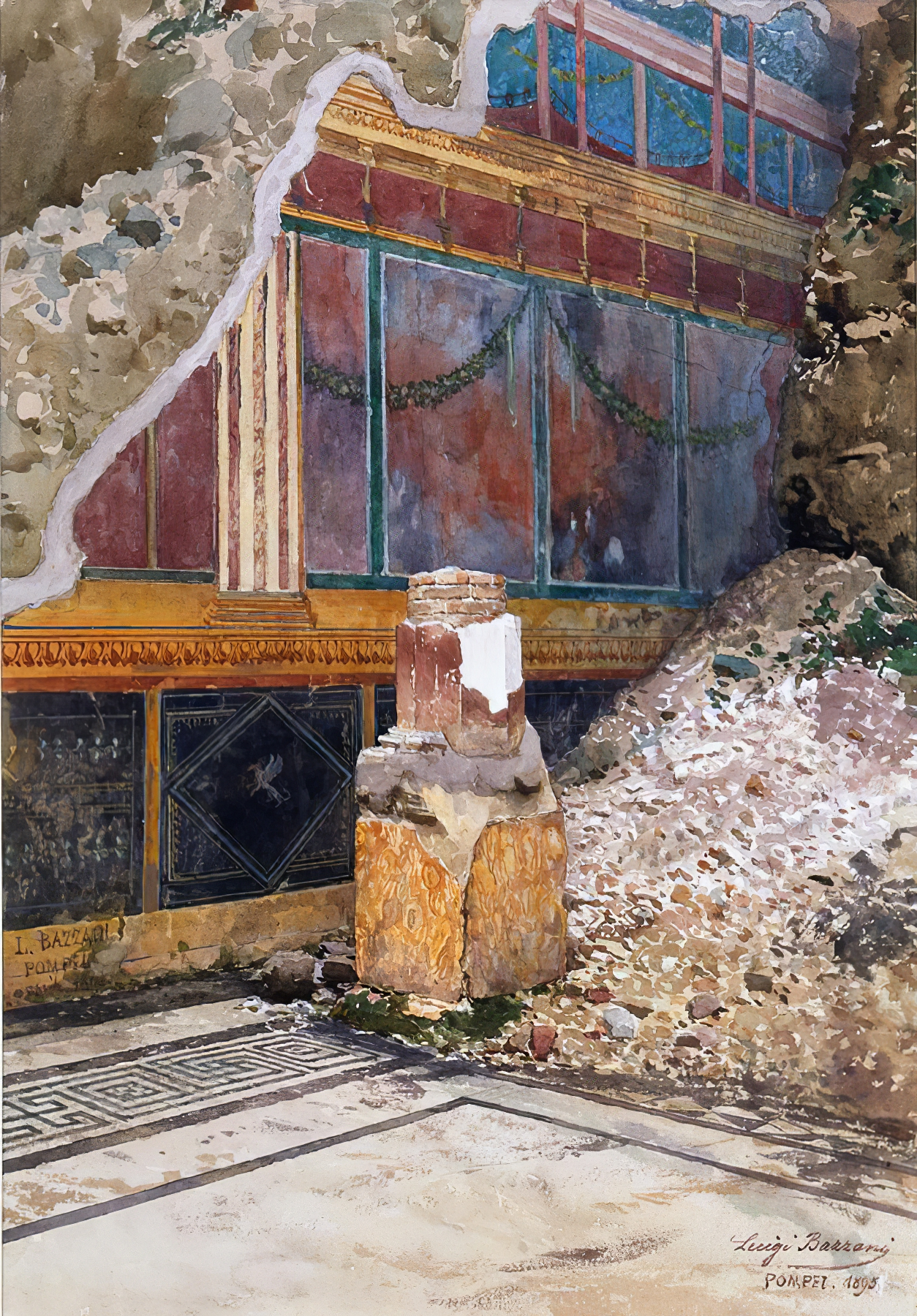
House of the Silver Wedding

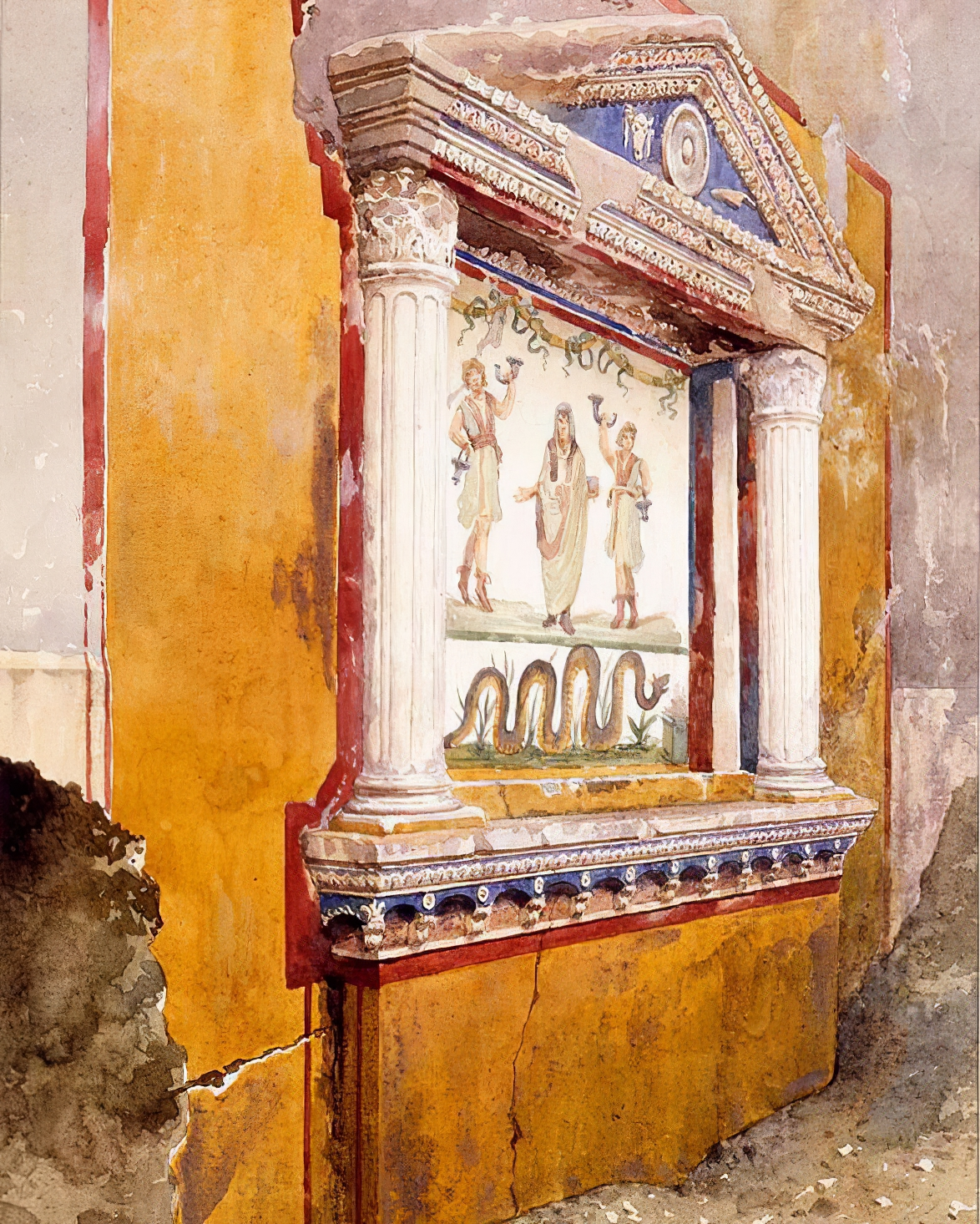
Lararium of a family altar, seen in situ after excavation, House of Aulus Vettius, Pompeii, c36-39 CE, 1895

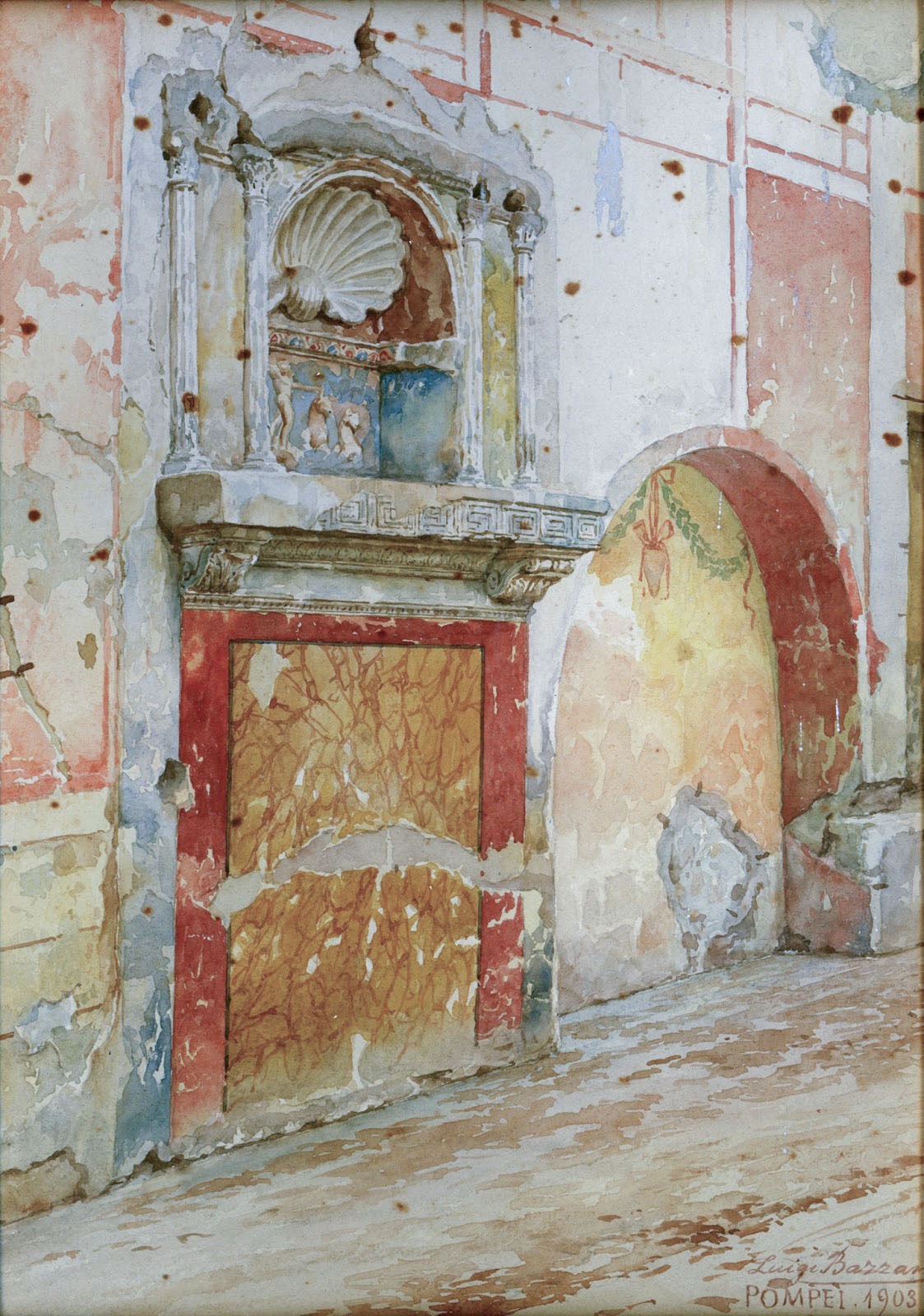
Lararium of the House of Paccius Alexander (IX 1, 7)

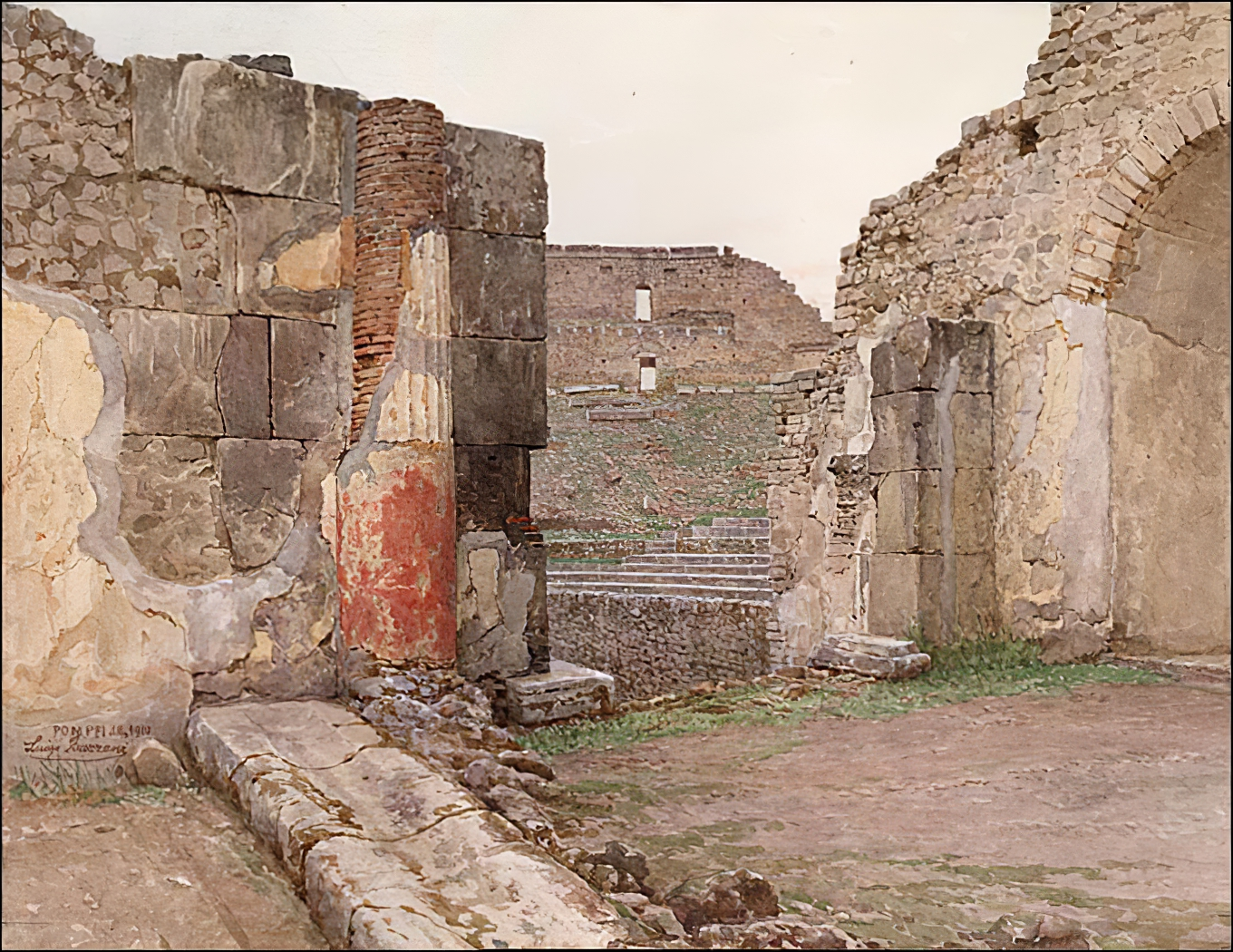
Large theater in Pompeii, 1910,

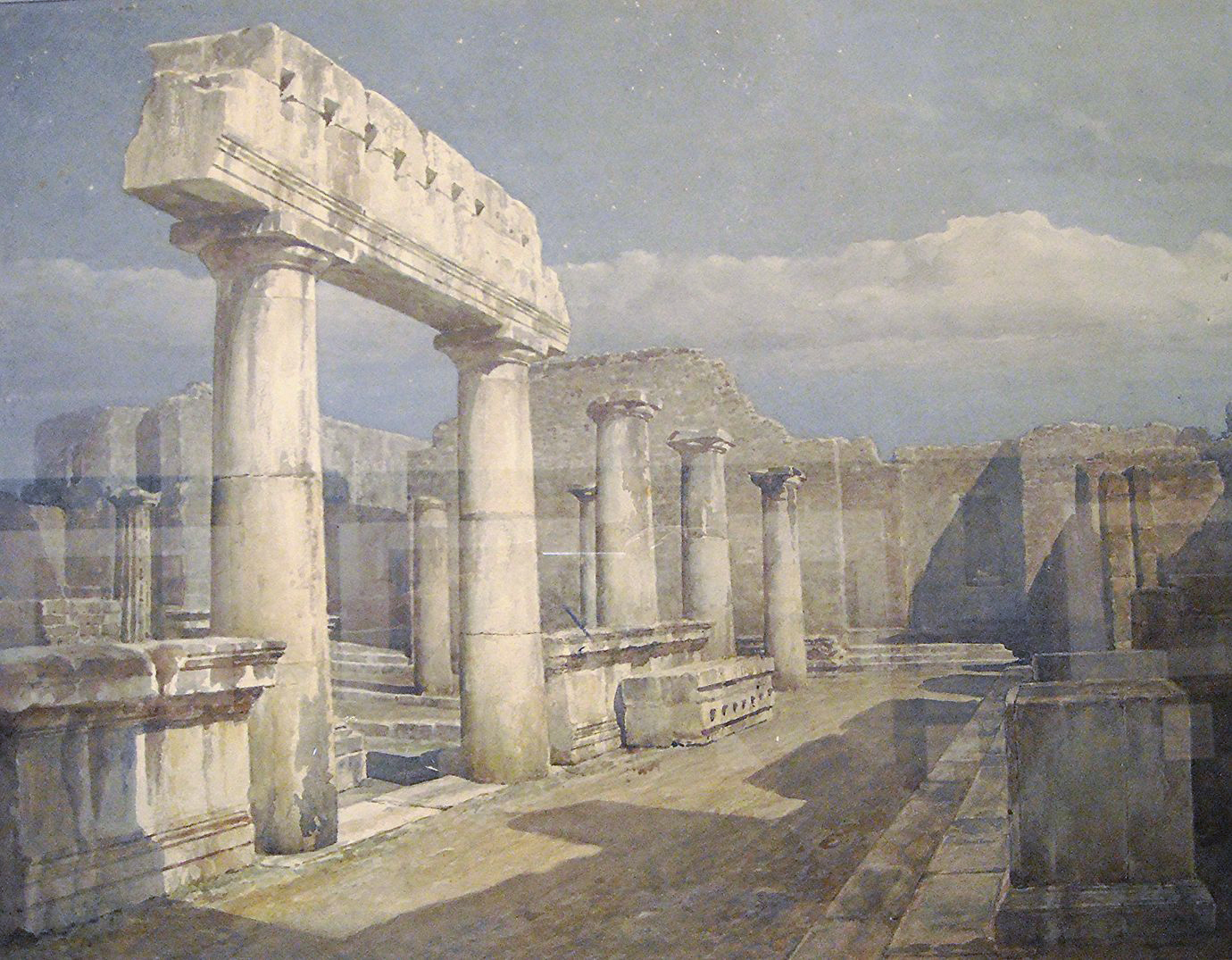
Pompeii forum

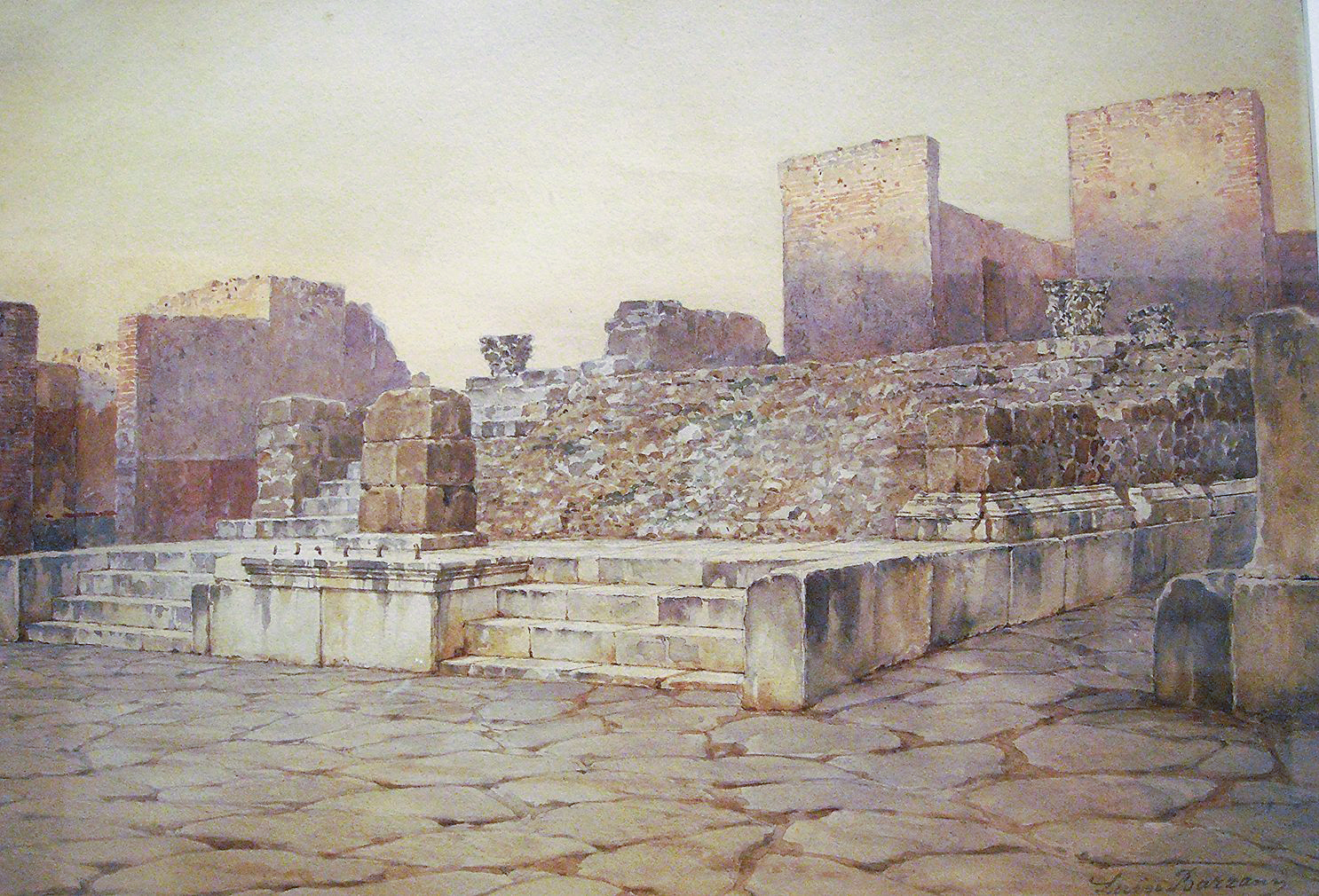
The Temple of Fortuna Augusta

=== Rome's monuments ===
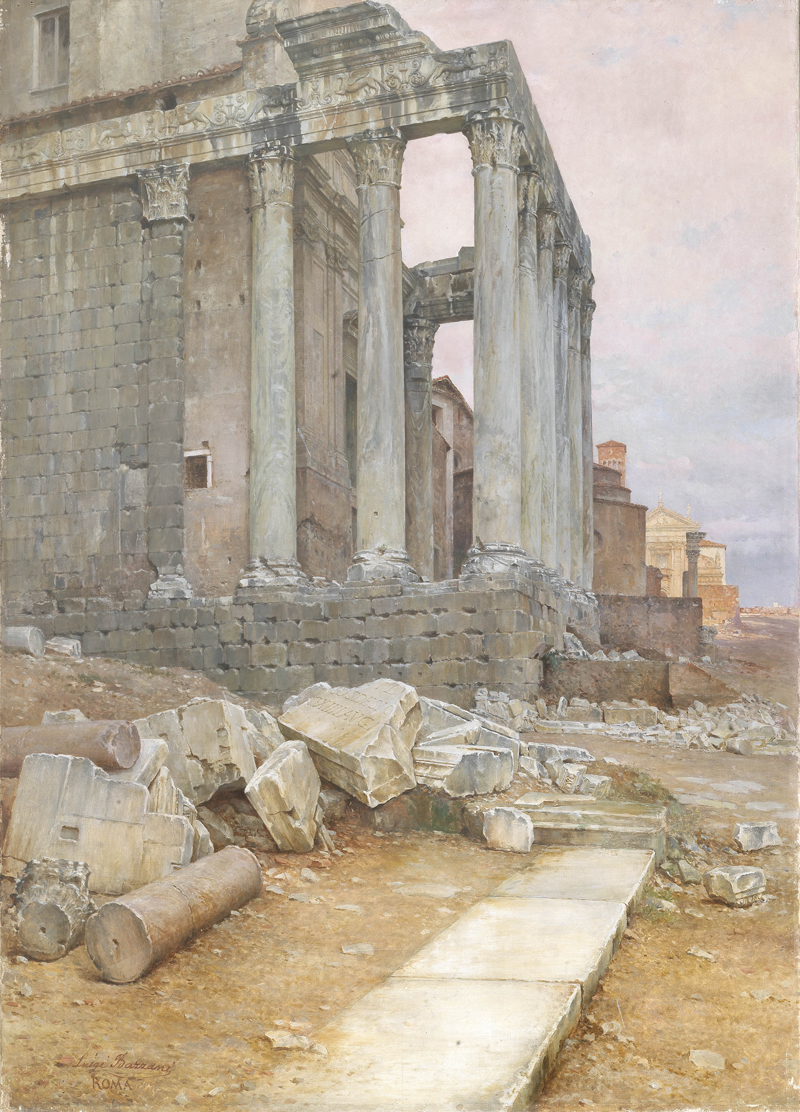
Temple of Antonino and Faustina, Rome

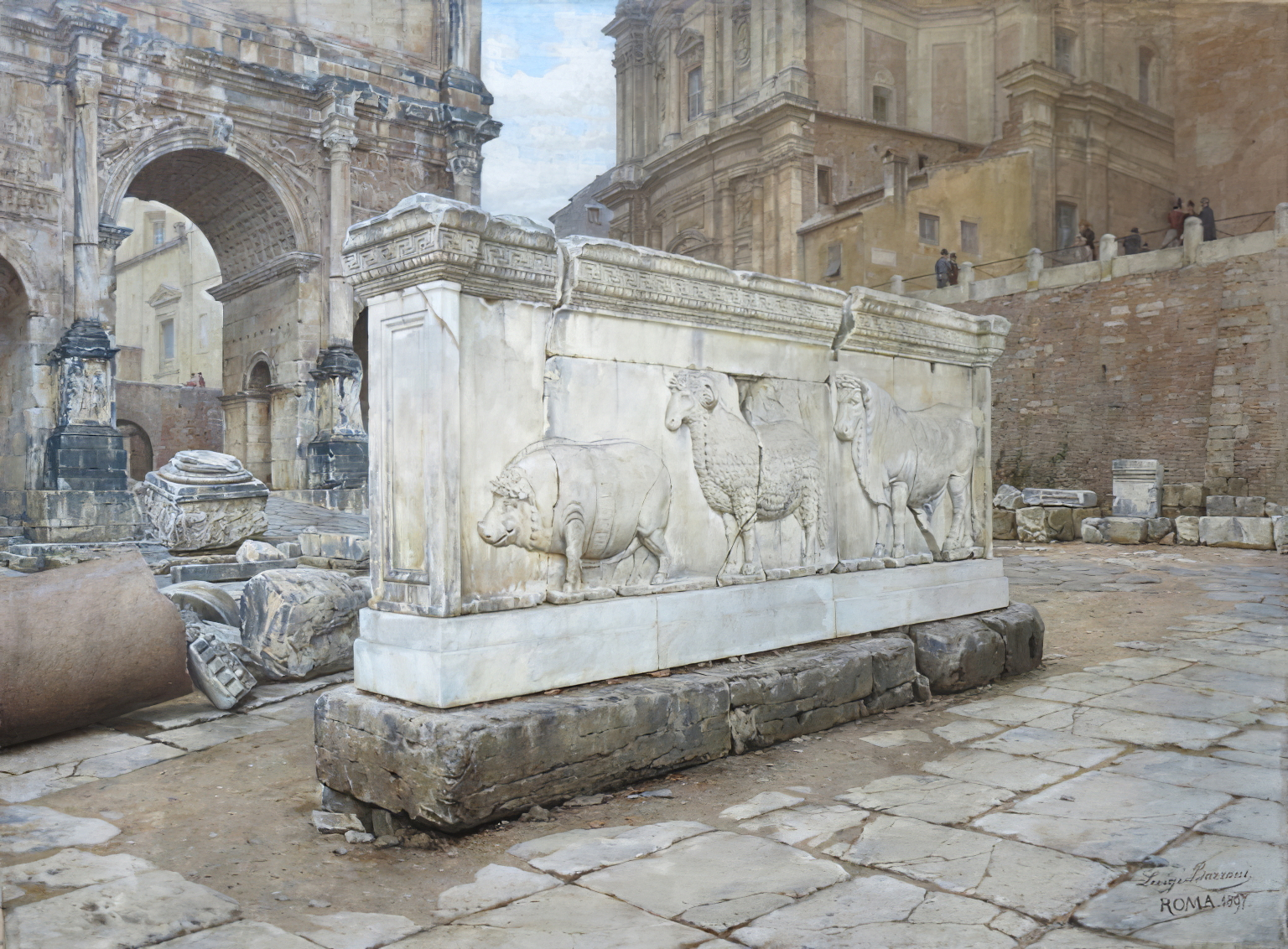
Anaglyph of Trajan in the Roman Forum, 1897

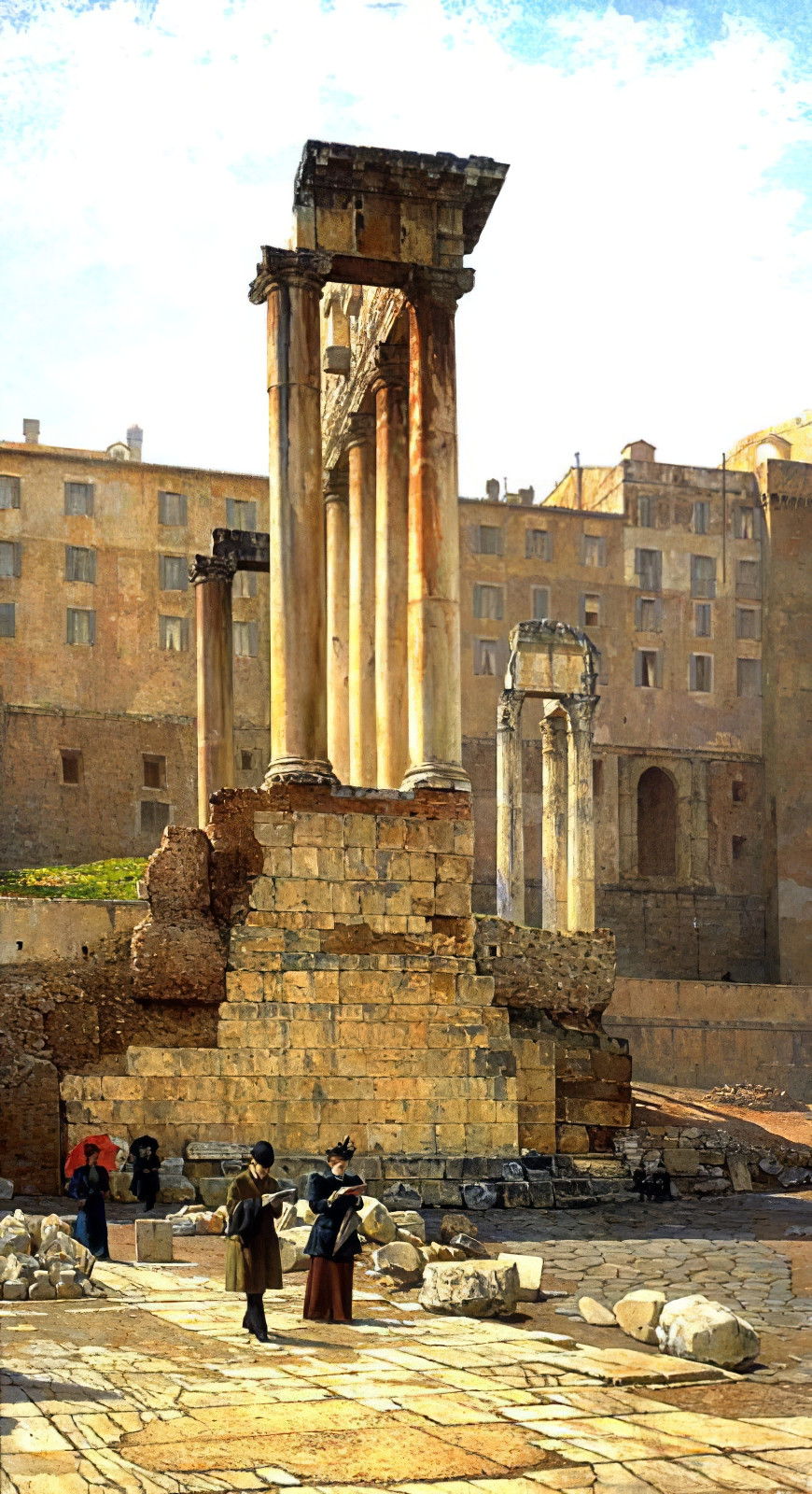
Temple of Saturn by Luigi Bazzani, 1894

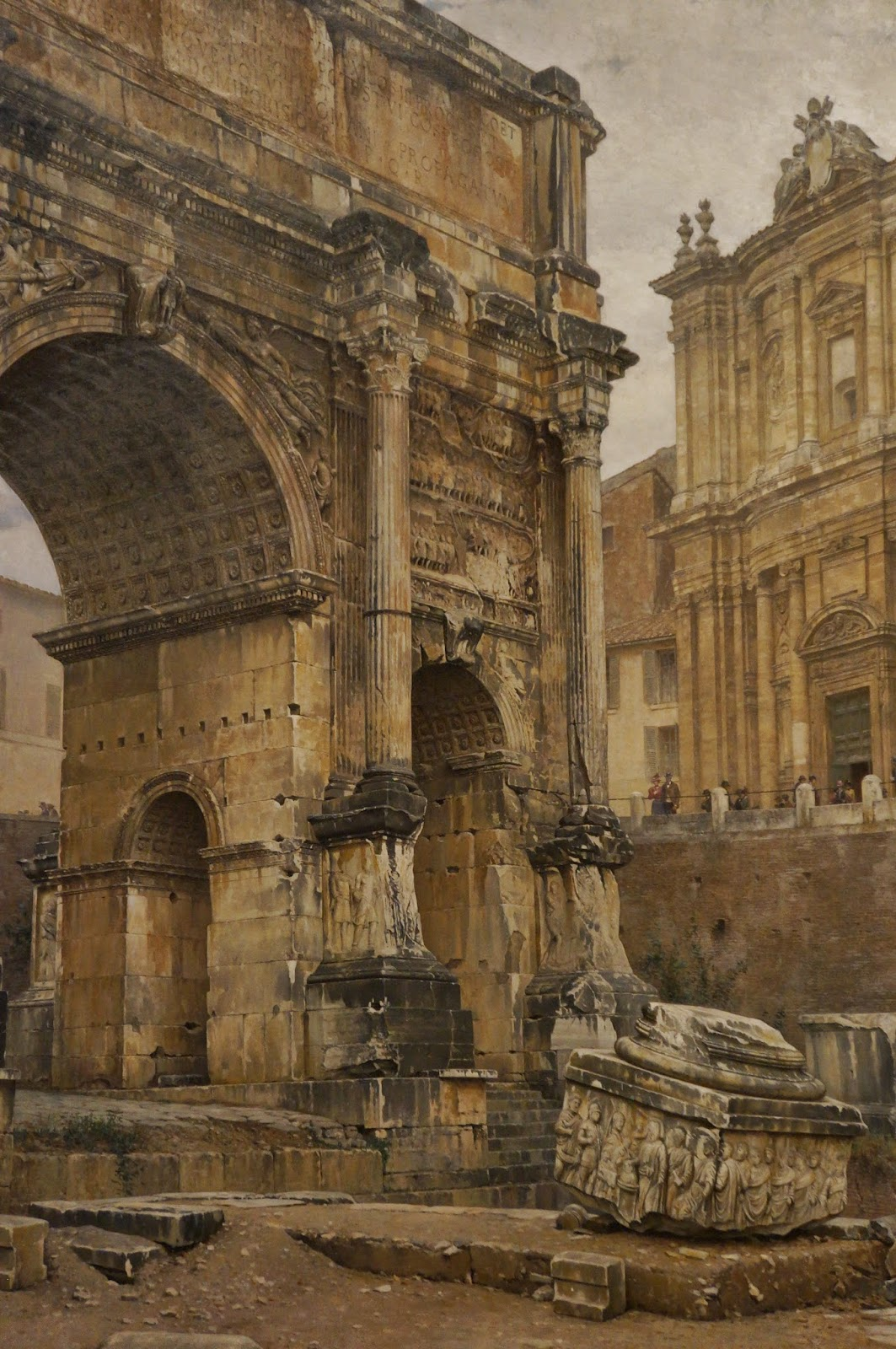
Arch of Septimius Severus in the Forum Romanum

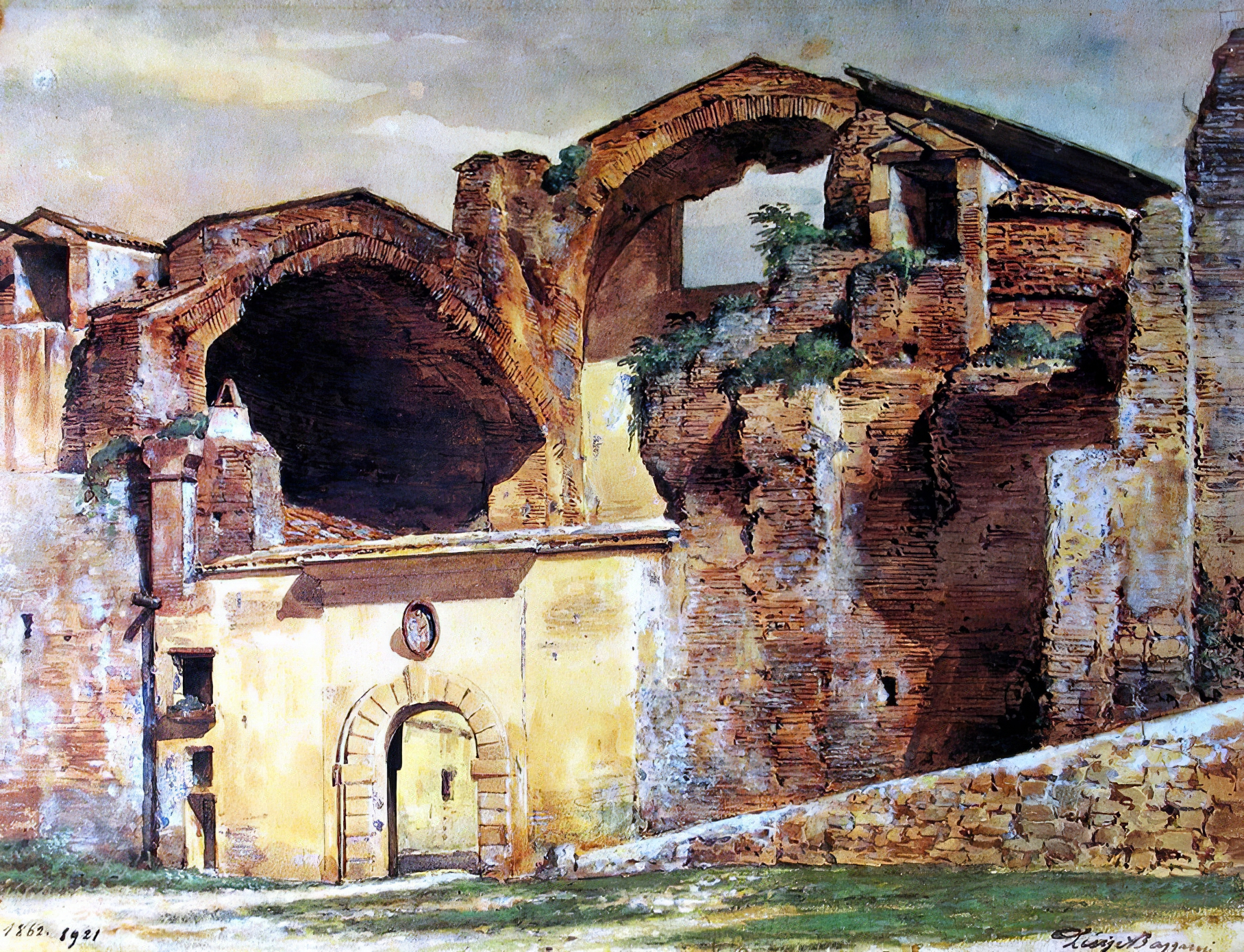
Termini ruins in Rome

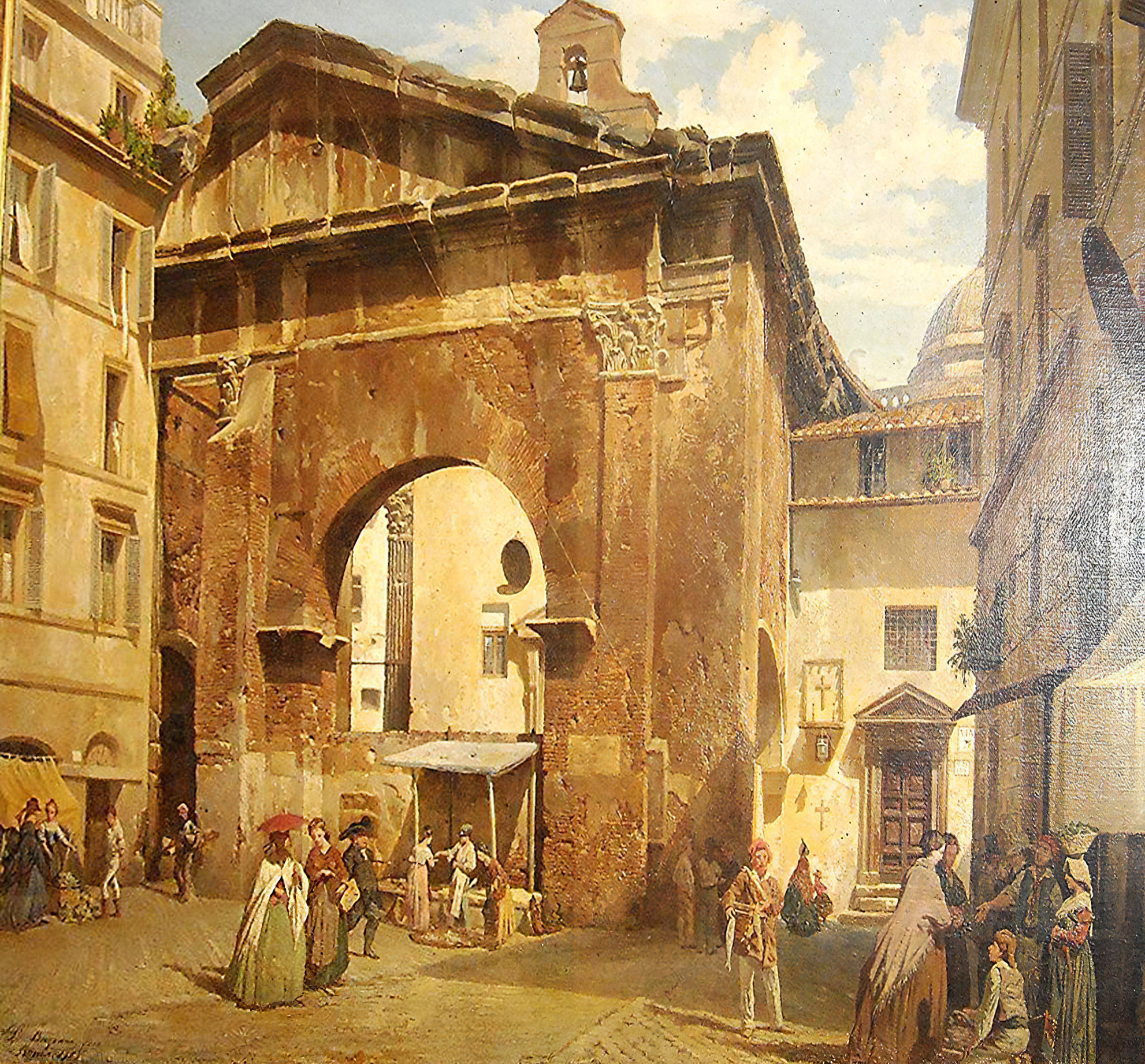
Portico of Octavia

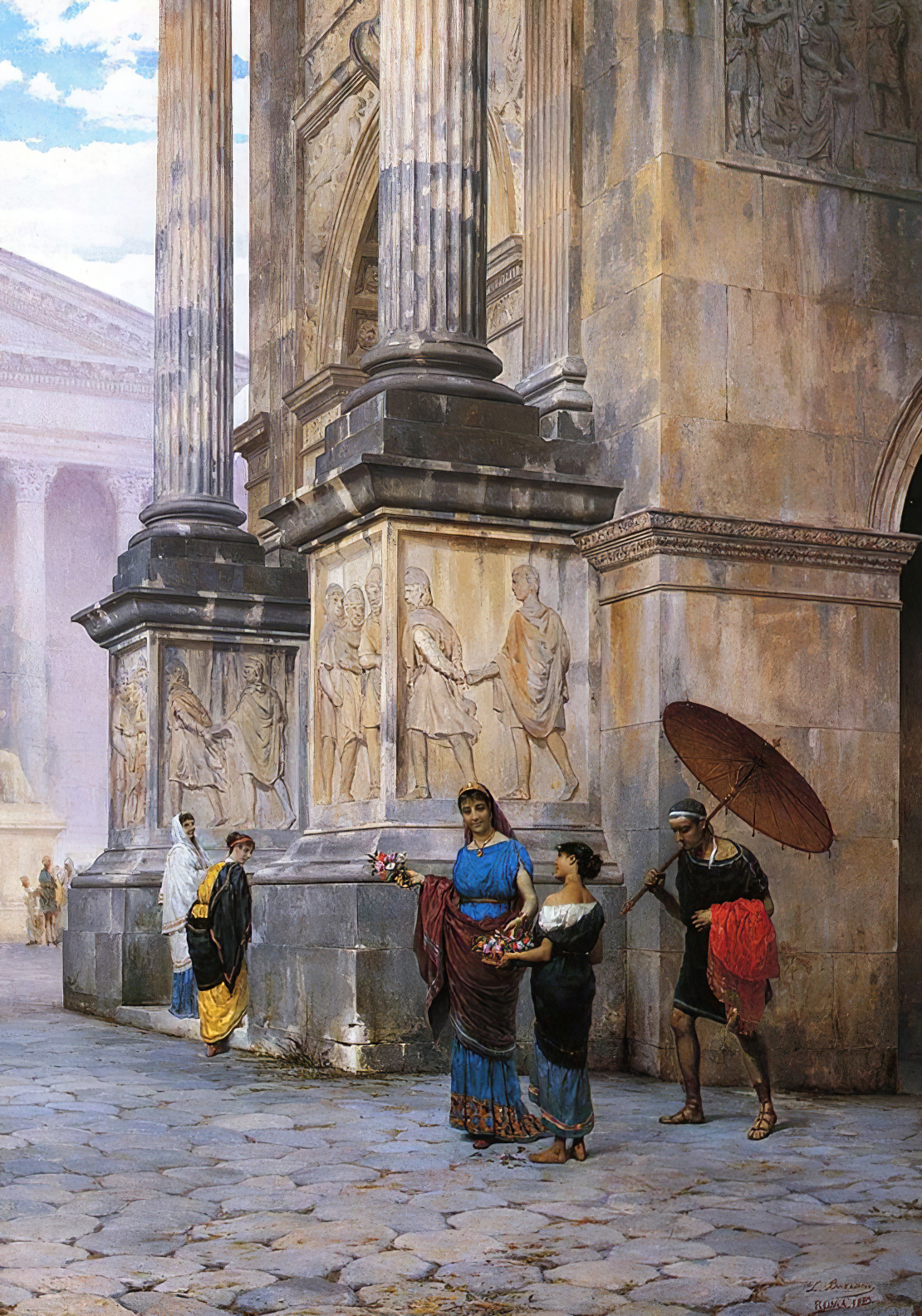
The Young Flower Seller

=== Neoclassical genre paintings ===
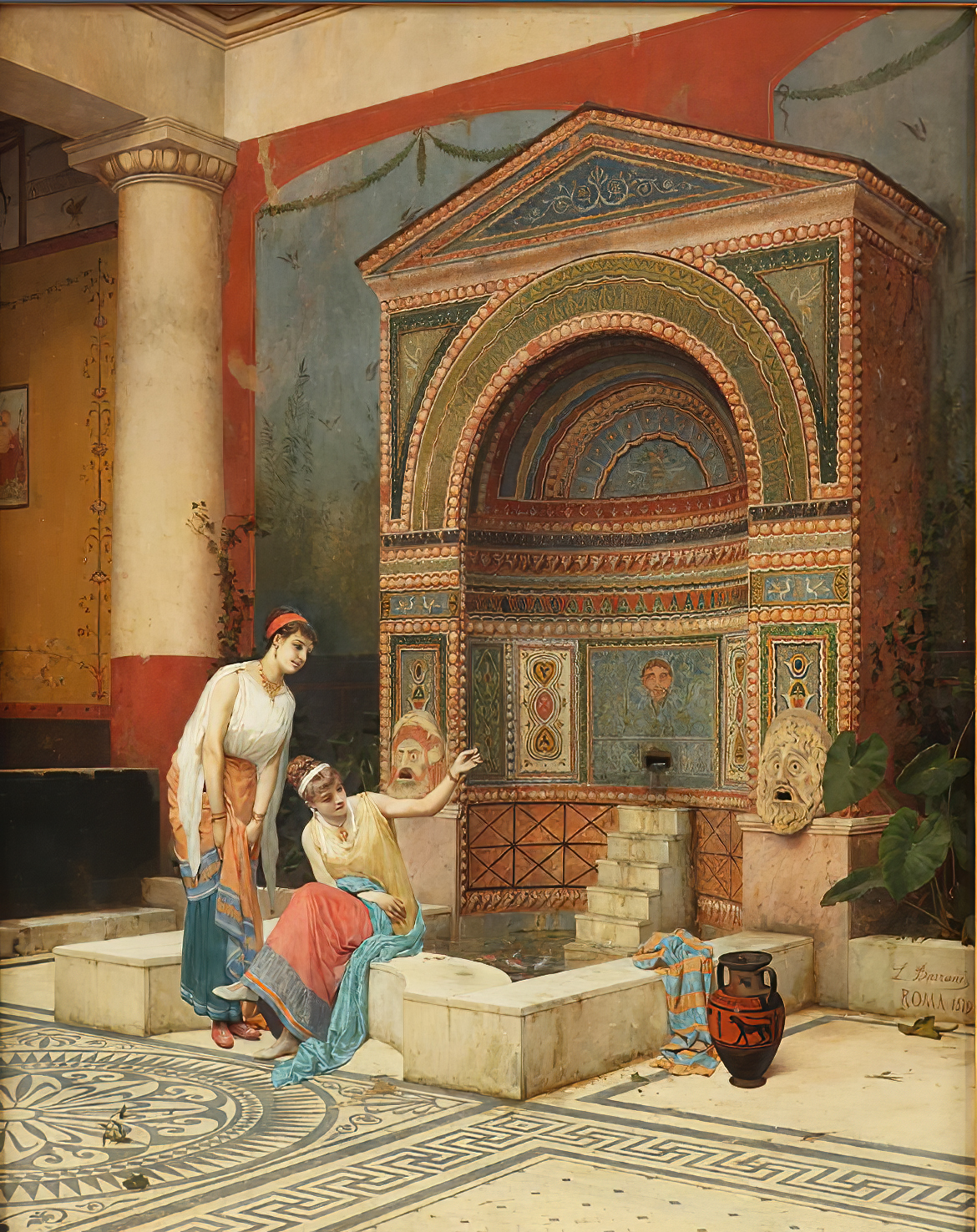
Women feeding fish in a Pompeiian atrium

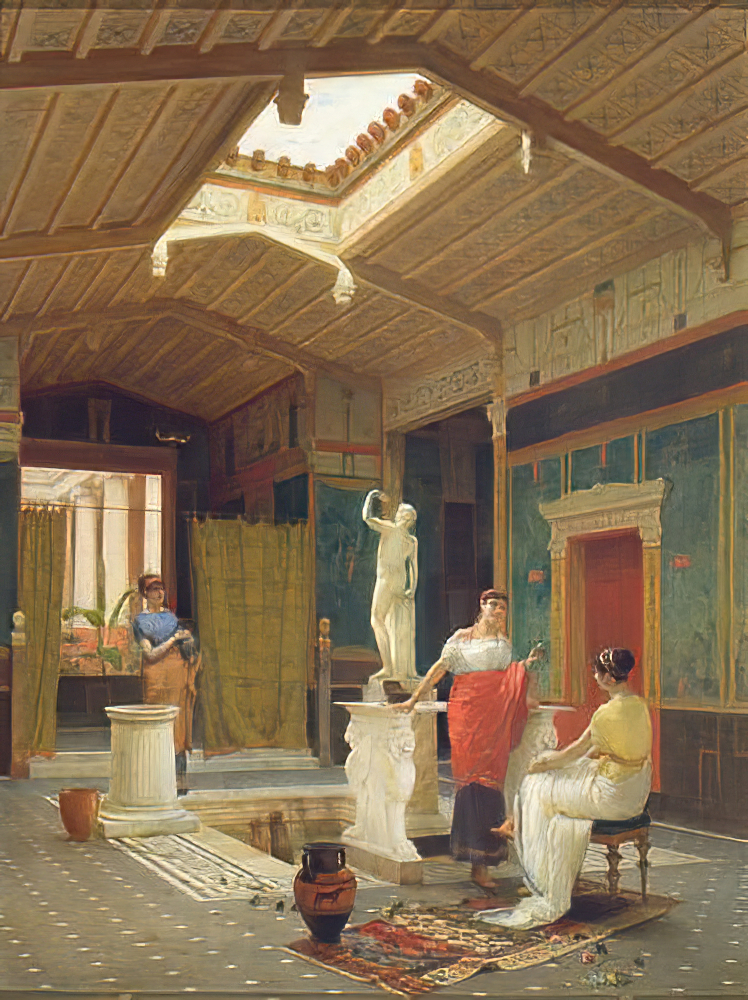
A Pompeian Interior

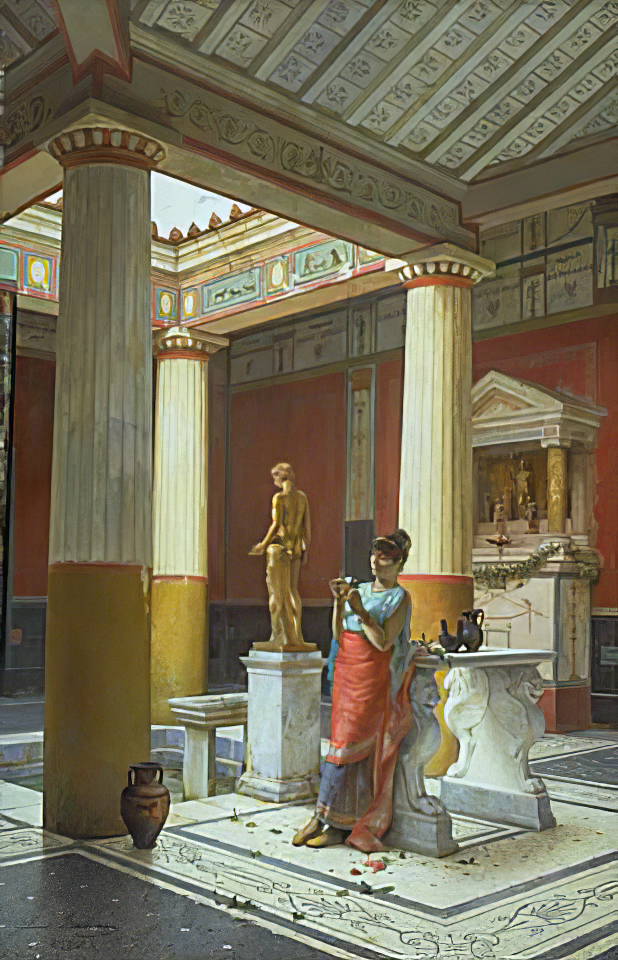
A Roman Interior

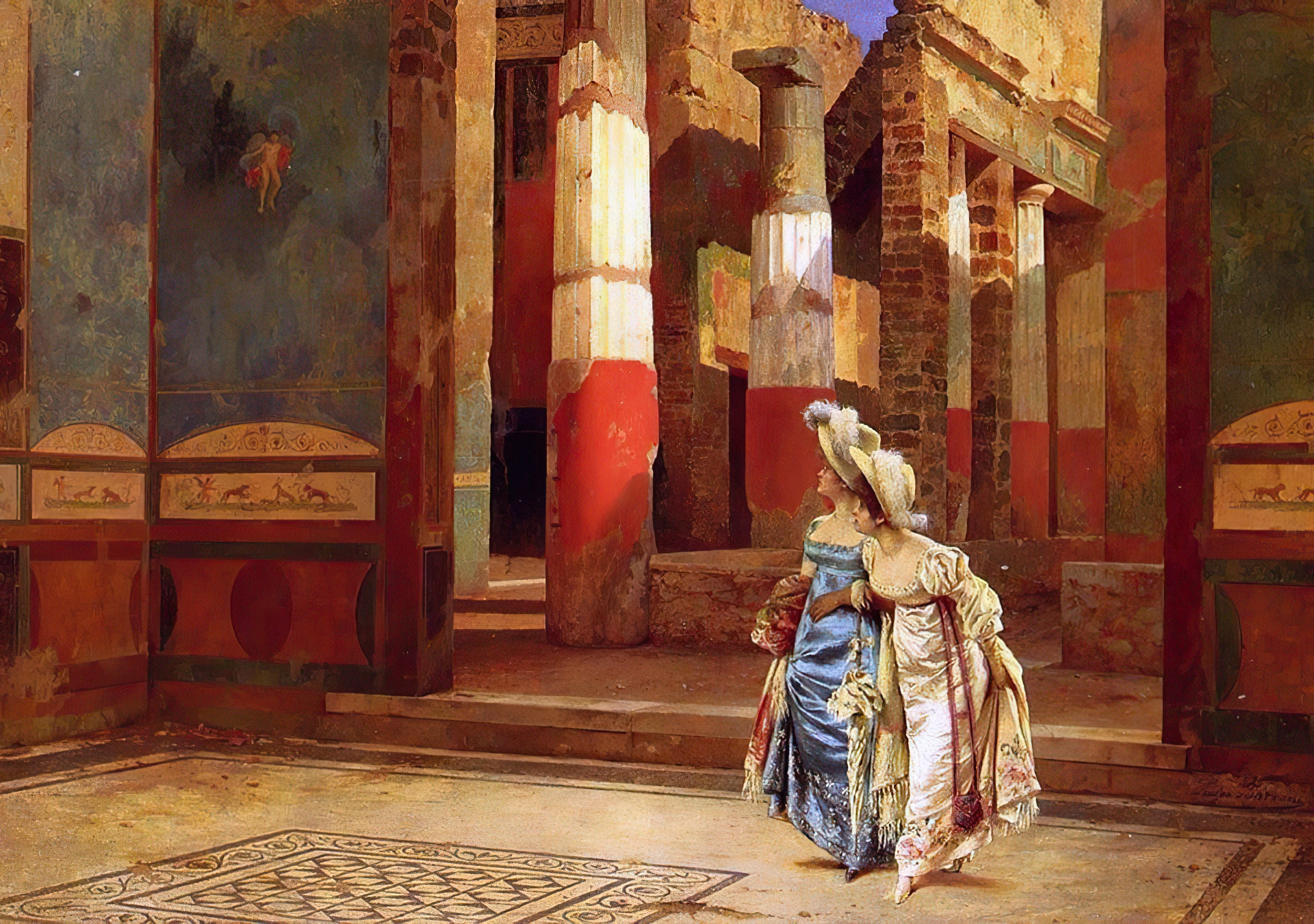
A visit to Pompeii

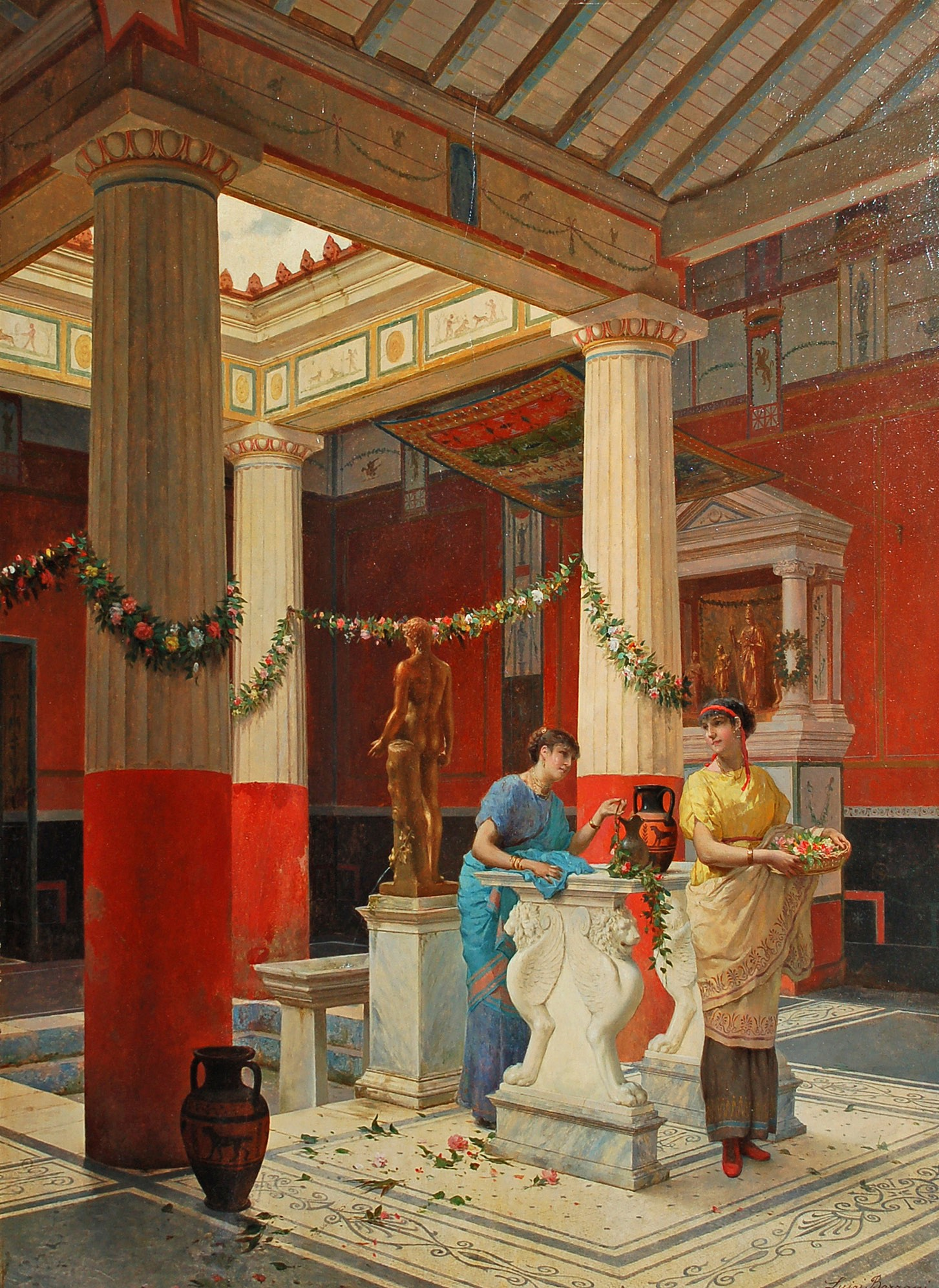
Decorating the Temple, 1887

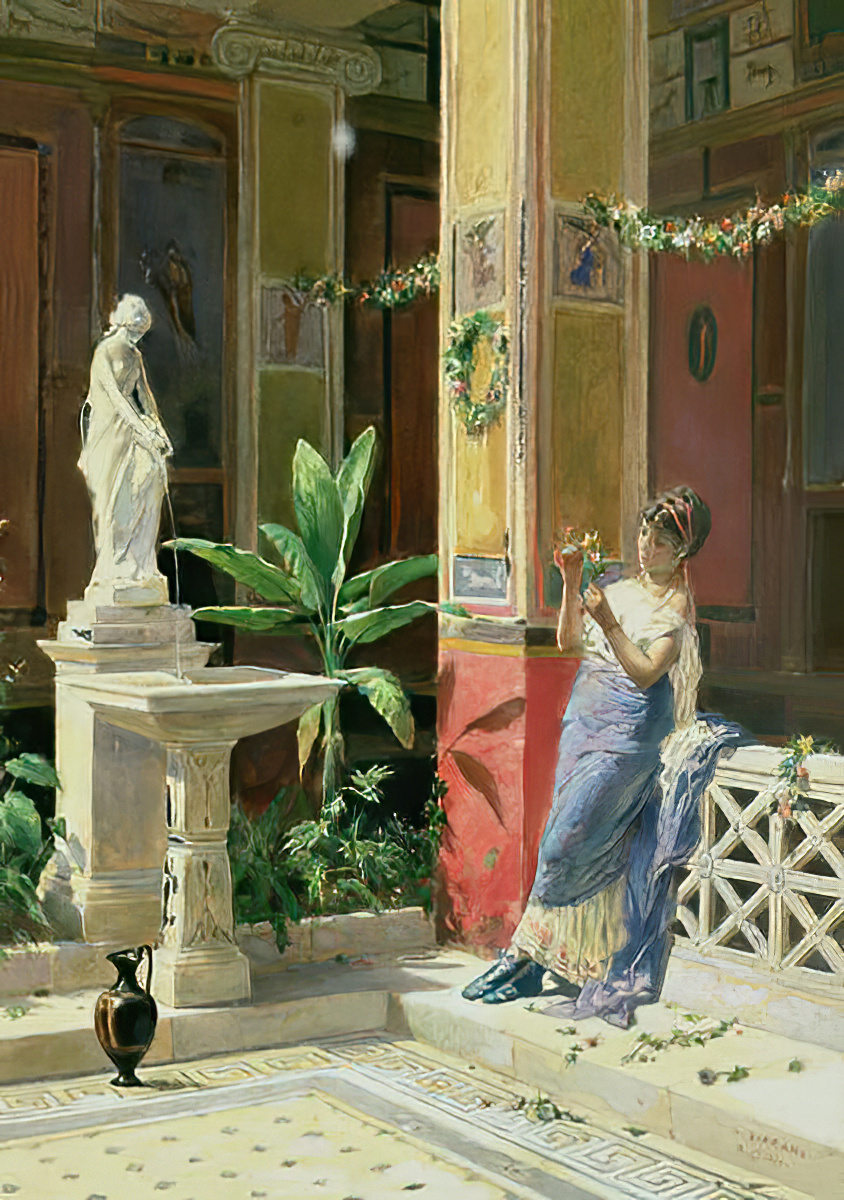
In a Courtyard in Pompeii,1878

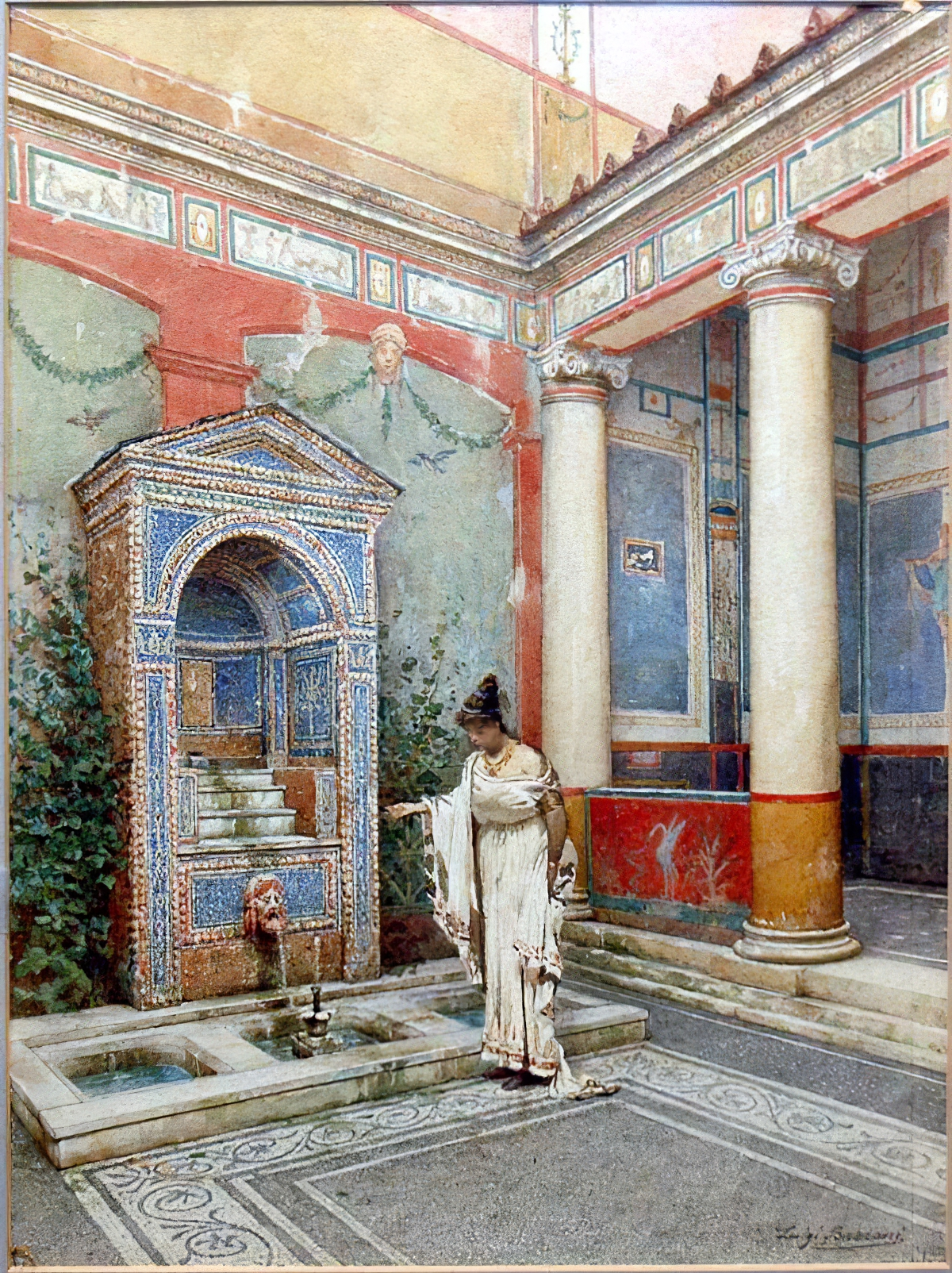
Pompeii atrium

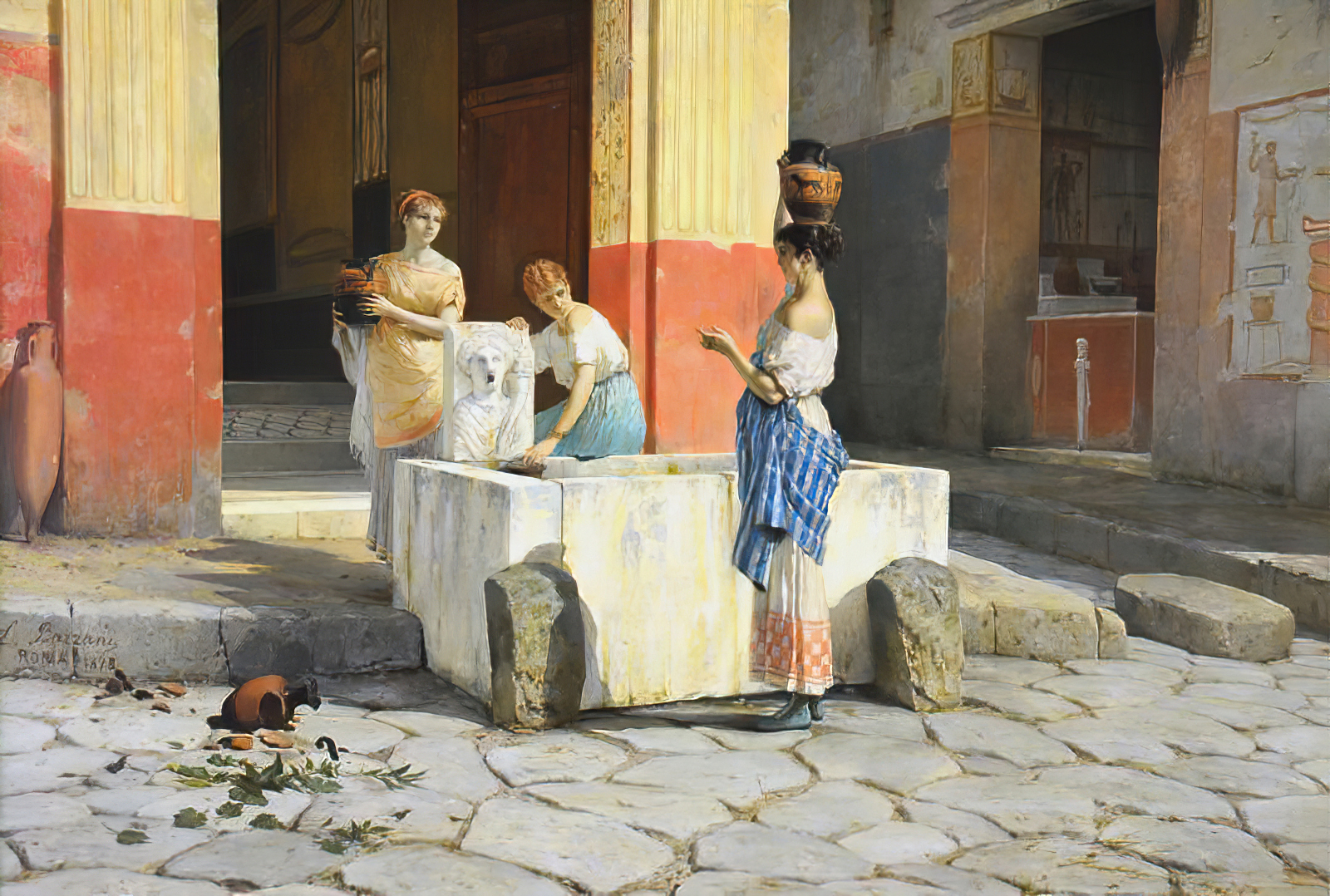
Women at the well

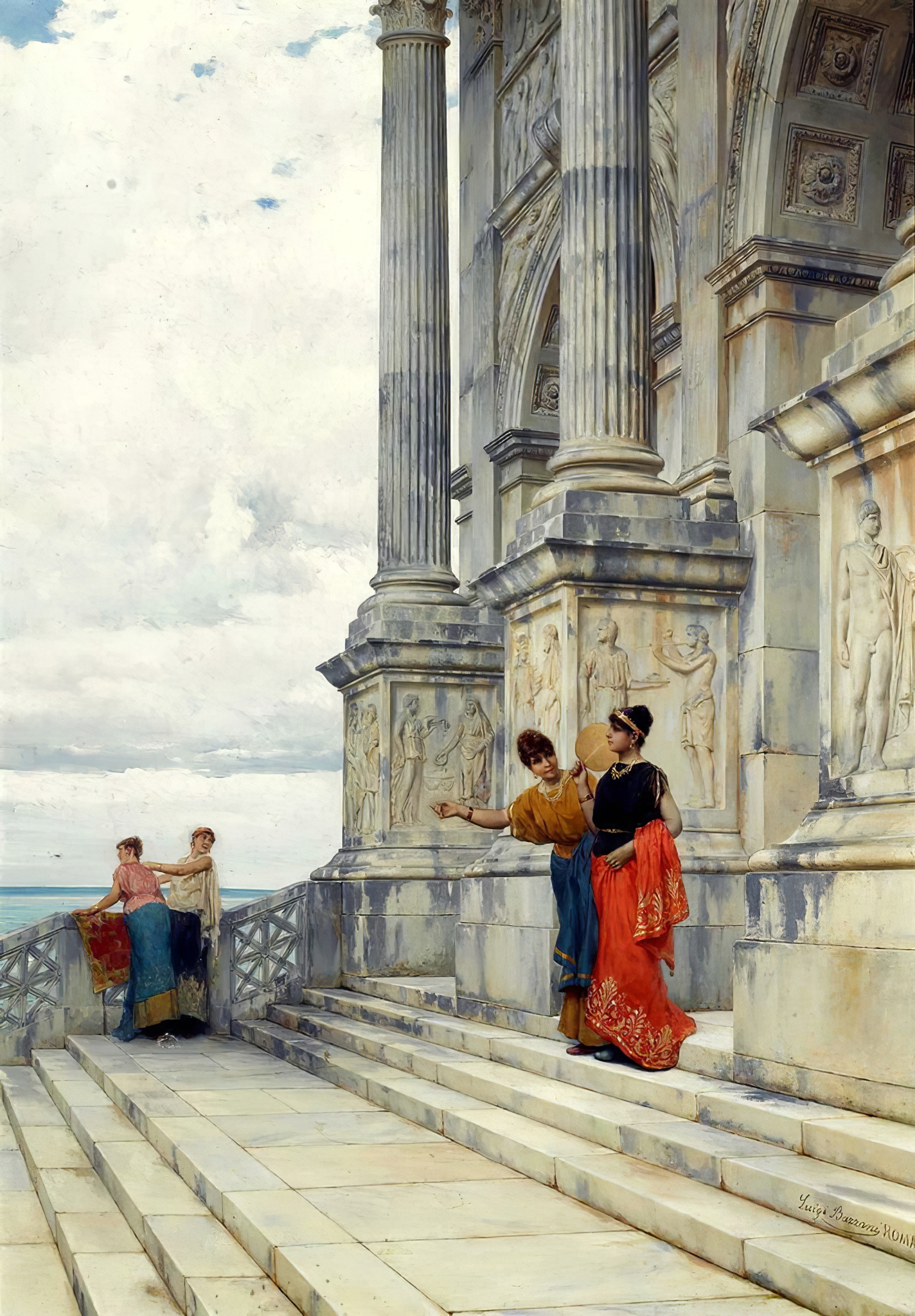
Roman life

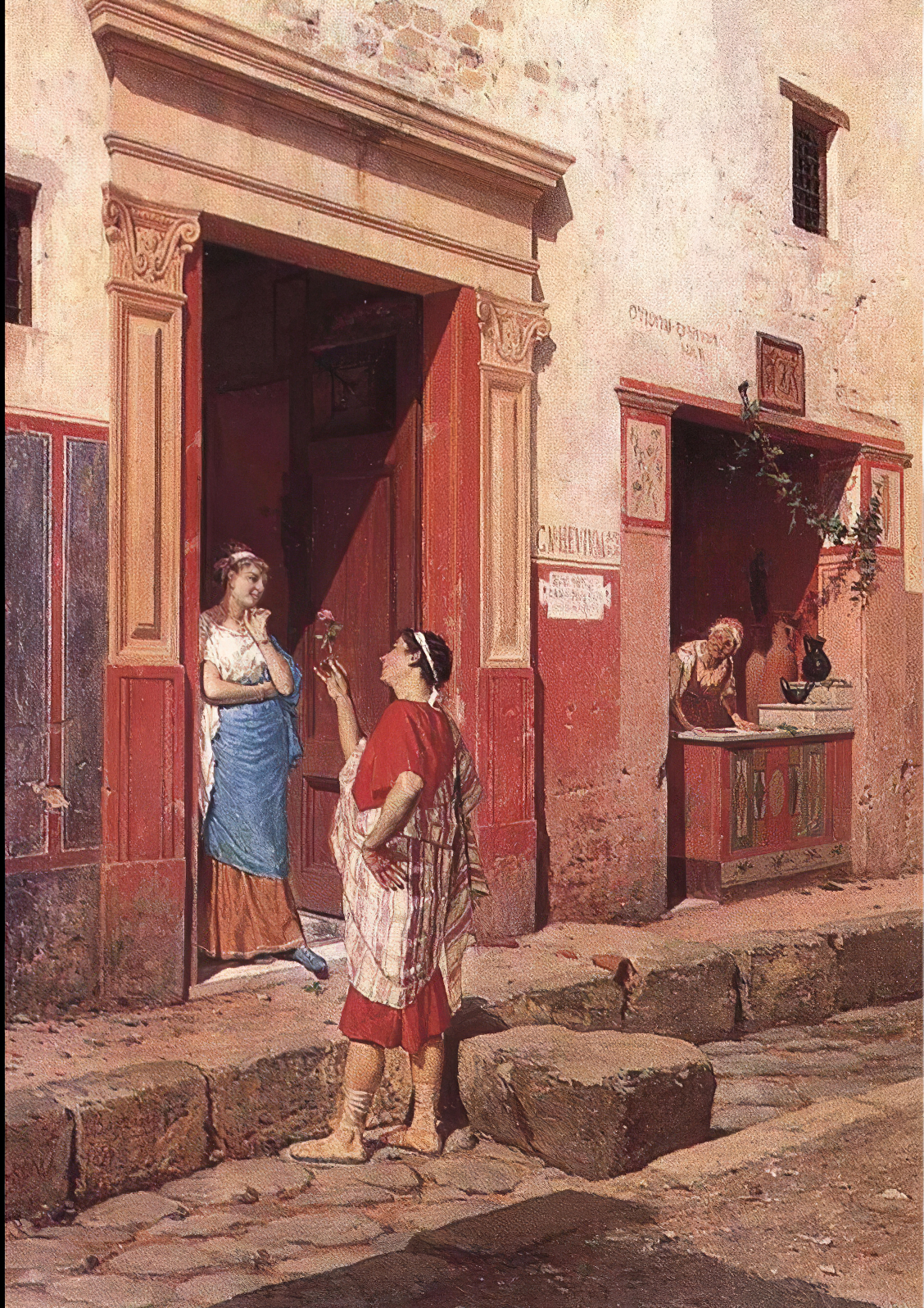
Pompeii Street Scene

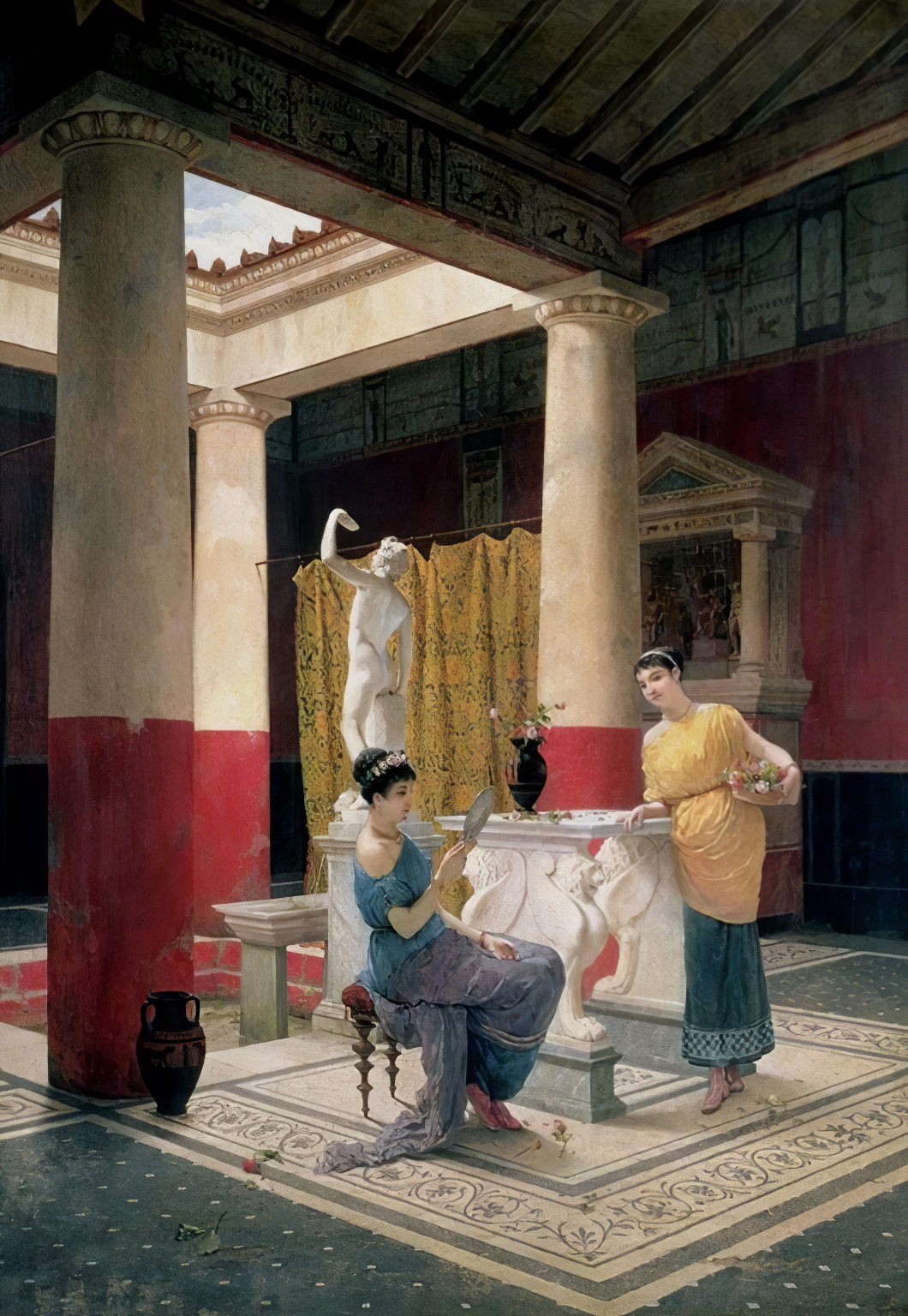
Women in a Pompeian Atrium

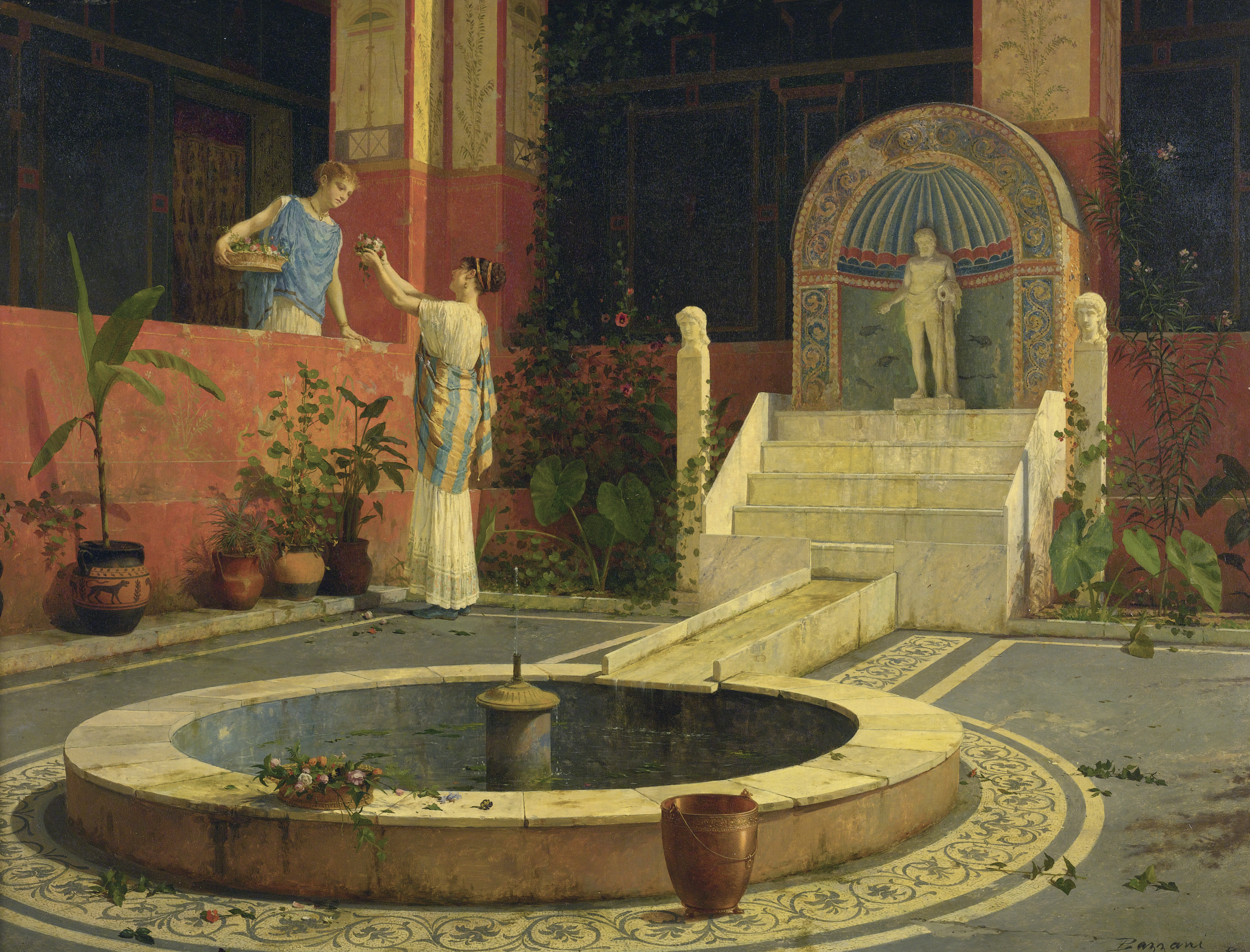
Picking flowers from the courtyard

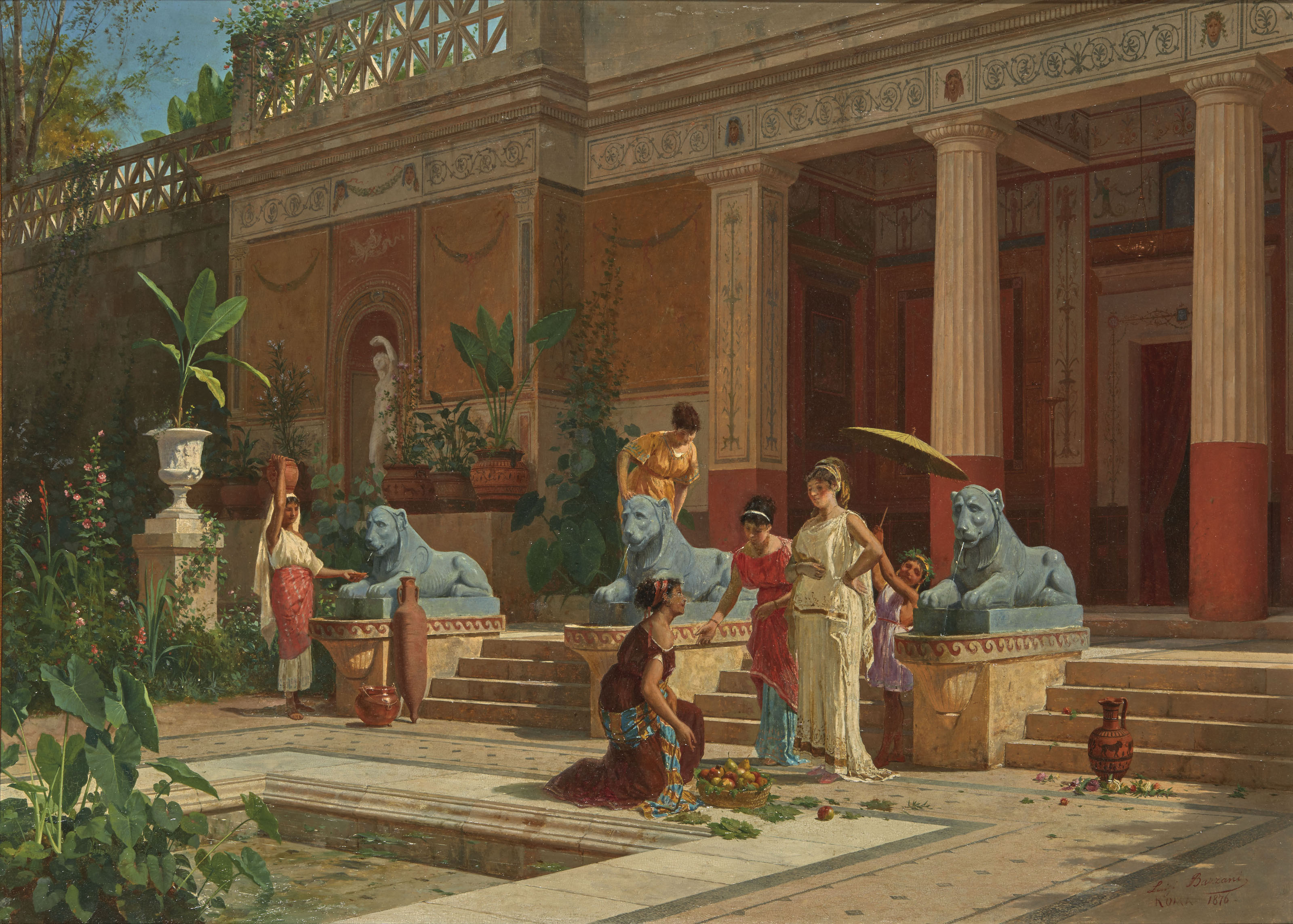
Fruit seller in the courtyard of a Pompeian Villa, 1876

== Death ==
Luigi Bazzani died on February 2, 1927, in Rome, Italy.
