= House of the Vettii =

House in Pompeii, Italy

Coordinates: 40°45′07″N 14°29′04″E

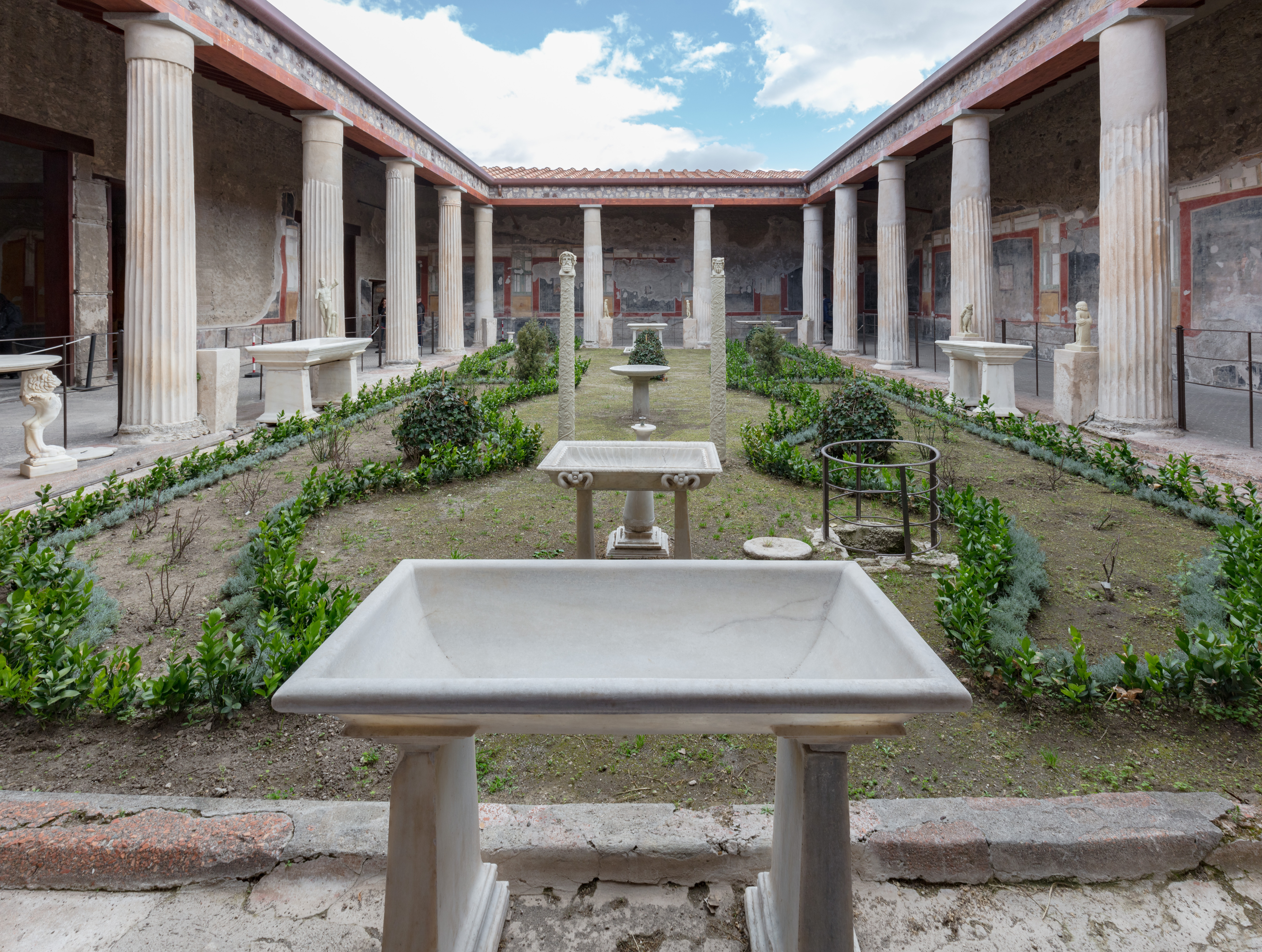
Peristylia of the house of the Vettii, Ancient Roman city of Pompeii, Italy from 2023

Map of Pompeii. House of the Vettii highlighted in red

The House of the Vettii is a domus located in the Roman town Pompeii, which was preserved by the eruption of Mount Vesuvius in 79 AD. The house is named for its owners, two successful freedmen: Aulus Vettius Conviva, an Augustalis, and Aulus Vettius Restitutus. Its careful excavation has preserved almost all of the wall frescos, which were completed following the earthquake of 62 AD, in the manner art historians term the Pompeiian Fourth Style. The House of the Vettii is located in region VI, near the Vesuvian Gate, bordered by the Vicolo di Mercurio and the Vicolo dei Vettii. The house is one of the largest domus in Pompeii, spanning the entire southern section of block 15. The plan is fashioned after a typical Roman domus, with the exception of an omitted tablinum. There are twelve mythological scenes across four cubicula and one triclinium. The house was reopened to tourists in January 2023 after two decades of restoration.

== Plan ==
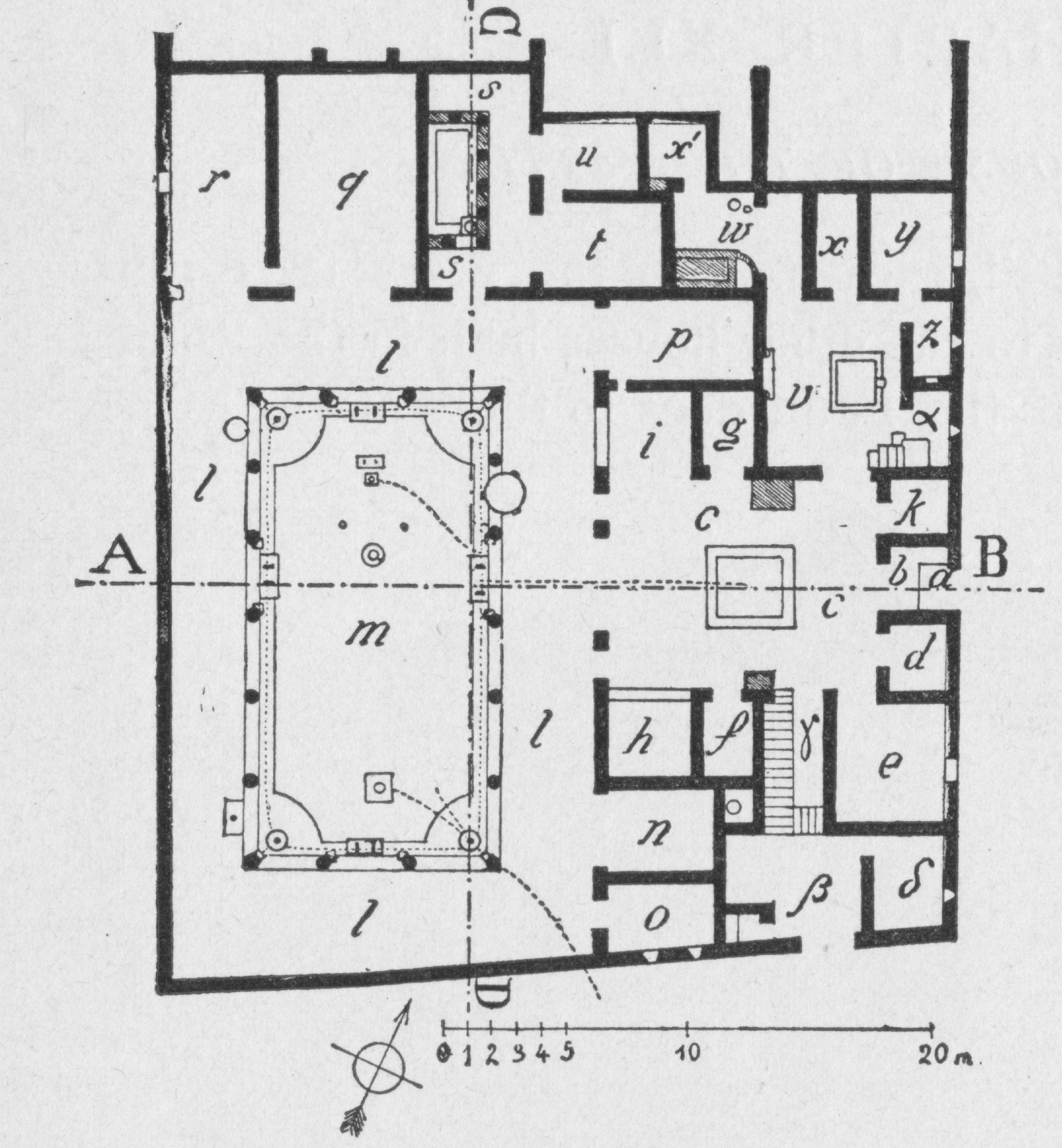
Floor Plan of the House of the Vettii Pompeii (VI 15,1) by August Mau 1907

The plan of the House of the Vettii is commonly divided into five major sections: the large atrium (c), the small atrium (v), the large peristyle (l-m), the small peristyle, and the shop. The house features a large garden as well as main living quarters and servant quarters. The service areas are centered around the smaller atrium while the main occupants remain around the larger atrium. There are two entrances to the main sections of the house, the main entrance is located on the east facade, entered from the Vicolo dei Vettii, and the second is entered from the Vicolo di Mercurio on the southern facade. In addition, there are five small windows on the east facade, two narrow vertical windows on the south facade, and a single small window on the west facade.

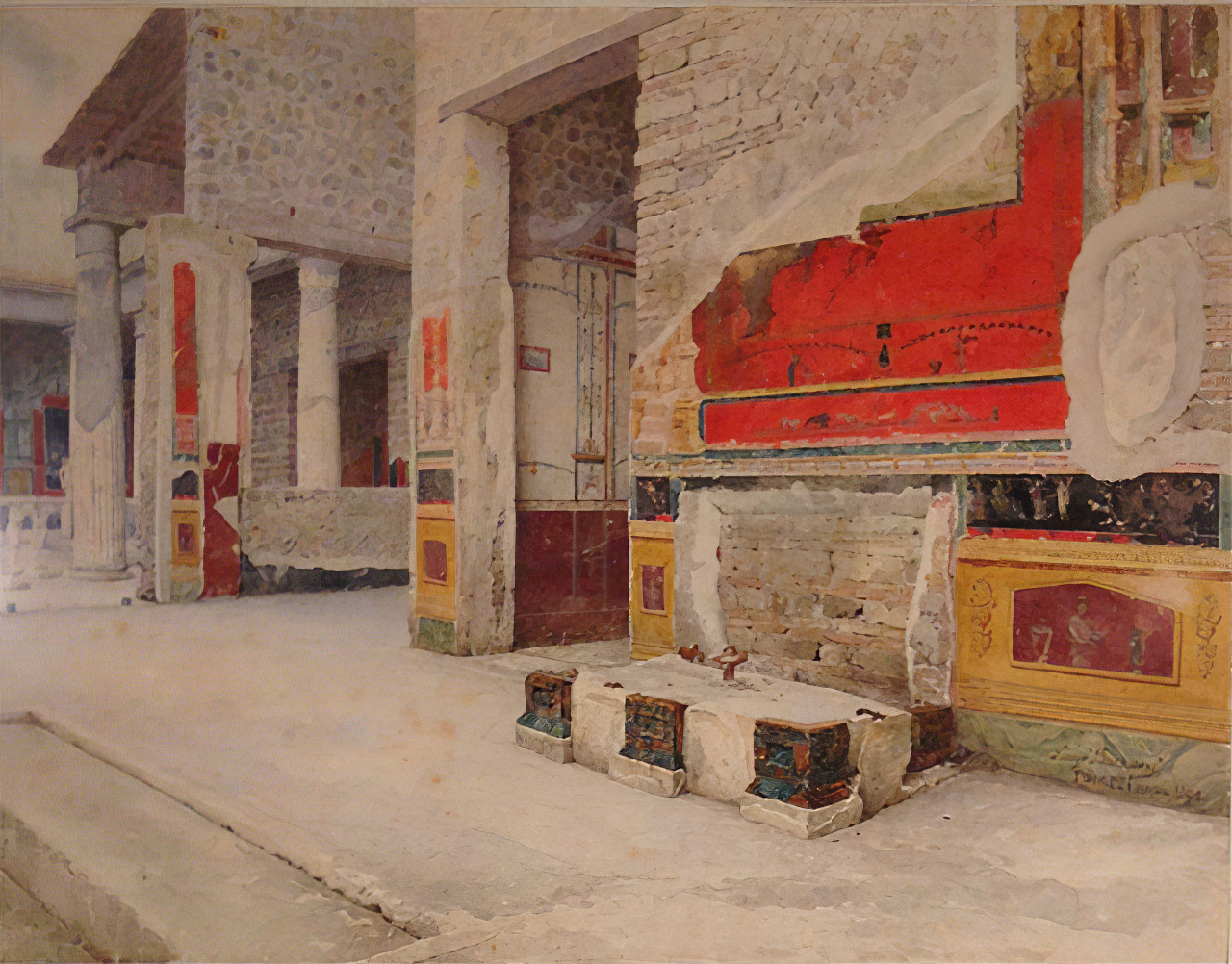
Atrium of the House of the Vetti VI 15 1 in Pompeii, 1895, by Luigi Bazzani

The small atrium and small peristyle are both located on the north section of the house. The large atrium is surrounded by four cubicula (bedrooms), which belonged most likely to the main occupants of the house. There are also two alae and a winter triclinium surrounding the atrium. To enter the atrium from the main entrance, one has to pass through the fauces and vestibulum. The small atrium is surrounded by four rooms which are believed to have been used by servants and as storage rooms. A kitchen is also located near the small atrium along with a cubiculum meant to house the cook and an impluvium, which was designed to catch rainwater from an opening in the roof. A staircase was found in the southeast corner of the small atrium but the second floor no longer remains.

There are two service areas in the house, the first being centered around the small atrium. The second was accessible from the main atrium of the house as well as the second entrance from the Vicolo di Mercurio on the south facade. Here a large gate opened into the shop, also known as the taberna. Draft animals were moved through this gate and stabled in the shop. Beside the shop is an additional chamber and latrine.

When looking through the main entrance and large atrium, it is possible to view the rear garden, surrounded by the large peristyle. Overlooking the peristyle are two triclinia, an oecus, and two storage rooms. Most of the rooms in the house open to either the front hall or rear garden. The small peristyle is located to the north of the house. Beside the small peristyle are a triclinium and a cubiculum.

Unique to the House of the Vettii, a tablinum is not included in the plan.

== Paintings ==
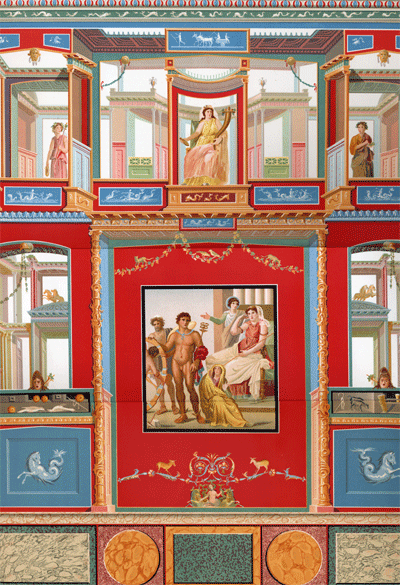
1895 watercolor of east wall of exedra p (Mau plan) by Luigi Bazzani depicting punishment of Ixion

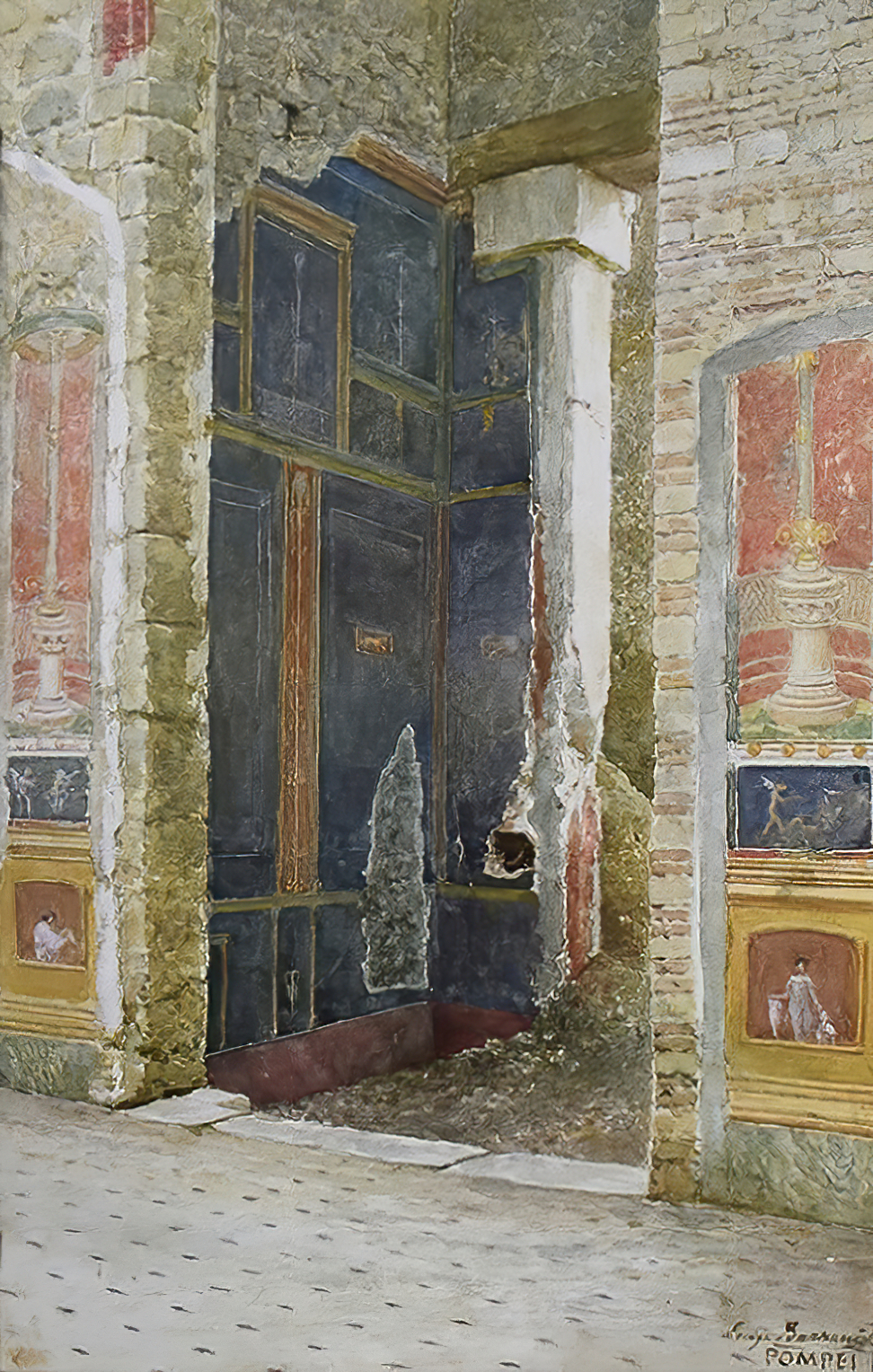
House of the Vetti by Luigi Bazzani (watercolor) before 1927

The House of the Vettii features a large assortment of fresco paintings in the Pompeian Fourth style. There are twelve surviving panels, which depict mythological scenes. The Fourth Style is identified by its combination of the previous three styles. At the bottom of the wall we see a ring of faux colored marble, which is indicative of the First Pompeian style. Secondly, there is interest in creating illusionistic scenes, evident in the top ring and besides the mythological scenes, that is borrowed from the Second style. Lastly, the unrealistically thin columns supporting the upper ring of the wall frescoes is taken from the Third style. New to the style are the mythological scenes, of which there are twelve remaining in the House of the Vettii. It is believed that the scenes are copied from Greek models, but no Greek paintings have survived to compare the frescoes to. The twelve panels are located in the two triclinia positioned off of the peristyle garden and the triclinium next to the small peristyle. The remaining panels are in the triclinium and the cubiculum to the left of the main entrance. The paintings combine to create a theme of divine reward and punishment, with one particularly showing the power of Jupiter (Zeus) and his sons as the enforcers of world order.

Beyond the twelve mythological paintings, many more artworks are displayed in the House of the Vettii. Most famous are the two depictions of Priapus, the god of fertility. The first image of Priapus is a fresco in the doorway. The painting depicts Priapus weighing his phallic member on a set of scales. The second image mirrors the first but in marble.

=== Punishment of Ixion ===
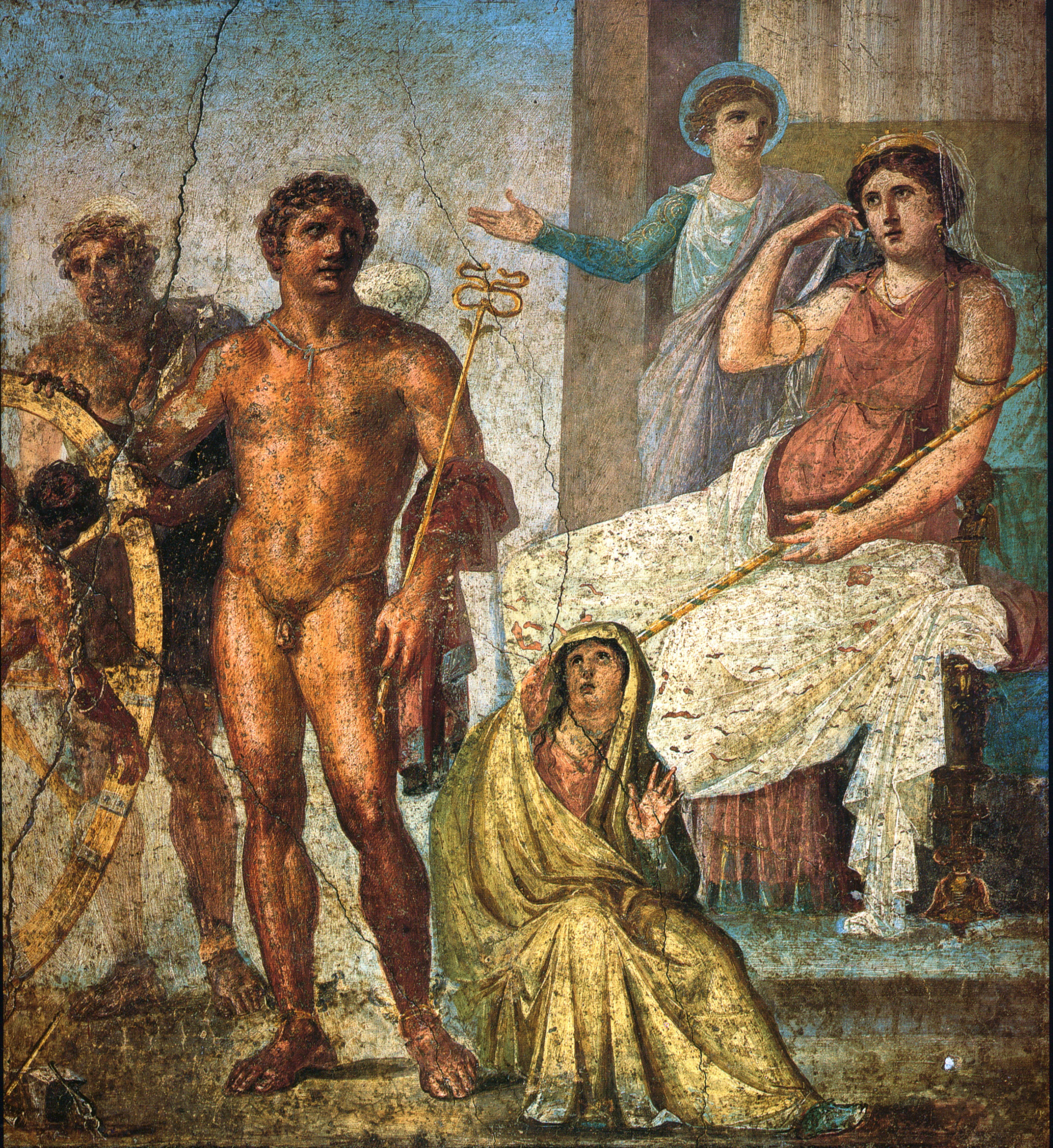
Close up of the Punishment of Ixion in the House of the Vettii in Pompeii

This mythological scene is located on the east wall of the north triclinium, which is located next to the large peristyle. It shows the moment of Ixion, (the Lapith King), being punished for betraying Zeus. After being welcomed into Olympus by the god, Ixion grew to lust after Zeus's wife, Hera. After Ixion attempts to seduce her, Zeus creates the cloud goddess Nephele in the image of Hera. Ixion lies with Nephele and their union creates the centaurs. As punishment, Zeus banishes Ixion from Olympus and orders Hermes to tie Ixion to a winged fiery wheel, which is to spin for eternity.

In this scene, Ixion is bound to the wheel and Hermes stands in the forefront, identifiable by his winged sandals and caduceus. Hephaestus stands behind the wheel, one hand resting on the wheel to set it into motion. Hermes, however, also has one hand on the wheel keeping it still as he looks to Hera. Hera is enthroned to the right, holding a long golden scepter and wearing a golden crown. Beside her is her messenger, Iris, extending her arm to present to Hera Ixion's punishment. Hera pulls aside her thin veil to watch the scene. A young woman sits next to Hermes with one hand up. She is often identified by scholars as either Ixion's mother or Nephele.

=== Daedalus and Pasiphae ===
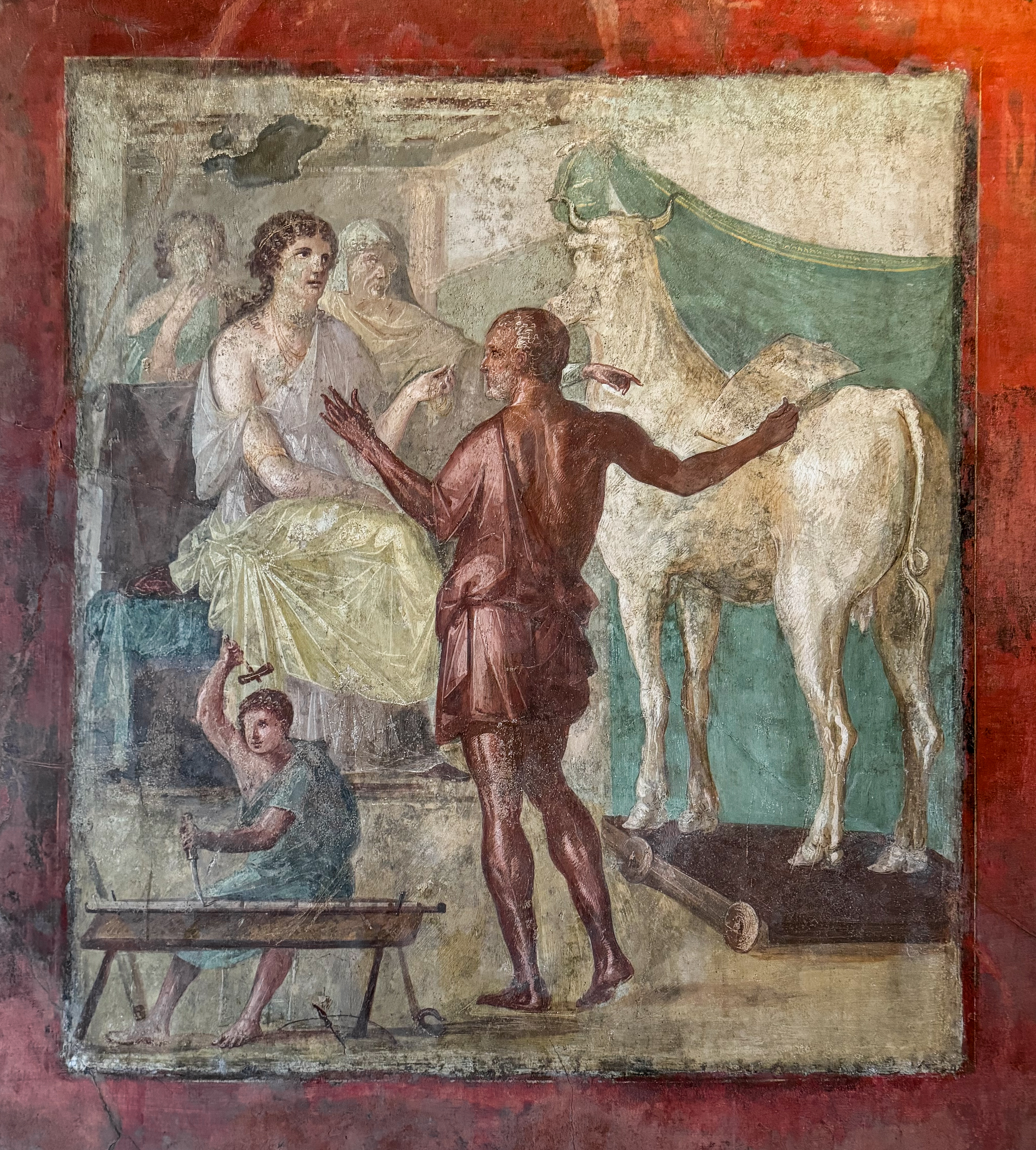
Fresco depicting Daedalus presenting his wooden cow to Pasiphae

The mythological scene, Daedalus and Pasiphae is located on the north wall of the same triclinium where the Punishment of Ixion is depicted. This scene depicts King Minos's wife, Pasiphae, and the craftsman Daedalus, whom Pasiphae ordered to construct a cow so she could sleep with her husband's Dionysus treasured bull. Her lust towards the bull was a consequence of King Minos refusing to sacrifice the bull to Poseidon, angering the god who punished King Minos by making Pasiphae lust after the bull. Pasiphae later becomes pregnant with the Minotaur. Daedalus and his son Icarus were punished through imprisonment by King Minos for his assistance, leading into the famous myth of a winged escape from Crete.

Depicted in this scene is Daedalus presenting to Pasiphae the wooden cow. Daedalus is positioned in the middle of the painting with his back turned. He places one hand on the wooden cow and gestures with his other hand, explaining the cow to Pasiphae and her entourage. Pasiphae is seated to the left with two attendants behind her. All three figures look past Daedalus, focusing on an area above the cow. One attendant points to the opening in the cow's back. A young boy sits to the left of Daedalus, either an apprentice or Icarus. The boy raises a hammer in his right hand and holds a chisel in his left, placed against the wooden beam.

=== Dionysus discovering Ariadne ===
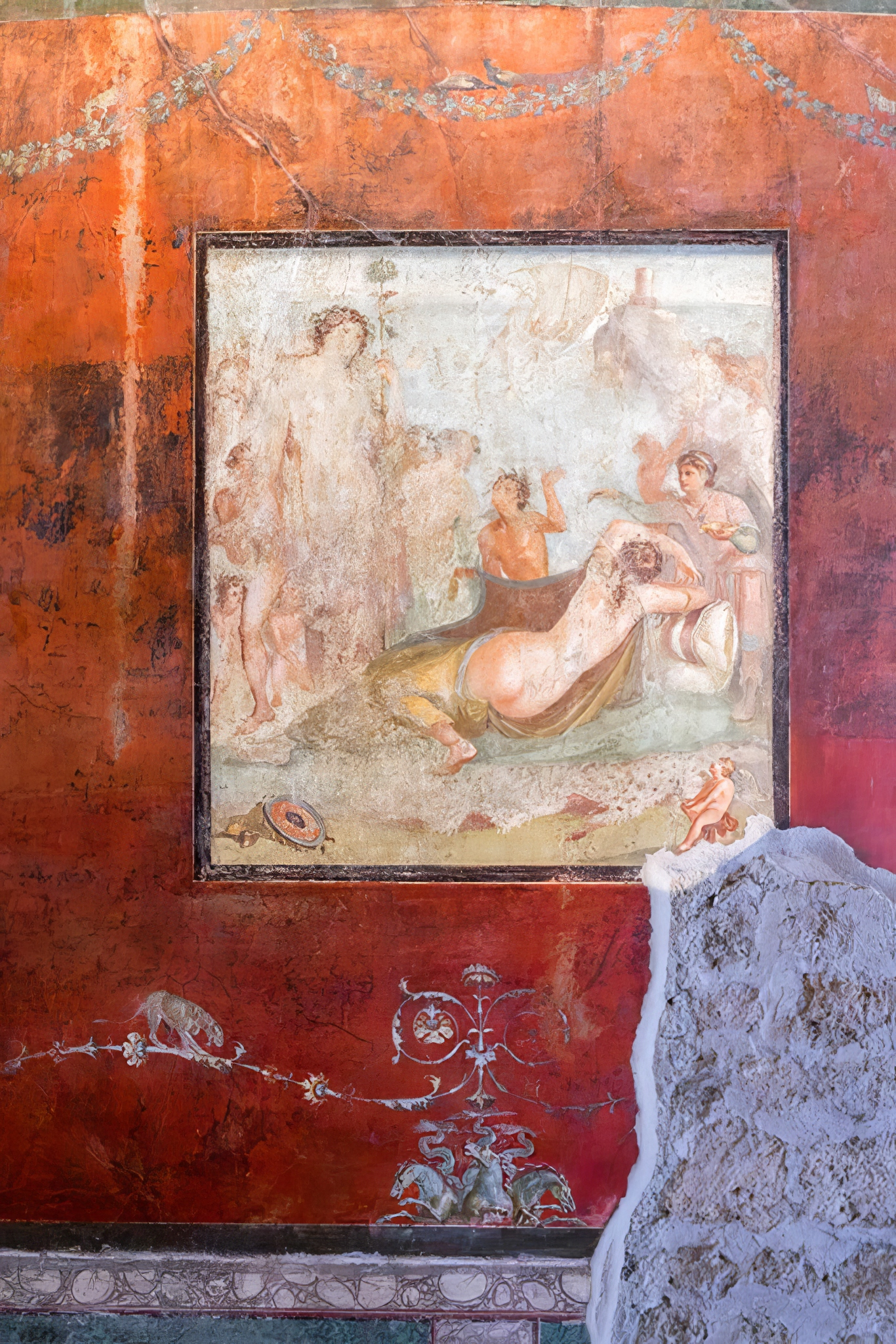
Dionysus (Bacchus) looking over the sleeping Ariadne after she was abandoned by Theseus exedra p (Mau plan)

The final mythological scene in the north triclinium is Dionysus discovering Ariadne on the south wall. The scene of Dionysus discovering Ariadne was a popular theme in Greek vase painting. It depicts the moment Dionysus discovers Ariadne, the daughter of King Minos and Pasiphae. After being abandoned by Theseus, the slayer of the Minotaur, Dionysus finds her sleeping on the island of Naxos and weds her.

In this scene Ariadne lies on a large leopard skin, with her back to the viewer. She wears gold armlets and anklets, tiny blue flowers in her hair, and a yellow mantle with a light-blue border. The mantle is wrapped around her legs and pulled up towards her front. Her back and bottom are nude. She leans against a white pillow with her right elbow and her left arm rests on top of her head, her fingers touching her upper right arm. The god of sleep, Hypnos, stands to the right of the image, besides Ariadne's pillow. He holds a branch over Ariadne to sprinkle water from a small gold dish in his left hand, inducing sleep. Hypnos is winged and garbed in a green undergarment with long sleeves, a light-blue band around his head, and brown boots with a gold lion on the upper edge. To the left of the image, Dionysus stands in poor condition. From what is able to be deduced, Dionysus stands at a slight three-quarter view, wearing ivy leaves in his hair and a long red mantle that leaves his front exposed. He gazes down at Ariadne, a tall thyrsos in his left hand. The thyrsos has a circular cluster of leaves and a gold eagle with outstretched wings. Next to Dionysus are three satyrs, two to his right and one to his left. Two maenads are possibly depicted in the painting. One is depicted to the right of Dionysus, wearing a long green garment and leaves in the hair. The maenad looks towards Ariadne. The other is to the right of Ariadne, looking over her shoulder. In the center a satyr lifts an edge of Ariadne's mantle and gestures to her exposed body. Cupid is depicted in the lower right corner with his hands clasped around his right leg as he gazes at Ariadne. In the left hand corner are a red and blue tambourine and two small gold cymbals. A seascape is depicted in the background.

=== Death of Pentheus ===
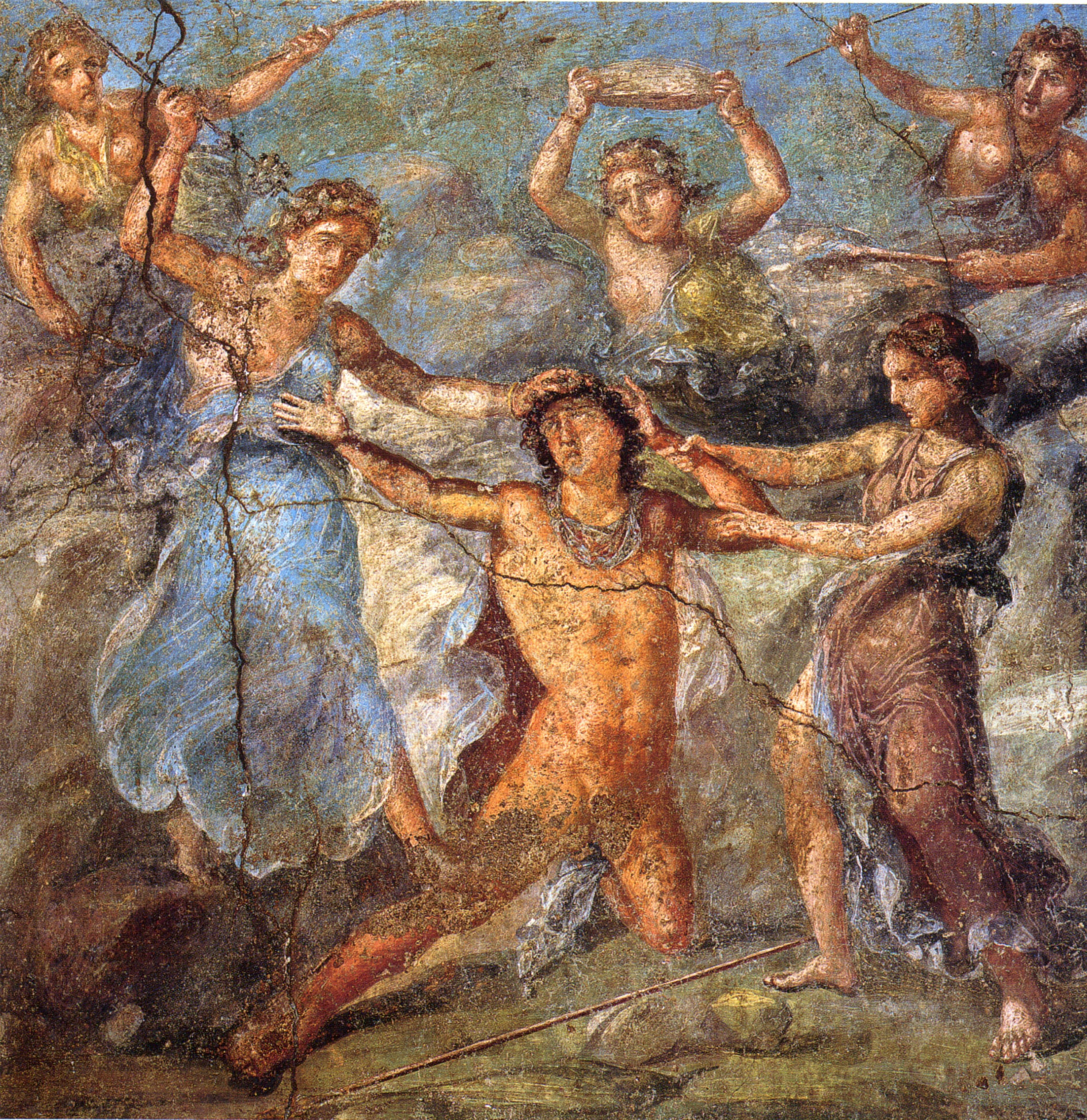
Death of Pentheus

The Death of Pentheus scene is located in the southern triclinium, surrounding the large peristyle, and painted on the east wall. The scene depicts Pentheus, the legendary King of Thebes, being killed by the female followers of Dionysus. When Dionysus returned to Thebes, Pentheus refused to believe Dionysus's divinity as a god and imprisoned him, banning his worship. Dionysus escaped and enchanted Pentheus to go to Mt. Cithairon, disguised as a maenad. There he observed the celebration of the cult of Dionysus by the women of Thebes. In attendance was Pentheus' mother Agave and her sisters Ino and Autonoë. The women discovered Pentheus, hidden behind a pine tree, but mistook him as a lion. The women then attacked Pentheus, tearing him to pieces.

In the scene depicted, Pentheus' mother and her sisters have discovered Pentheus and have begun to tear him apart. In the front is Pentheus who has fallen to one knee. His left hand is raised to his head and his right is stretched outwards with his palm facing up. To his right he stares at a maenead who has her foot on his left knee and grasps his hair with her left hand. She raises a thyrsos in her right hand to strike him with. To his left is another maenad who grabs his left arm with both hands and leans back to pull him back. Below Pentheus is a spear. Behind him are three other females. The center maenad holds a stone above her head, about to hurl it at Pentheus. Two erinys are in each upper hand corner. The erinys in the left corner raises a whip to strike Pentheus.

=== Punishment of Dirce ===
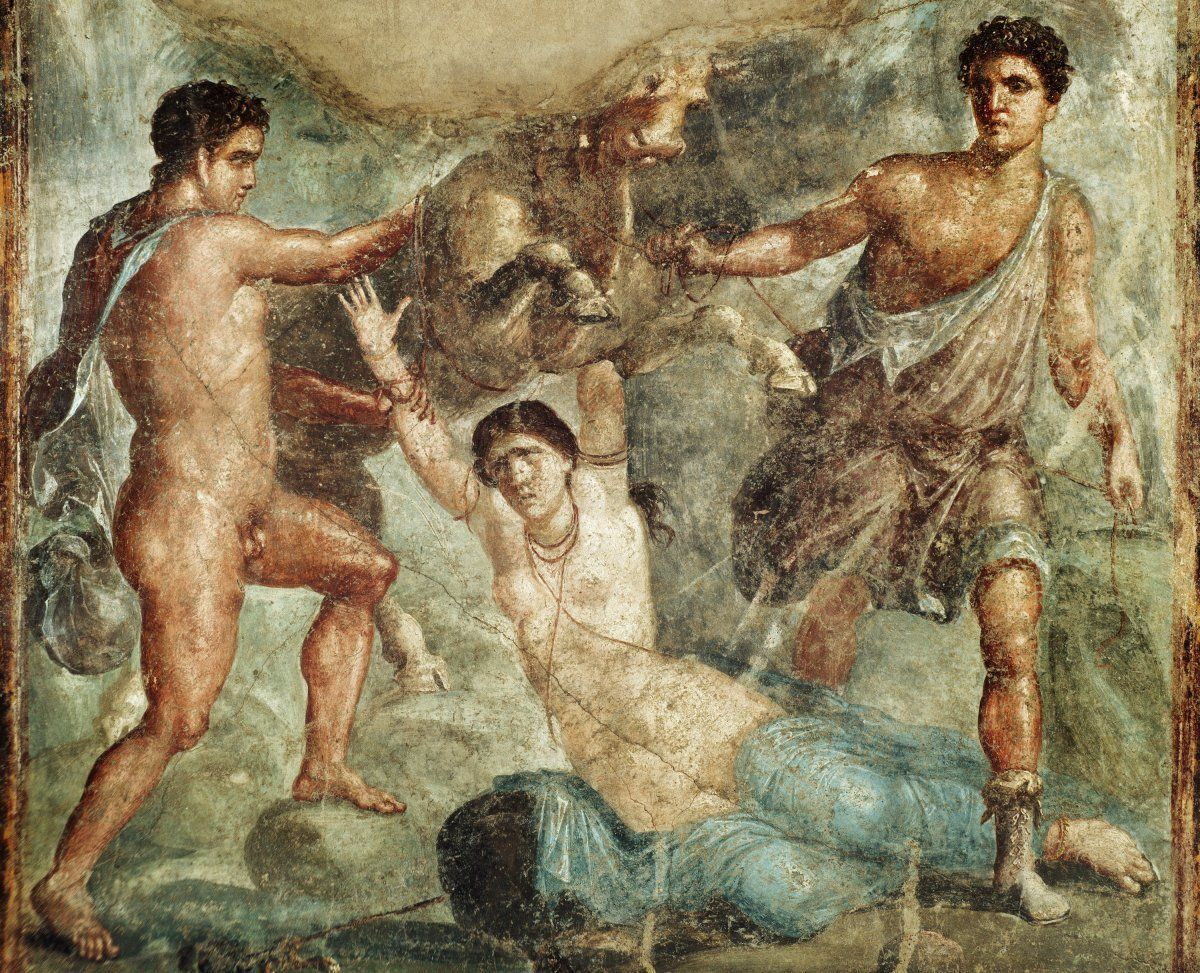
Punishment of Dirce

The second mythological scene in the southern triclinium is the Punishment of Dirce, which is located on the south wall. This scene depicts Dirce, wife of Lykos, being punished by Amphion and Zethus. Amphion and Zethus were twins born to Antiope, niece of Lykos, after being seduced by Zeus. After the twins were born, Lykos exposed them on Mt. Cithairon, but they were found by a shepherd who took them in. As punishment, Lykos imprisoned Antiope and allowed his wife, Dirce, to treat her cruelly. Eventually Antiope escaped and reunited with her now adult sons but was recaptured by Dirce, who ordered that Antiope be put to death by being dragged by a bull. Amphion and Zethus saved their mother and killed Dirce in the same manner she was going to have their mother put to death.

In the center of the scene is the bull, which ultimately kills Dirce. The bull rears up and lunges forward. Dirce lies below the bull with her arms raised on either side of the bull. A rope circles the bull's body and is tied to Dirce's right wrist. A thyrsos lies to the left of Dirce. On either side of the bull are Amphion and Zethus preparing to release the bull. The brother on the right holds the rope looped around the bull's neck. The brother on the left stands in profile, grasping the rope that circles the bull's body with his right hand and grasping Dirce's right arm with his left.

=== Infant Herakles strangling the snakes ===
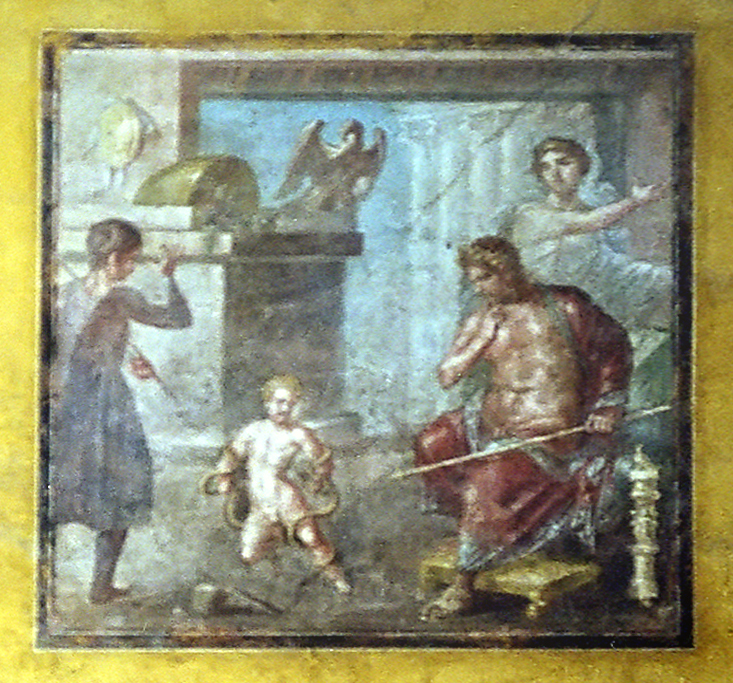
Infant Herakles strangling the snakes

The final mythological scene in the southern triclinium is the Infant Herakles strangling the snakes, located on the north wall. This scene depicts Herakles as a child strangling the snakes sent by Hera to kill him. Herakles is the son of Alkmena and Zeus, Hera's husband. Hera became jealous of this relationship and sets out to kill the product of her husband's affair. She sends two snakes into Herakles' crib, but the child easily averts her efforts by killing the snakes.

This scene depicts the story inside. A portico roof and white ionic columns can be seen in the distance. A large altar is depicted in the background on the left. On top of the altar a fire burns by a gold hood. A green garland is placed in front of the fire. On the right of the altar is the eagle of Zeus. Herakles is in the center of the foreground composition. His right knee is bent and resting on the floor while his left is extended. The snakes twist around Herakles arms and legs. The snakes heads are grasped in Herakles hands. A small wooden club is leaned against a small stone in front of Herakles. On the right is Amphitryon, Alkmena's husband, seated in a throne. Amphitryon's right foot is drawn back and rests on a gold footstool. His left foot rests on the floor. In his left hand he holds a long gold scepter while his right touches his chin as he looks puzzled at Herakles. Behind Amphitryon, Alkmena runs to the right of the scene, terrified. Her arms are extended and her head is turned back to look at Herakles. On the left, a young man, possibly a servant, turns his back to the viewer. He holds a long stick, which leans on his left shoulder. He raises his right hand in astonishment.

=== Wrestling match between Pan and Eros ===
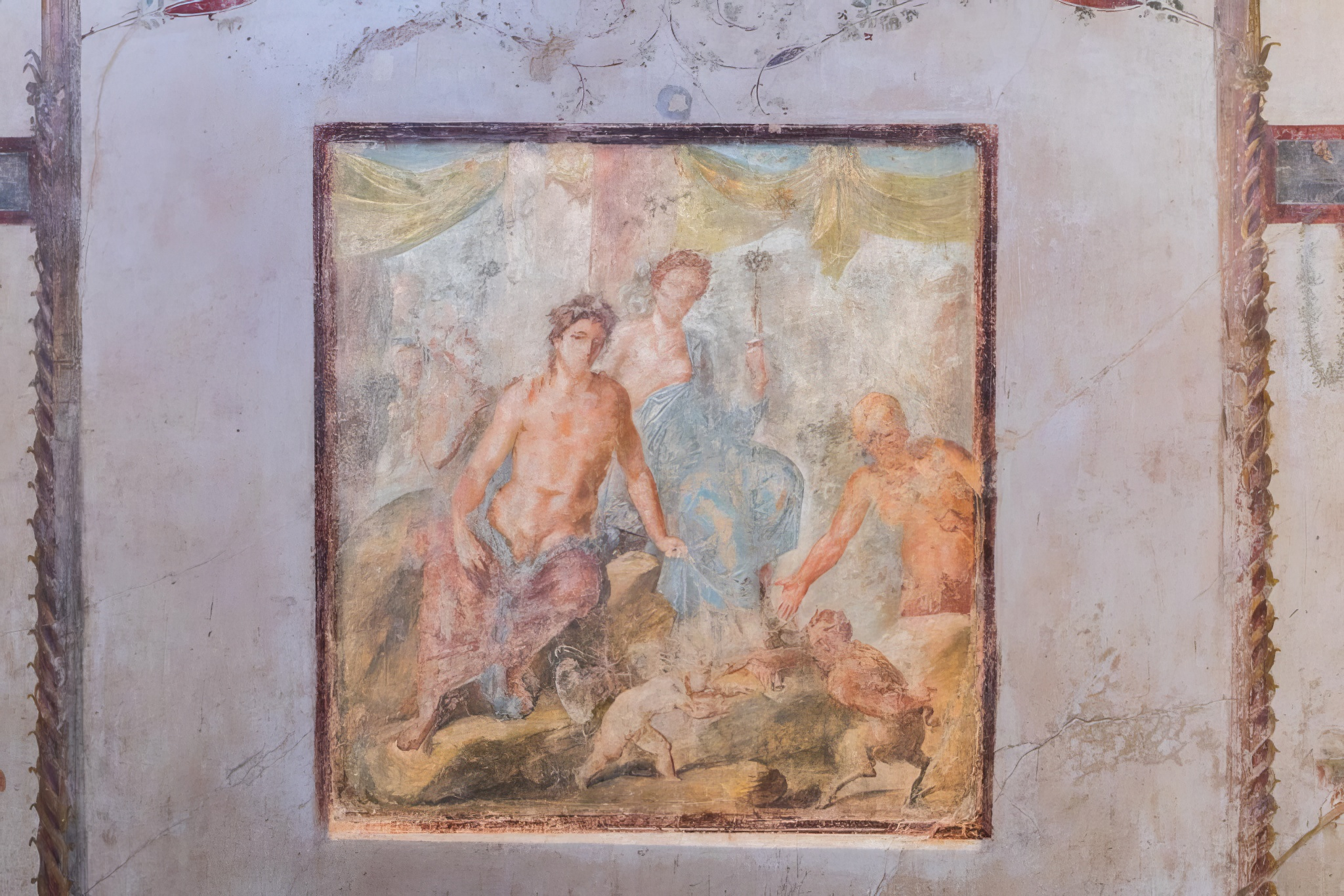
Dionysus and Ariadne watching a fight between Eros and Pan

The mythological scene, Wrestling match between Pan and Eros is located in the south-east triclinium, surrounding the large atrium, on the south wall.

Pan and Eros are not yet fighting in this scene. They stare at each other, in profile. Eros stretches out his arms towards Pan. He is bent over and his legs are spread. Pan poses similarly but only with his right arm raised towards Eros. His left hand is placed behind his back in a handicap. Between Pan and Eros is a large stone. Dionysus watches the two figures at the left of the scene. He is seated in the front, on a rock, leaning with his left arm. In his left hand he holds a thyrsos. His right hand rests on his thigh and holds a gold wreath for the winner. Dionysus wears only a dark-red mantle covering his legs, high brown boots, and ivy leaves in his hair. A kantharos is next to Dionysus' right foot. Behind Dionysus, slightly elevated, is Ariadne. She also watches the contest. She is seated in a three-quarter view. Her right leg is extended and her left is bent and her knee is raised. Ariadne wears a long white garment beneath a light-blue mantle with her breasts and right shoulder and arm exposed. A thyrsos rests between her legs, supported by her left hand. Her right hand rests on Dionysus' shoulder. A satyr stands behind Dionysus, obscured by a stone. The satyr wears a pine wreath and a garment fastened at its right shoulder. On the right side of the scene Silenus holds a pine branch in his left hand and extends his right arm with his palm facing the viewer and Pan and Eros. Silenus is nude except for a red cloth wrapped around his waist and ivy leaves in his hair.

=== Cyparissus ===
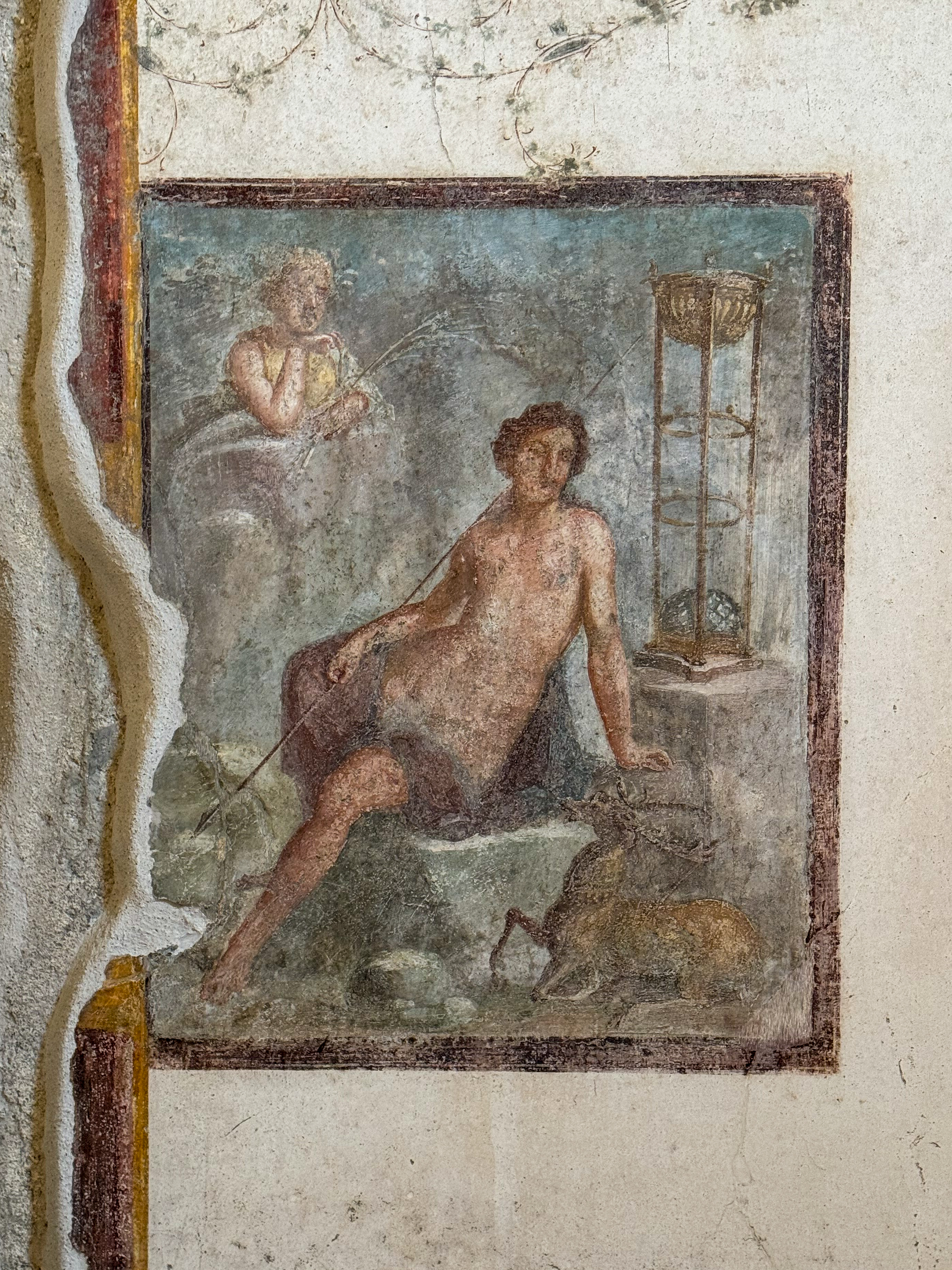
Fresco depicting the metamorphosis of Cyparissus, House of the Vettii.

The final mythological scene in the south-east triclinium is Cyparissus on the north wall. It depicts Cyparissus, Apollo's lover, who was turned into a cypress tree after killing Apollo's beloved stag.

Cyparissus sits in the middle of the scene, seated on a large stone and gazing to the right. His left hand supports his body on the stone while his right rests on his leg and holds a gold scepter. His right leg is bent and his foot drawn back. The only clothing he wears is a purple mantle which covers his right knee and drapes across his left thigh. From his head a cypress cone raises up. To the right of Cyparissus Apollo's gilded tripod is supported on a stone. At the base of the tripod, the omphalos is covered with a net. In front of the stone lies the stag of Apollo with a broken spear protruding from its side. In the background, in the upper left corner, is the upper body of a nymph, watching Cyparissus. She leans her body on a boulder, her right elbow resting on the boulder and her hand supporting her head. In her left hand she holds two branches.

=== Achilles on Skyros ===
The final mythological scene in the south-east triclinium is Achilles on Skyros, painted on the east wall. This scene depicts Achilles stay on the island of Skyros. After learning that Achilles would die during the Trojan War, his mother, Thetis, sent him to live on the island of Skyros. Achilles was disguised as a maiden among Lykomedes daughters. While living on Skyros, Deidameia bore Achilles a son. Odysseus discovers Achilles' concealment and comes to Skyros to reveal Achilles. Odysseus displays gifts in front of the King's daughter, including arms and armor. When a trumpet sounds, Achilles grabs the weapons, revealing his true nature.

The scene depicted is the moment upon which Achilles hears the trumpet and reaches for the weapons, notifying the others who he truly is. Achilles stands in the center of the composition. His upper body is completely lost. Achilles legs are spread wide and the left is bent slightly, seemingly lunging to the right. To the right of the scene Odysseus runs to the left. In his left hand he holds a spear and a sword is strapped to his left side. He wears a white pileus on his head. On the right a female figure, possibly Deidameia, runs to the left with her back to the viewer. She is in the nude except for yellow shoes, gold anklets, and a dark grey mantle that covers her legs. A second female figure stands behind Achilles. Most of her upper body is lost. From what we can see, she runs to the left of the scene. Her right arm is raised with an open palm. A third female figure stands behind Odysseus, she also runs to the left, glancing back at the scene as she runs. In the female's right hand she carries a cylindrical basket and her left hand is raised in alarm. In the background, on the left, a figure wearing a cuirass decorated with a Gorgoneion and blowing a trumpet is able to be seen. The King is depicted behind Achilles.

=== Herakles and Auge ===
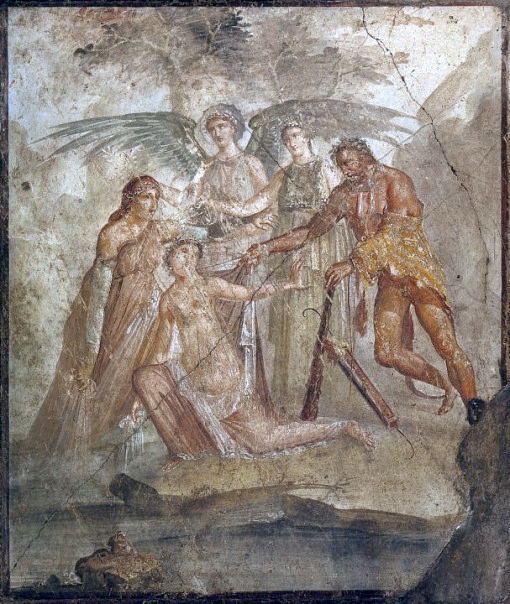
Hercules and Auge from south wall of triclinium "t" (Mau plan)

The only surviving mythological scene in the triclinium next to the small peristyle is Herakles and Auge, painted on the south wall. This scene depicts the myth of the rape of Auge, who was the daughter of the King of Taega and the priestess of Athena, by a drunken Herakles. The union resulted in the conception of Telephus.

Auge crouches on one knee on the bank of a stream in the center of the scene. She lifts the sacred peplos of Athena from the water with a lowered right hand. Her left arm is extended to repeal the obviously drunk Herakles. Herakles leans to the left and his right leg is bent back to indicate him stumbling. He attempts to support himself with his club in his left hand. Herakles wears only a lion skin wrapped around his right arm and draped across his back. With his right hand he grabs an edge of Auge's mantle, which only covers her legs and back. Herakles' bow and quiver hang from a strap on his left wrist. A female companion stands to the left of Auge. She holds an edge of the peplos with her right hand and uses her left hand to ward off Herakles. Behind the three figures are two females. One wears green leaves in her hair and long green garment ornamented with a Gorgoneion. She looks to Auge's companion and raises a kantharos above Auge's head, tilted slightly to be poured. In her left palm she holds a shallow dish or crown. The second figure has large, green, outspread wings and a blue nimbus behind her head. The figure grasps the female companion's outstretched left arm.

=== Ariadne abandoned by Theseus ===
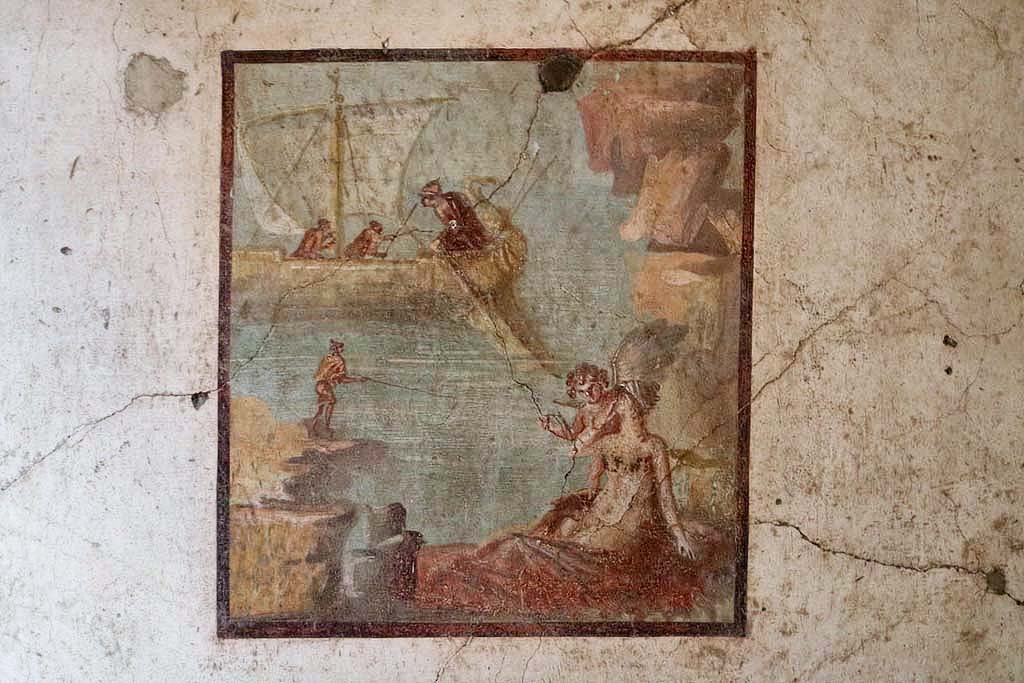
Ariadne being abandoned by Theseus

In the cubiculum next to the large atrium, Ariadne abandoned by Theseus is painted on the north wall. This scene shows Ariadne abandoned by Theseus on the island of Naxos after their flight from Crete due to Theseus killing the Minotaur. The scene Dionysus discovering Ariadne results after this scene.

Ariadne lies on a large red cloth spread on the ground. Her legs are extended to the left and her torso twists towards the viewer. Her left hand touches the red cloth while her right hand is raised to her mouth as she gazes at the retreating ship to the left. Cupid stands behind Ariadne and places his left hand on her left shoulder, pointing with his right hand towards the shop in the left hand section of the scene. The ship is manned by three figures. The first the helmsman and he is seated at the stern, leaning forward slightly, with the rudder in his right hand. This figure is possibly Theseus. Two smaller figures sit on either side of the mast. One holds the oar and the other adjusts the sail. A fisherman stands in the lower left corner.

=== Hero and Leander ===
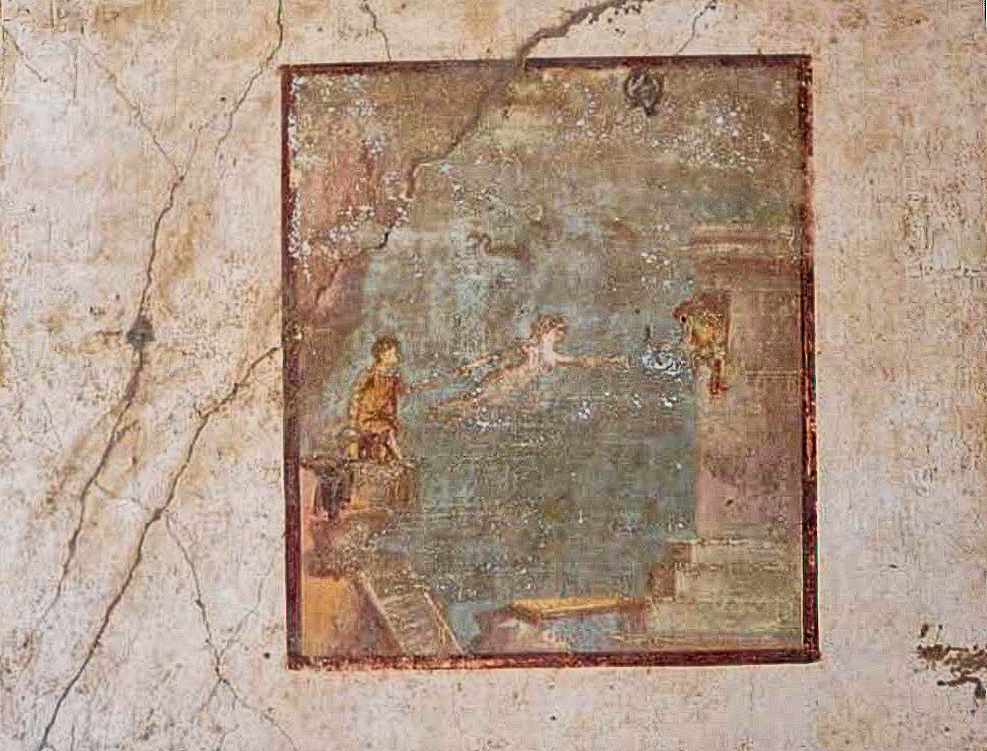
Leander swimming towards his beloved Hero in her tower

On the south wall in the cubiculum is the painting Hero and Leander. This painting depicts the lovers Hero and Leander who lived on opposite shores of the Hellespont. Leander wished to be with his lover so he swam the strait each night, guided by torches Hero placed in a tower on the beach. One night a storm extinguishes the light, causing Leander to drown. Distraught, Hero throws herself into the sea after him.

Leander is depicted in the water, wearing only a wreath of yellow leaves. He swims to the right with his left arm extended towards the circular tower occupying the right section of the painting. Hero leans out of a window of the tower wearing a yellow garment and holding in her right hand, a torch for Leander. On the left hand side of the Hellespont, Leander's servant is seated on a rock. He extends his left arm toward Leander and holds a lantern, which is resting on the rock beside him. A dark garment is draped over a rock to the left of the servant, most likely Leander's clothes. At the base of the scene a ladder is leaned against a rock near the servant. To the right are horizontal planks creating a bridge, leading to the second step of the tower platform. Three dolphins swim above Leander in the composition.

== The owners ==
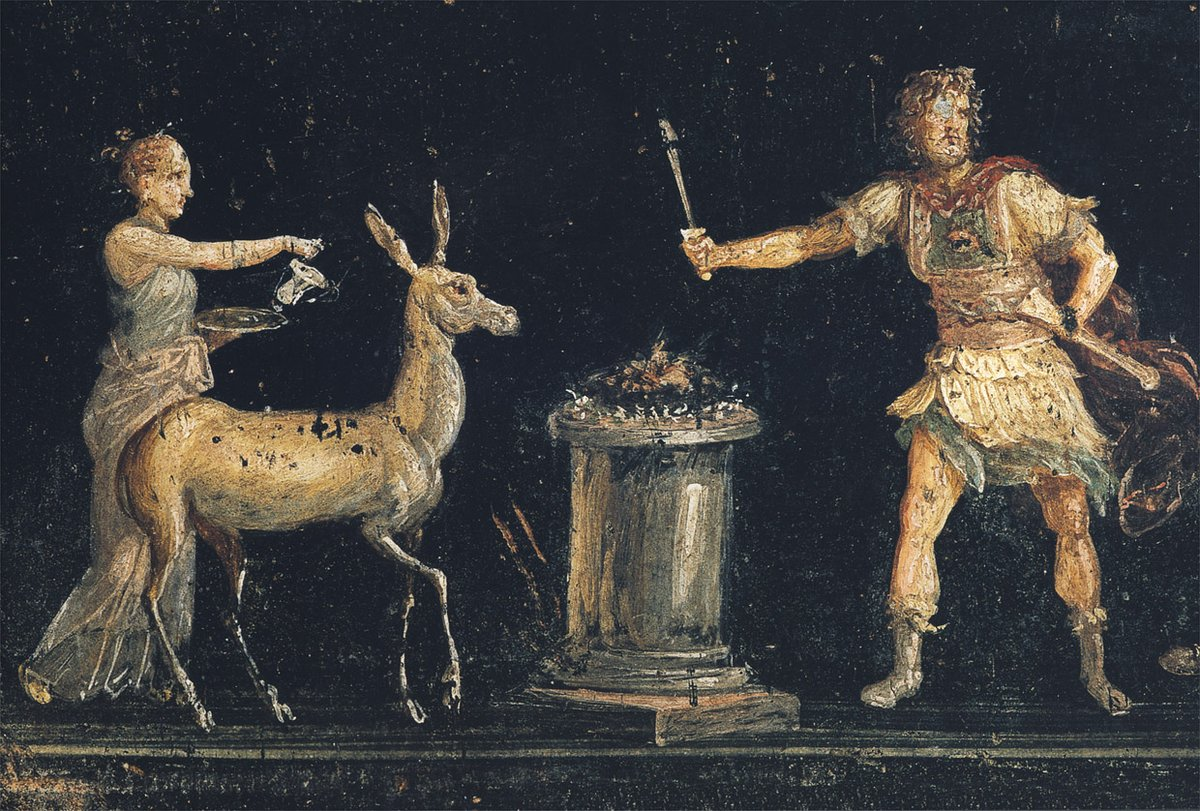
An ancient Fourth-Pompeian-Style Roman wall painting depicting a scene of sacrifice in honor of the goddess Diana; she is seen here accompanied by a deer. The fresco was discovered in the triclinium of House of the Vettii in Pompeii, Italy.

Scholars have determined that the House of the Vettii was owned by former slaves Aulus Vettius Conviva and Aulus Vettius Restitutus. Scholars have come to this conclusion after finding the names on two bronze seals located in the front hall. One of the seals was engraved with 'A. Vetti Restituti' or 'of Aulus Vettius Restitutus'. On the other 'A. Vetti Convivaes' [sic] or 'of Aulus Vettius Conviva' was carved into the seal. Additionally, a ring was found with the initials A. V. C. Further evidence supports the identification of the owners through wax tablets and notices pasted on the outside of the house. Preserved business tablets of Lucius Caecilius list A. Vettius Conviva as a witness. The tablet identifies Conviva as a free man. Other evidence of Conviva's position in Roman society, and incidentally his ownership of the House of the Vettii, is found in the form of graffiti. On the southern facade of the house, he is identified as an Augustalis, a type of priest; this title is mirrored in fragments of a seal ring abbreviated with 'Aug' after his name. Scholars, however, have noted that it cannot be stated with certainty that the Vettii are the owners, despite most believing that they were, due to the limited epigraphical (engraved) evidence. The Vettii family is believed to have been freedmen of the aristocratic family. This belief is rooted in the association of the cognomina, or third given names, Conviva and Restitutus, with servitude, as well as the richness of the decorations in the House of the Vettii. Furthermore, the position of Augustalis was often held by former slaves. The name 'Restitutus' was also commonly a slave name. Scholars have debated the relationship of the two men, many believing they were brothers or fellow slaves. Other theories suggest that Conviva owned the home and Restitutus was a son, brother or freedman, or another important member of the household who inherited the house upon Conviva's passing.
