= Heterodyne (disambiguation) =

Heterodyne refers to a radio signal processing technique.

Heterodyne may also refer to:

- Characters in the anime television series Dai-Guard
- Characters in the webcomic Girl Genius
- Heterodyne (poetry)
- Heterodyne., Hellnear's doujin music circle
- Heterodyne detection
- Optical heterodyne detection
