= G. Wilson Knight =

English literary critic and academic

George Richard Wilson Knight (1897–1985) was an English literary critic and academic, known particularly for his interpretation of mythic content in literature, and The Wheel of Fire, a collection of essays on Shakespeare's plays. He was also an actor and theatrical director, and considered an outstanding lecturer.

== Early life and education ==
Knight was educated at Dean Close School, Dulwich College and, after serving as a dispatch rider in World War I in Iraq, India and Persia, he went up to St Edmund Hall, Oxford, where he read English. He graduated with second-class honours. After Oxford, he went into teaching. From 1923 to 1931 he taught at Hawtreys, Westgate-on-Sea and at Dean Close School, Cheltenham.

The classical scholar William Francis Jackson Knight (1895–1964), of whom he wrote a biography, was his brother.

== Academic career ==
Knight's first academic post was at Trinity College, Toronto in 1931. He taught at Stowe School from 1941 to 1946. In 1946 he became a Reader in English Literature at the University of Leeds. He remained at Leeds as a Professor of English Literature from 1956 until his retirement in 1962.

At Toronto, Knight produced and acted in the main Shakespearian tragedies at Hart House Theatre. Among his other productions are Hamlet at the Rudolf Steiner Theatre, London in 1935; This Sceptred Isle at the Westminster Theatre London in 1941; and at Leeds the Agamemnon of Aeschylus in 1946; Racine's Athalie in 1947; and Timon of Athens in 1948.

== Spiritualism ==
Knight was a believer in spiritualism and was a vice-president for the Spiritualist Association of Great Britain.

== Works ==
- Myth and Miracle: an Essay on the Mystic Symbolism of Shakespeare (1929)
- The Wheel of Fire, Interpretations of Shakespearian Tragedy (1930)
- The Imperial Theme (1931)
- The Shakespearian Tempest (1932)
- The Christian Renaissance, with interpretations of Dante, Shakespeare, and Goethe, and a note on T. S. Eliot (1933)
- Shakespeare and Tolstoy (1934)
- Principles of Shakespeare's Production (1936)
- Atlantic Crossing: an Autobiographical Design (1936)
- The Burning Oracle, Studies in the Poetry of Action (1939)
- The Sceptred Isle: Shakespeare's Message for England at War (1940)
- The Starlit Dome: Studies in the Poetry of Vision (1941)
- Chariot of Wrath: the Message of John Milton to Democracy at War (1942)
- The Olive and the Sword: a Study of England's Shakespeare (1944)
- The Dynasty of Stowe (1945)
- Hiroshima, on Prophecy and the Sun-bomb (1946)
- The Crown of Life: Essays in Interpretation of Shakespeare's Final Plays (1947)
- Christ and Nietzsche: an Essay in Poetic Wisdom (1948)
- The Imperial Theme: Further Interpretations of Shakespeare's Tragedies, including the Roman Plays (1951)
- Lord Byron: Christian Virtues (1952)
- Byron's Dramatic Prose (1953)
- The Last of the Incas, a Play on the Conquest of Peru (1954)
- Laureate of Peace: on the Genius of Alexander Pope (1954)
- The Mutual Flame: on Shakespeare's Sonnets and The Phoenix and the Turtle (1955)
- Lord Byron's Marriage: The Evidence of Asterisks (1957)
- The Sovereign Flower: on Shakespeare as the Poet of Royalism (1958)
- Ibsen (1962)
- The Golden Labyrinth: a Study of British Drama (1962)
- Byron and Hamlet (1962)
- The Saturnian Quest: a Chart of the Prose Works of John Cowper Powys (1964)
- Byron and Shakespeare (1966)
- Gold-Dust, with Other Poetry (1968)
- Shakespeare and Religion: Essays of Forty Years
- Neglected Powers: Essays on 19th and 20th Century Literature (1971)
- Jackson Knight: a Biography (1975)
- Virgil and Shakespeare (1977)
- Shakespeare's Dramatic Challenge: on the Rise of Shakespeare's Tragic Heroes (1977)
- Symbol of Man: on Body-soul for Stage and Studio (1979)
- Shakespearian Dimensions (1984)
- Visions and Vices: Essays on John Cowper Powys (1989)

== See also ==
- Wheel of fire
