= Heterodyne (poetry) =

In poetry, a heterodyne is a word in which the syllable receiving stress and/or pitch change is other than the syllable of longer quantity. This misalignment is considered by most people to be phonetically challenging to recite, and when applied sporadically to several words in succession, it usually attracts the listener's attention to a higher degree than the more natural-sounding blend of meter and stress/pitch.

Only languages with a separate quantitative element can make substantial use of heterodynes, and people primarily refer to the poetry of classical languages when evoking the term.

The term was coined by W. F. Jackson Knight in 1939, in reference to heterodyne radio waves.
