= Wheel of fire =

Sequence of consequences in literature

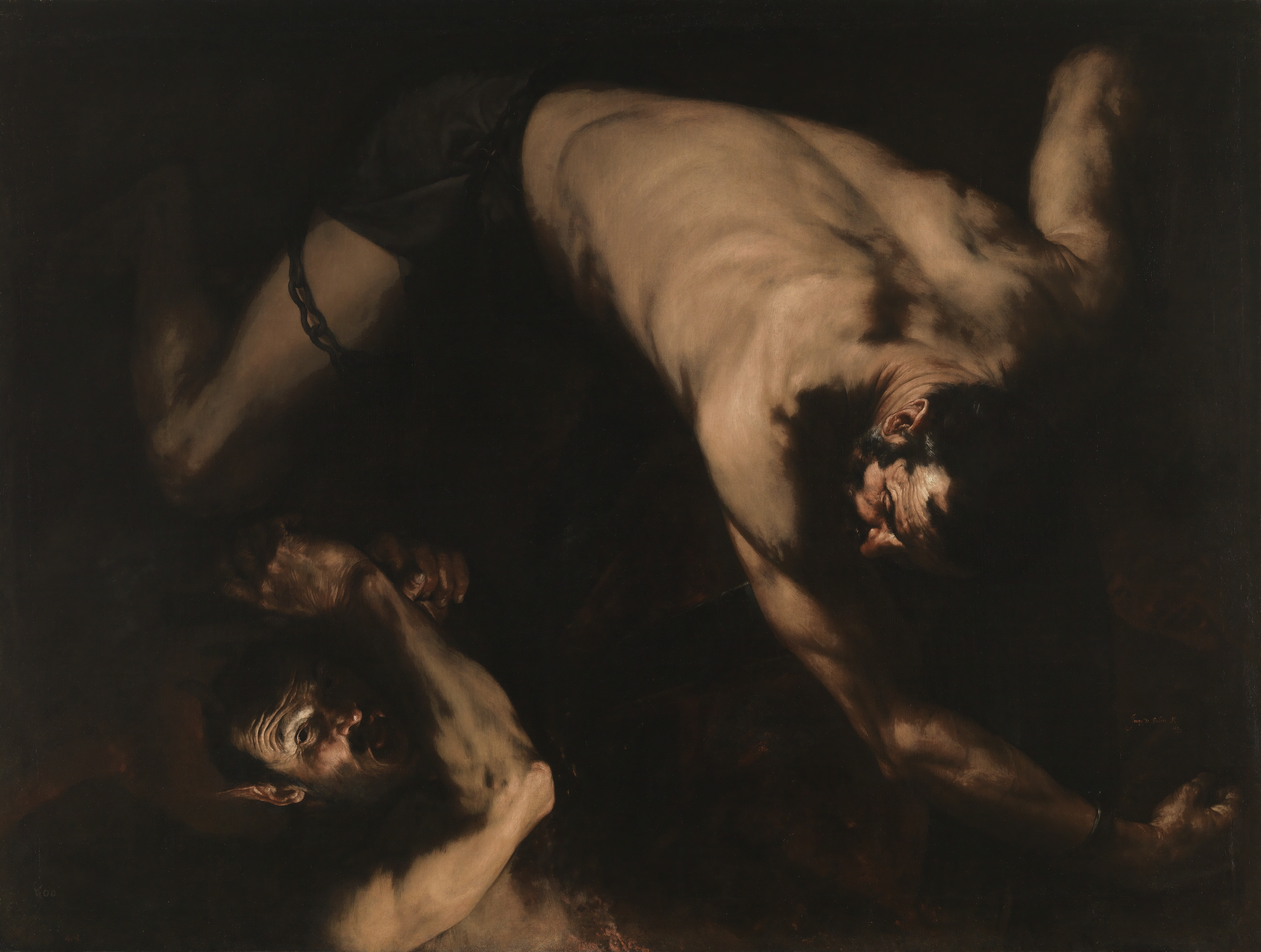
José Ribera's grittily realistic Ixion, 1632 (Museo del Prado).

In a literary context, a wheel of fire may refer to the chain of tortuous or dire consequences that result from a single action.

== In mythology ==
The Wheel of Fire originates in Greek mythology as the punishment for Ixion, who was bound to a wheel of fire for lusting after Zeus's wife, Hera.

== In literature ==
The Wheel of Fire is part of the Aristotelian reading of a tragedy (e.g., plays), which includes the central flaw within a character. In Shakespeare's tragedy Othello, the flaw in Othello himself is his vulnerability to jealousy and his tendency to believe Iago, who is manipulating Othello into believing his wife is unfaithful. As a result of this flaw Othello loses a loyal friend, murders his wife, and is driven insane before eventually committing suicide. In this scenario the Wheel of Fire begins with the action of Othello trusting Iago and consequently the other events occur.

The Wheel of Fire is most commonly applied to the protagonist within a tragedy (i.e. the hero) and may aim to provoke sympathy from the audience when the hero falls from grace (this purging of emotions is known as catharsis), though it also adds dramatic interest to the performance.

The Wheel of Fire is also the title of G. Wilson Knight's book on Shakespearean tragedy.

In Shakespeare's King Lear, Lear states: "But I am bound upon a wheel of fire, / That mine own tears do scald like molten lead".

=== In Tolkien ===
In J. R. R. Tolkien's The Lord of the Rings the One Ring is described as a "wheel of fire".

Sam, and there is no veil between me and the wheel of fire. I begin to see it even with my waking eyes, and all else fades.

— Frodo Baggins to Samwise Gamgee (chapter "Mount Doom" in The Return of the King)

Also:

A crouching shape, scarcely more than the shadow of a living thing, a creature now wholly ruined and defeated, yet filled with a hideous lust and rage; and before it stood stern, untouchable now by pity, a figure robed in white, but at its breast it held a wheel of fire.

— A description of Gollum and Frodo, respectively, as seen by Samwise.

== See also ==
- Catherine wheel (firework)
- Breaking wheel
- Hamartia
