= W. F. Jackson Knight =

English classical scholar

William Francis Jackson Knight (1895–1964) was a classical scholar and teacher.

Knight "loved Virgil, and he communicates his love even to those who cannot agree with his method; he must have done more than many greater scholars have done towards making Virgil's poetry (and with it the Latin language) live and move for all kinds of readers. He seems, in his Virgilianism, always to have been stretching out his hands in longing for some further shore; he makes us conscious that such a shore exists, even though we may not travel in his company" (R. G. Austin).

== Early life ==
W.F. Jackson Knight ("Jack/Jackson/J.K.") was born in Sutton in Surrey on 20 October 1895, the son of George Knight and his wife, Caroline Louisa Jackson.

He was educated at Kingswood House, a preparatory school in Epsom, as a day boy, before going on to Dulwich College. He was elected to one of two Open Classical Scholarships at Hertford College, Oxford in December 1913.

Great Britain having entered the First World War in August 1914, Knight volunteered for full-time military service and was attested in the Royal Engineers at Kingston-on-Thames on 1 November 1915. He was posted to the Motorcyclist Company, Signal Depot, Royal Engineers at Dunstable, trained, and posted to the British Expeditionary Force in France, where he landed on 21 December 1915. He served on operations in France and Flanders as a Motorcyclist Corporal, mustered as despatch rider, until he returned to England to undergo officer training in 1917. He was discharged from the Army to take up a temporary commission on 21 August 1917. Commissioned temporary Second Lieutenant, Royal Engineers, on 22 August 1917, he returned to France, where he continued to serve on operations until wounded in action in the summer of 1918, arranging signals equipment in the front line on the Somme. He was evacuated to England for treatment in August 1918, being admitted to Epsom Hospital.

"The wounds were bad. 'Dressings ripped off behind my knee' 18' (i.e. 1918), he wrote (1951), 'the orderly fainted, visu exsanguis!—gave me bad moments.' Amputation was at first expected ... but the leg was saved. There was considerable suffering with shell-shock."

Knight survived the war and was eventually demobilised and released from the army, retaining the rank of Lieutenant, in January 1920. Thereafter he "always carried a stick, having been very seriously wounded ... . More often than not he carried it under his arm, and this often caused it to come in contact with passers-by."

Despite his keen appetite for soldiering, Knight had an unusual perspective on the war, "It was such a frightfully dressy affair ... Not only the generals, but their ADC's and all the junior staff officers wore gorget patches on their lapels."

== Teaching career ==
After some months teaching at a preparatory school and a cramming establishment, Knight returned to Hertford College, Oxford in September 1920. Having taken a Second in Greats in 1922, he was appointed to the staff of All Saints' School, Bloxham in Oxfordshire in 1925. His time at Bloxham was memorable chiefly for his impact on the school cadet corps: First appointed as a Lieutenant, Officers Training Corps, General List, Territorial Army, for service with the Bloxham School Contingent, Junior Division, Officers Training Corps, in October 1925, he was promoted to captain and assumed command of the unit in November 1926. He achieved a considerable reputation for turning the Contingent into one of the best units of its kind in the United Kingdom, and received official recognition for himself and the school in being promoted to Brevet Major when he relinquished command with effect from 1 January 1932.

He left Bloxham School, after ten years' service, in July 1935.

== Classical scholar and academic ==
During this period Knight had started to become more and more active in classical scholarship: "In the early nineteen-thirties, readers of the learned journals in both Britain and the United States became aware of the work of a classical scholar called WFJ Knight, writing from Bloxham School in Oxfordshire. The articles were not only numerous, erudite, and very wide-ranging; they were also, in more ways than one, distinctly original" (Wiseman). In 1932, for example, he published "Magical Motives in Seneca's Troades" in The Transactions and Proceedings of the American Philological Association and the book, Vergil's Troy: Essays on the 2nd Book of the Aeneid.

Having left Bloxham in 1935, he spent a short time as a temporary lecturer in the University of St. Andrews, and then, in January 1936 accepted an appointment as Assistant Lecturer in Classics at the University College of South West England in Exeter.

Once arrived, he was also made Warden of Great Duryard House, one of the College Halls of Residence (afterwards Thomas Hall). And – despite "strenuous opposition from some students," he founded and took temporary command of the University College (Exeter) Contingent, Senior Division, Officers' Training Corps, in November 1936.

He was appointed Reader in Classical Literature in 1942.

Notwithstanding the pressures of change in his personal circumstances and academic duties, he published a major work, Cumaean Gates in 1936, of which it has been said, "Knight had little gift for sustained and coherent argument and exposition, and he could, under the influence of whatever book or article he had just been reading, write what can only be described as nonsense. Yet he was a remarkable man, who certainly widened the knowledge and the sensibilities of readers of Virgil; and ... he had a power to stimulate and inspire which is not given to many classical scholars" (M.L. Clarke).

Cumaean Gates was followed by Accentual Symmetry in Vergil in 1939, Roman Vergil in 1944, and St. Augustine's De Musica: A Synopsis in 1949.

Knight (who always preferred to spell the Roman author's name as "Vergil"), helped to found, and was appointed as an honorary Joint Secretary of, the Virgil Society in 1943. He served as President of the Society during 1949–1950.

He was elected as a Fellow of the Royal Society of Literature in 1945 and as an Honorary Life Member of the International Mark Twain Society (USA) in 1946, and he attended, and played a prominent role in, the constituent assembly of the Sodalitas Erasmiana in Rome in September 1949.

1950 was a very significant year in Knight's life. On 8 July 1950 his beloved mother, Mrs. Caroline Louisa Knight, died. The following month Knight flew to South Africa, where he visited and lectured at the University of the Witwatersrand. He also visited Cape Town, and lectured at the University of Cape Town. His friend Theodore Johannes Haarhoff, Professor of Classics in the University of the Witwatersrand, subsequently wrote that his visit 'was a great success although he was a difficult guest.' (quoted in Gosling)

The following year, 1951, he began work on what is arguably his most famous work, the Penguin Classics edition of The Aeneid, which was eventually published in 1956 as Virgil: The Aeneid: A New Translation.

But his scholarly reputation was now increasingly tarnished by his spiritualism. "The most astonishing part of Knight's life was his concern with spiritualism. ... When he began his Penguin Aeneid translation, T.J. Haarhoff, 'who had for years claimed spirit-contacts with Vergil himself ... now put his powers at Jack's service'... . Vergil visited Haarhoff 'every Tuesday evening' and wrote out answers to questions raised by Knight, whom Vergil regularly called 'Agrippa.' 'He still does,' writes Haarhoff in January 1968 ... . Vergil then began to contact Knight 'directly at Exeter' warning him 'to go slow and be extra careful about the "second half."' Knight gratefully dedicated his translation to Haarhoff. After Knight's death ... Haarhoff [was] assured by a medium that 'Vergil met him when he went over' (Calder)

== Retirement and death ==
Knight retired from Exeter University in 1961, and died, aged 69 years, in Frenchay Hospital in Bristol on 4 December 1964. He never married.

Jackson Knight left a strong impression on people. Cecil Day-Lewis, afterwards Poet Laureate, remembered his first meeting with him in the nineteen thirties: "a dapper, dandyish figure, a high-pitched voice — which later I was to describe as 'the sound of a demented seagull', and alternating of enthusiasm with moodiness." Day-Lewis was himself a translator of The Aeneid, rendering it in modern English verse, comparable to Vergil's original, unlike Jackson Knight's modern English prose.

== Biography ==
Jackson Knight's younger brother, the English literary critic George Wilson Knight, wrote a biography of him in 1975: Jackson Knight: A Biography (Alden Press, Oxford 1975).

== Published works (excluding occasional papers and articles) ==
- Vergil's Troy: Essays on the Second Book of the Aeneid, Oxford: Basil Blackwell, 1932
- Cumaean Gates: A Reference to the Sixth Aeneid to the Initiation Pattern, Oxford: Basil Blackwell, 1936. With drawings by L. J. Lloyd.
- Accentual Symmetry in Vergil, Oxford: Basil Blackwell, 1939
- Roman Vergil, London: Faber and Faber, 1944; 2nd ed.: November 1944; revised edition: Harmondsworth, Middlesex: Penguin Books, 1966 (Peregrine, Y54)
- St. Augustine's De Musica: A Synopsis, London: The Orthological Institute, 1949
- Vergil. Selections from the Eclogues, Georgics and Aeneid, London: George Allen & Unwin, 1949 (The Roman World)
- Virgil: The Aeneid: A New Translation, Penguin Books, 1956 (Penguin Classics)
- Vergil: Epic and Anthropology, comprising Vergil's Troy, Cumaean Gates, and The Holy City of the East, New York: Barnes & Noble, 1967 (reprint)
- Elysion: On Ancient Greek and Roman Beliefs concerning a Life after Death, London: Rider, 1970
