= Tiberius Claudius Verus =

Tiberius Claudius Verus (fl. 60s AD) was a local politician in Pompeii. He held the magistracy of duovir in 62 AD, when an earthquake devastated the city on February 5.

Claudius Verus lived near or along the Via di Nola. For the purposes of historical and archaeological study, Pompeii is divided into nine regions, each of which contains numbered blocks (insulae); Verus lived on the block designated IX.8, IX.9, V.3 or V.4, as indicated by several inscriptions that preserve campaign advertising displayed by neighbors who supported his candidacy. One of his neighbors recommended him as an "upright young man." Several interrelated inscriptions show that Verus was part of a group of men who supported each other's political careers. None comes from an "old" Pompeiian family, and each has a gens name that is well attested at Rome and either Puteoli or Delos. They are associated with some of the largest houses in Pompeii, and their wealth suggests commercial interests. It is possible that Verus and his faction were imperial freedmen.

Verus's praenomen and nomen indicate that the Tiberii Claudii would have been his traditional patrons. Just before the earthquake, Verus had been organizing games (ludi) in honor of Nero, to be held February 25 and 26. Among the planned festivities were a hunt (venatio), athletic games, and either "sprinklings of scented water to refresh the crowd" or distributions of money (sesterces): the inscription has been read both ways. No gladiators were advertised; gladiatorial contests had been banned in Pompeii in 59 AD, following a riot in the amphitheatre. Although the earthquake most likely caused the cancellation of the games, they may have been presented in some form for the sake of restoring morale.

In the early decades following the discovery of the luxurious House of the Centenary in 1879, August Mau proposed that Verus had been its owner. It has also been argued that the Centenary's owner was Aulus Rustius Verus, with Claudius Verus living in an otherwise unidentified house at V.3. No scholarly consensus exists on Claudius Verus's address.
