= Giuseppe Fiorelli =

Italian archaeologist (1823-1896)

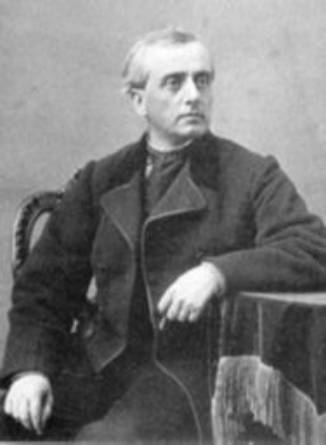
Giuseppe Fiorelli

Giuseppe Fiorelli (7 June 1823 – 28 January 1896) was an Italian archaeologist. He is known for his excavations at Pompeii which helped preserve the city.

== Biography ==
Fiorelli was born on 7 June 1823 in Naples. His initial work at Pompeii was completed in 1848. He was then imprisoned for some time because his radical approach to archaeology and strong nationalist feelings landed him in trouble with the king of Naples, Ferdinand II. During his time as a political prisoner, he produced a three volume work entitled History of Pompeian Antiques (1860–64). He subsequently became professor of archaeology at Naples University and director of excavations (1860–75), serving concurrently as director of the Naples National Archaeological Museum from 1863.

With the unification of Italy in 1860, the legal status of Pompeii changed from being a royal possession from which monarchs could use the site to obtain antiquities for their private collections or to gift artifacts to illustrious foreign guests, to property of the state. Fiorelli was named superintendent and he began to manage the excavations to transform Pompeii into a place to visit to gain a glimpse into the past of western civilization and begin to understand those who went before the modern world. Fiorelli developed an address system to identify each structure within the ancient city. Then he focused on copying and cataloging the frescoes left in situ.

In 1870, Fiorelli commissioned Geremia Discanno to begin copying the frescoes being unearthed in Pompeii. In Fiorelli's "The excavations of Pompeii from 1861 to 1872" published in 1873, more than fifty of Discanno's meticulous drawings made between 1870 and 1872 are listed.

As director of the Pompeii excavation Fiorelli introduced an entirely new system for the project. Instead of uncovering the streets first, in order to excavate the houses from the ground floor up, he imposed a system of uncovering the houses from the top down — a better way of preserving everything that was discovered. In this way the data collected during the excavations could be used to help with the restoration of the ancient buildings and of their interiors — although the most important wall paintings and mosaics still continued to be stripped and transported to Naples. Fiorelli also took the topography of the town and divided it into a system of 'regiones', 'insulae' and 'domus,' a form of reference still in use today.

Fiorelli is best known for his plaster casts (calchi), produced by a process named after him: the Fiorelli process. He realized that where a corpse or other organic material had been buried in ash, it had rotted over time, leaving a cavity. Whenever an excavator discovered such a cavity, plaster of Paris was poured in and left to harden. The ash around the plaster was then carefully removed, so that a plaster replica of a person or animal at the moment of their death remained. This process gave information about how people had died in the eruption, what they were doing in their final moments and what sort of clothing they wore.

Fiorelli was notable for his welcoming attitude to foreign scholars. He founded a training school where foreigners as well as Italians could learn archaeological technique, and made a particular study of the materials and building methods used in Pompeii. During his tenure many notable scholars came to study the remains of Pompeii. These included August Mau, in 1882, who created a system for categorizing the Pompeian pictures into a range of decorative styles. Mau's work still provides the standard framework for the study of these ancient Roman paintings.

In 1875 Fiorelli became director general of Italian Antiquities and Fine Arts, serving in this position until his death two decades later. His work at Pompeii was continued by Michele Ruggiero, Giulio De Petra, Ettore Pais and Antonio Sogliano, who began to restore the roofs of the houses with wood and tiles in order to protect the remaining wall paintings and mosaics inside.

Fiorelli died on 28 January 1896 in Naples.

== Works ==
- "Osservazioni sopra talune monete rare di città greche",
- Monete inedite dell'Italia antica, Napoli 1845, 22, n.9.
- "Pompeianarum Antiquitatum Historia", la storia degli scavi di Pompei (1860 - 1864)
- Catalogo del Museo Nazionale di Napoli: Medagliere, Vol. I, Monete Greche, Naples National Archaeological Museum, 1870
- Catalogo del Museo Nazionale di Napoli: Collezione Santangelo. Napoli, 1866-67.
- Descrizione di Pompei, 1875
- Guida di Pompei, Roma (Tipografia Elzeviriana) 1887, p. 112
