= House of the Centenary =

Preserved building in Pompeii, Italy

Coordinates: 40.7521°N 14.4880°E

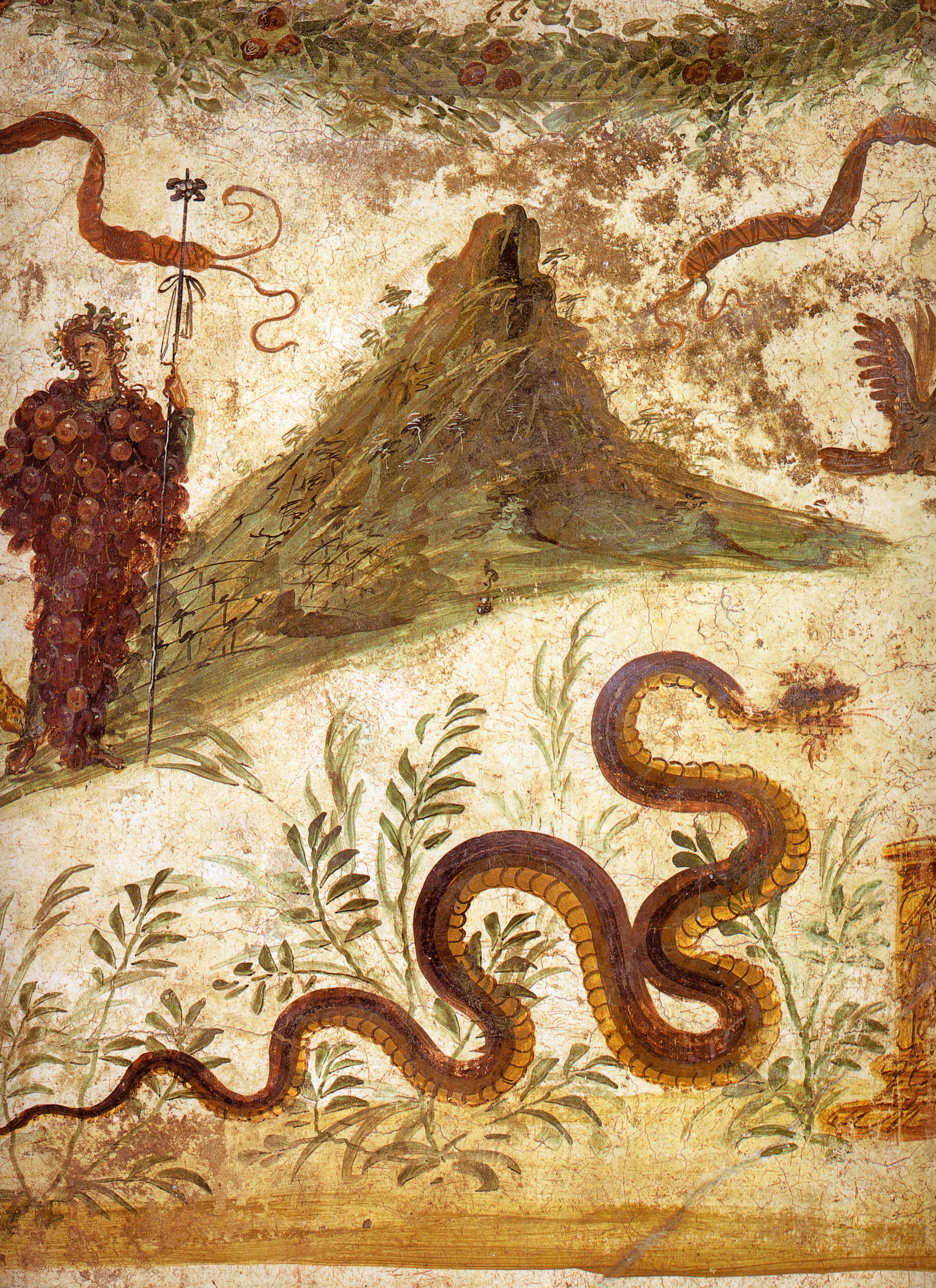
A wall painting in the House of the Centenary features the earliest known representation of Vesuvius

The House of the Centenary (Italian Casa del Centenario, also known as the House of the Centenarian) was the house of a wealthy resident of Pompeii, preserved by the eruption of Mount Vesuvius in 79 AD. The house was discovered in 1879, and was given its modern name to mark the 18th centenary of the disaster. Built in the mid-2nd century BC, it is among the largest houses in the city, with private baths, a nymphaeum, a fish pond (piscina), and two atria. The Centenary underwent a remodeling around 15 AD, at which time the bath complex and swimming pool were added. In the last years before the eruption, several rooms had been extensively redecorated with a number of paintings.

Although the identity of the house's owner eludes certainty, arguments have been made for either Aulus Rustius Verus or Tiberius Claudius Verus, both local politicians.

Among the varied paintings preserved in the House of the Centenary is the earliest known depiction of Vesuvius, as well as explicit erotic scenes in a room that may have been designed as a private "sex club".

== Site and features ==
For the purposes of archaeological and historical study, Pompeii is divided into nine regions, each of which contains numbered blocks (insulae). Within a block, doorways are numbered in clockwise or counter-clockwise order; the Centenary is numbered IX.8.3–6. It belongs to the luxurious "tufa" period of Pompeiian architecture, characterized by the use of fine-grained gray volcanic tufa that was quarried around Nuceria.

Of the two atria, the grander one leads to the most highly decorated rooms. The smaller atrium might have been for private family and service access. The triclinium or dining room was situated so that the guest of honor could view the enclosed garden. The dining room itself was decorated with vertical stalks entwined with tendrils on which birds perch, with leaf-adorned candelabra in the panels between. The house had its own bakery, located in a cellar under the service quarters on the west side.

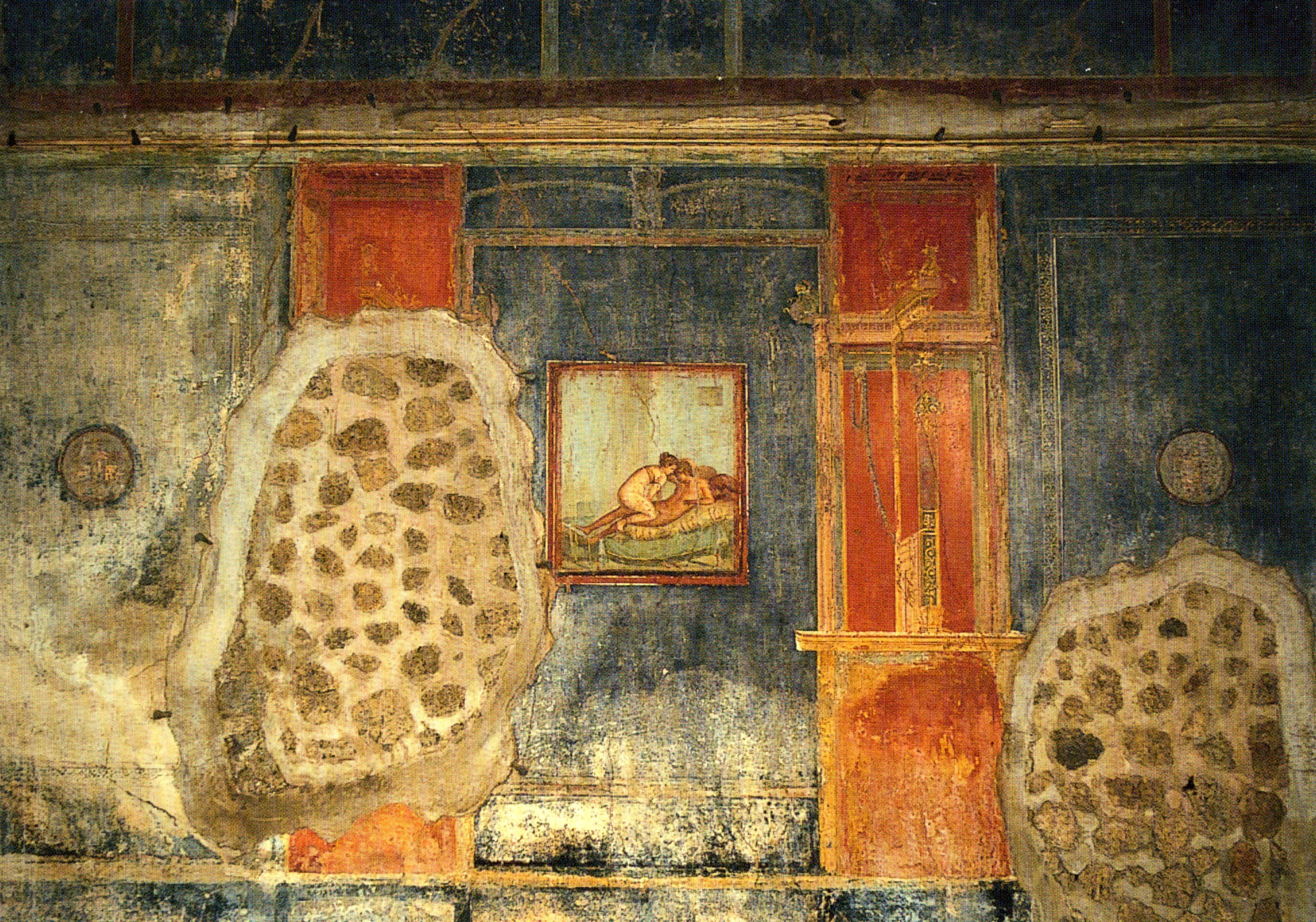
Erotic painting on the wall of the "sex club", with damage revealing brickwork under the painted panels

A graffito in the latrine uses the rare word cacaturit ("wants to shit") found also once in the Epigrams of Martial. Another records a slave's bid for freedom: "Officiosus escaped on November 6 in the consulate of Drusus Caesar and M. Junius Silanus" (15 AD).

It has been suggested that one secluded room (numbered 43), which was decorated with explicit scenes of female-male intercourse, functioned as a private "sex club." Guests would have entered the smaller, more private atrium, then passed down a corridor and through a triclinium and antechamber to reach it. A few similar rooms in Pompeiian houses suggest that the intention was to create the ambience of a brothel in a home, for parties at which participants played the roles of prostitute or client, or for which actual prostitutes were hired to entertain guests. A small opening oddly positioned in the wall may have been an aperture for voyeurism. Other scholars categorize Room 43 simply as a bedroom (cubiculum), which often featured erotic imagery, and find it unnecessary to conclude that sexual entertainment was offered to guests there.

== Art ==
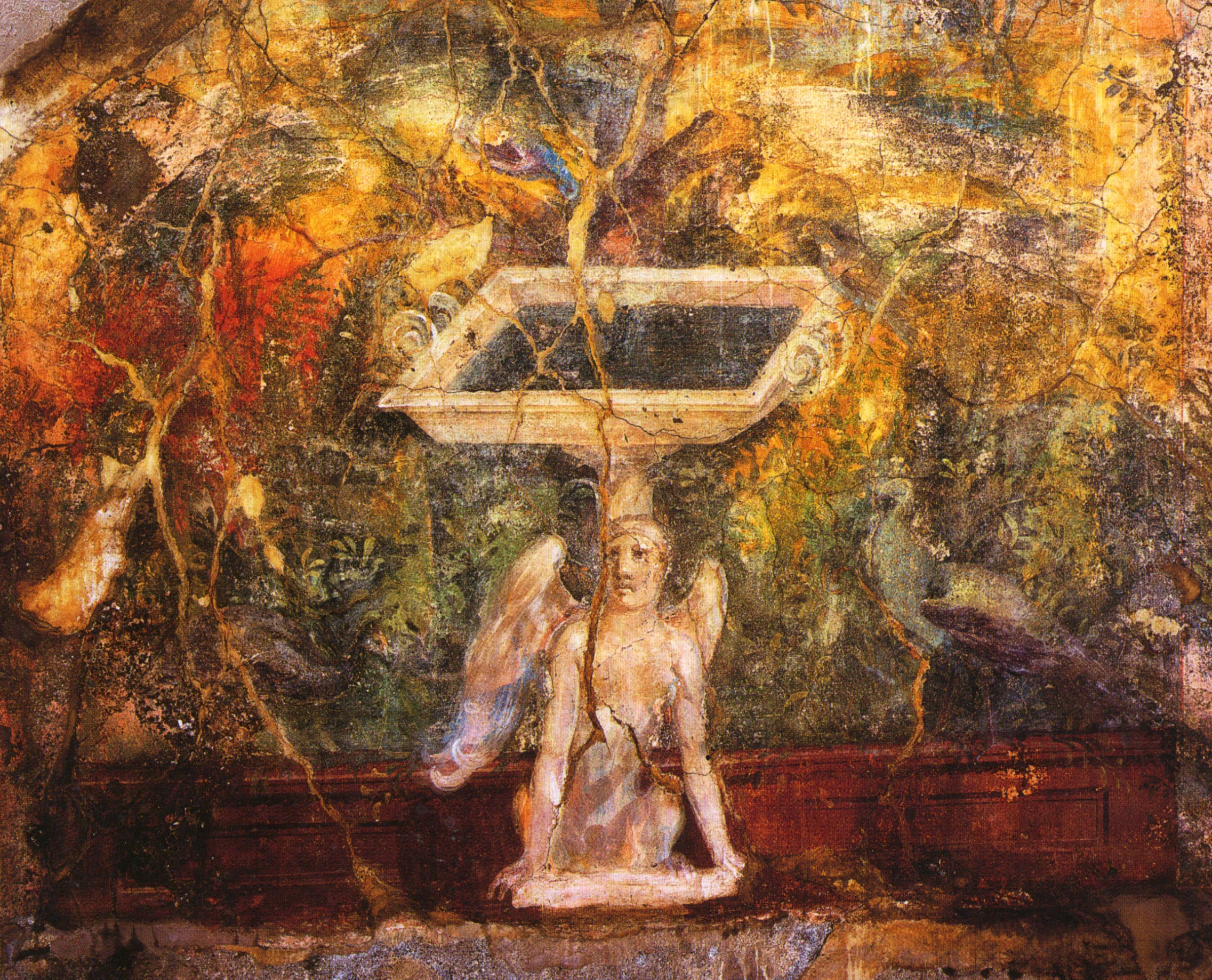
Painting of a fountain, from the nymphaeum

The House of the Centenary is known for its large and diverse collection of paintings in the Third and Fourth Pompeiian styles. The garden nymphaeum is a particularly rich example of combining painting with architectural elements to create the ambience of a country villa. A body of water filled with a variety of fish and marine animals was "dramatically" painted on the parapet that encircled the four walls of the nymphaeum; several species are represented accurately enough to identify. The lower part of the wall is painted to look like a balustrade with ivy growing on it, with birds and lizards below. Fountains with sphinx bases are painted within garden scenes to the sides, and the wall around the entrance depicts game parks; in the foreground is a real fountain, with a faux finish to look like rare marble, from which the water would have run down tiers into a basin. Below the steps and above the garden pool, there was a painting of a river god crowned with reeds, no longer visible. The composition has been characterized as a "grotesque potpourri", an assemblage of elements desirable because they represent the country villa lifestyle. Here and in similarly decorated spaces in Pompeii, the owner is concerned with displaying size and quantity and not a harmonious whole.

The room to the north of the peristyle featured delicate ivy and stylized flowering vines as decoration. Ducks and lotus leaves also appear together as decorative motifs. Grapes and viticulture appear throughout the house, as in a scene of cupids gathering grapes. The hunting paintings are by the Pompeiian painter Lucius.

=== Mythological painting ===
Mythological subjects include Theseus as victor over the Minotaur, Hermaphroditus and Silenus, Hercules and Telephus, and of Orestes and Pylades before Thoas. Another room features Selene and Endymion, a Venus Piscatrix ("Venus the Fisherwoman"), and "floating nymphs."

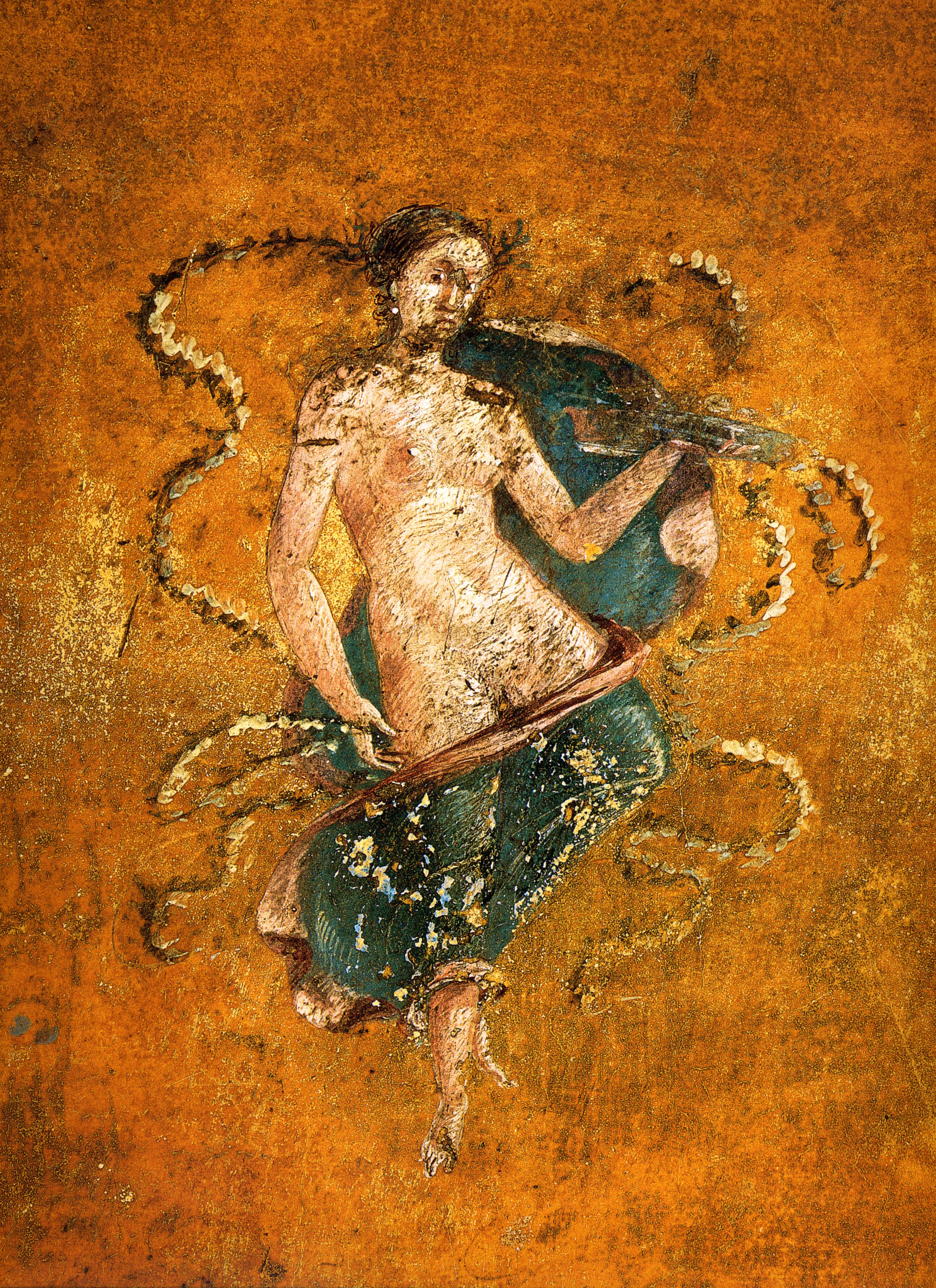
Floating maenad

==== Bacchus and Vesuvius ====
A painting in the house's lararium, a shrine to the household gods the Lares, depicts Vesuvius as it may have looked before the eruption, with a single vineyard-covered peak instead of the double-peak profile of today. Although some scholars reject the single-peak hypothesis, the painting is generally regarded as the earliest known representation of the volcano, even if it should not be taken as a record of what Vesuvius actually looked like.

Literary sources also describe Vesuvius as covered in grape vines before the eruption. Plutarch says that vines had grown on it in the 1st century BC, when Spartacus and his fellow slaves had taken refuge there and cut them down to make rope ladders. The description by the poet Martial evokes the painting, which shows vines on the slopes in quincunx arrangement:

Here Vesuvius is shaded green with vines; here the noble grape had exuded its juices in vats: these are the ridges which Bacchus loved more than the hills of Nysa.

The unusual depiction of Bacchus gives him a body composed of grapes, which may represent either the Aminaea variety grown in the area or the eponymous Pompeianum. He carries a thyrsus and has a panther at his feet. In the foreground is a crested and bearded serpent that embodies the Agathodaemon or Genius.

=== Theatre allusions ===
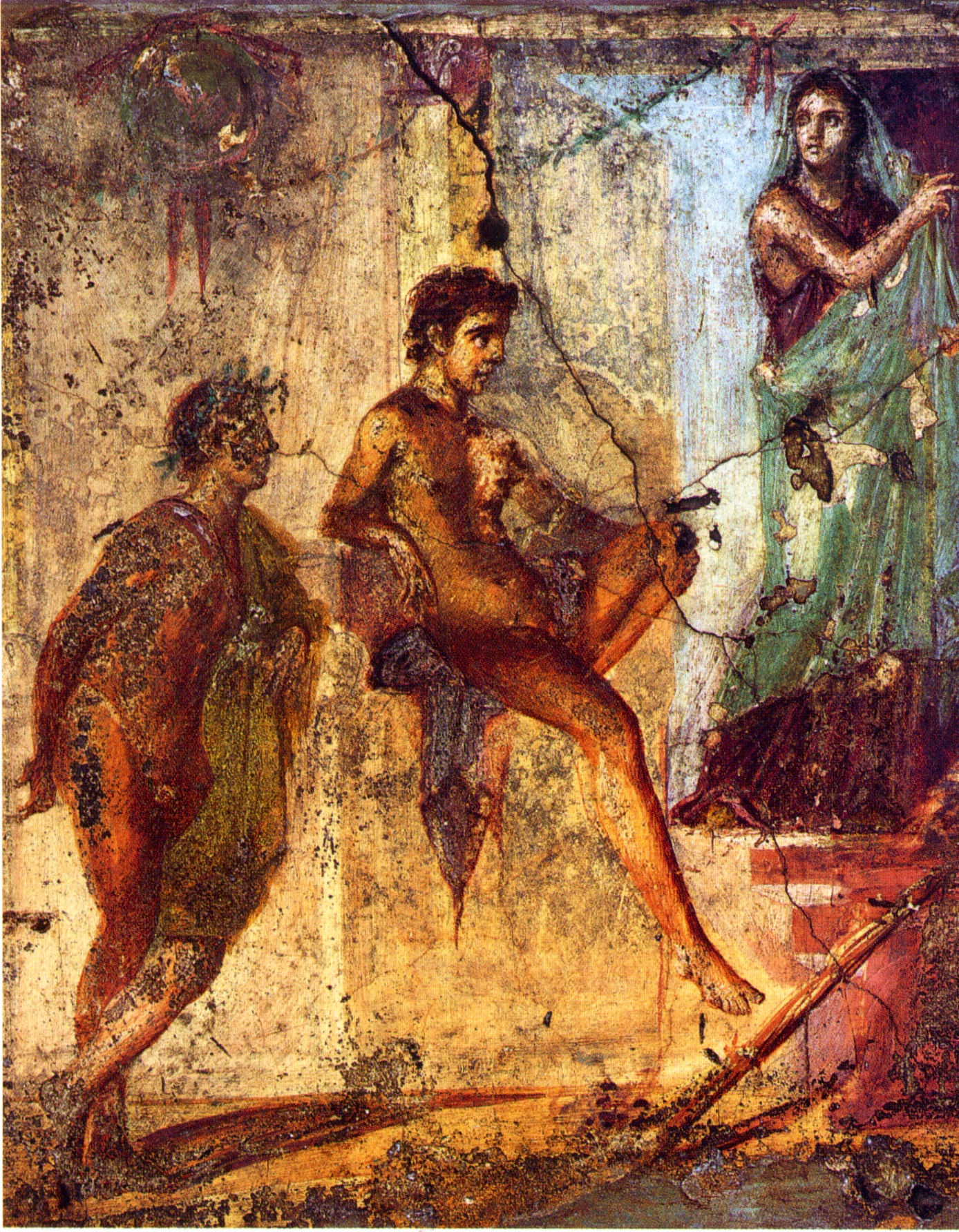
Scene from Iphigenia in Tauris

Some of the mythological paintings, including one of Medea, are thought to represent scenes from the theatre. The painting of Hercules may be a scene from the Hercules Furens of either Seneca or Euripides; the other figures would thus be Amphitryon, Megara, and Lycus. A scene from Iphigenia in Tauris shows Pylades, Orestes, and Iphigenia.

Another theatrical reference is found in a graffito scrawled on the wall between the tepidarium (a bath maintained at a pleasantly warm temperature) and the caldarium (an environment more like a steam bath). Reading histrionica Actica, "Actica the pantomime," the phrase has been interpreted as a record of fan infatuation, and perhaps an indication that the house hosted performances by theatre troupes.

=== Erotic scenes ===
Pompeiian bedrooms were not infrequently decorated with scenes referring to sex, sometimes explicitly human, and sometimes allusive and mythological.

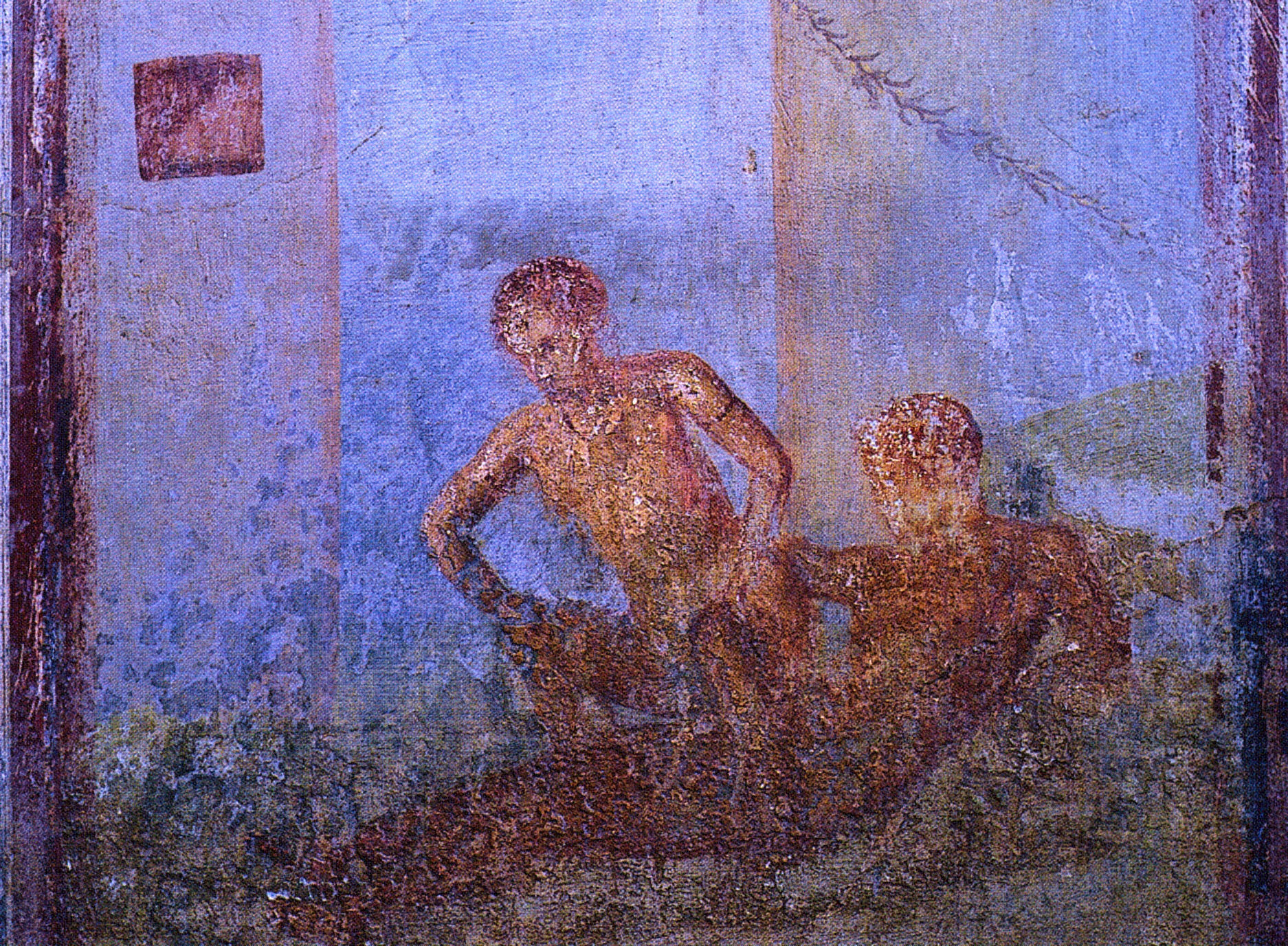
Painting illustrating the uncommon "reverse upright Venus" position

One bedroom at the Centenary features a pair of scenes referring to love affairs between a mortal and a divinity: Selene and Endymion, and Cassandra with a laurel branch symbolizing her rejection of Apollo as a lover and his revenge. The "sex club" has both: it is decorated with a painting of Hercules surrounded by amorini, as well two "pornographic" scenes (symplegma) similar to those found in brothels. Roman "pornography" (literally "depiction of prostitutes") focuses on human figures in everyday settings, often with detailed and realistic bedding.

Both pornographic images in Room 43 show a woman on top of a man, one facing him, and the other in the less common "reverse upright Venus" position, facing away from the man. In the former image, both figures are nude, except that the woman's breasts are covered with a strapless "bra" (strophium); even in the most explicit depictions of sex acts in Roman art, the woman is often wearing the strophium. The rarer "reverse upright Venus" position is more often found in scenes set in Nilotic Egypt.
