= Giovanni Battista Calò =

Italian painter (1832–1895)

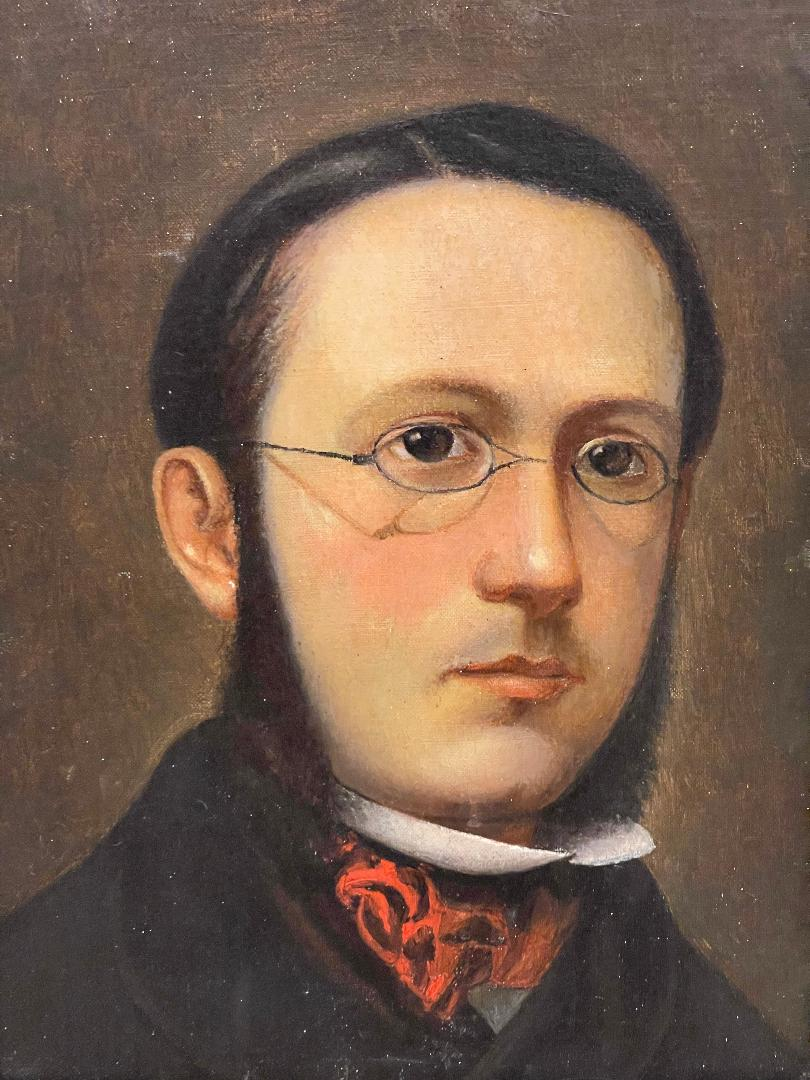
- Giuseppe Gabbiani, Portrait of painter G. B. Calò
- Born: July 16, 1832; Barletta, Apulia, Italy
- Died: August 28, 1895 (aged 63)
- Education: Accademia di Belle Arti di Napoli

Giovanni Battista Calò (July 16, 1832 – August 28, 1895) was an Italian painter of the 19th century.

== Biography ==
Giovanni Battista Calò was born in Barletta, in the region of Apulia, as a boy he developed a passion for art and so at the age of 18 he managed to move to Naples to study under the guidance of Giuseppe Mancinelli at the Accademia di Belle Arti di Napoli. Trained as a portrait painter, at the age of 30 he was suddenly struck by tuberculosis, from which he managed to recover.

He later undertook a series of trips to Europe. He painted the false ceiling depicting the Sun Chariot and one of the stage backdrops for the Curci Theatre. He took part in the exhibitions in Naples and Venice. He was the teacher of Giuseppe De Nittis, one of the most important impressionist painters, and trained other important painters from Barletta including Geremia Discanno, Raffaele Girondi, Vincenzo De Stefano and Giuseppe Gabbiani.

He participated in the National Exhibition of Florence in 1861, in that of Milan in 1872 and 1874 and in 1875 he presented in Florence La Disfida di Barletta, a sketch of the curtain for the Curci theater of his city. In 1884 at the National Exhibition of Turin, his painting Donna col velo was awarded and included in the Gazzettino artistico-letterario of Florence.

With the work Signor Goucez, he landed at the Salon of Paris of 1890.

Many of his works are preserved in the Museo civico di Barletta located on the first floor of the castle, thanks to the Gabbiani donation. Others are scattered in numerous churches in Puglia, including the Church of Purgatory.

He died in his hometown in 1895, at the age of sixty-three, and was buried in the monumental cemetery of Barletta.

Specializing mainly as a portraitist, his production also includes images of sacred subjects, landscapes and genre paintings.

== Gallery ==
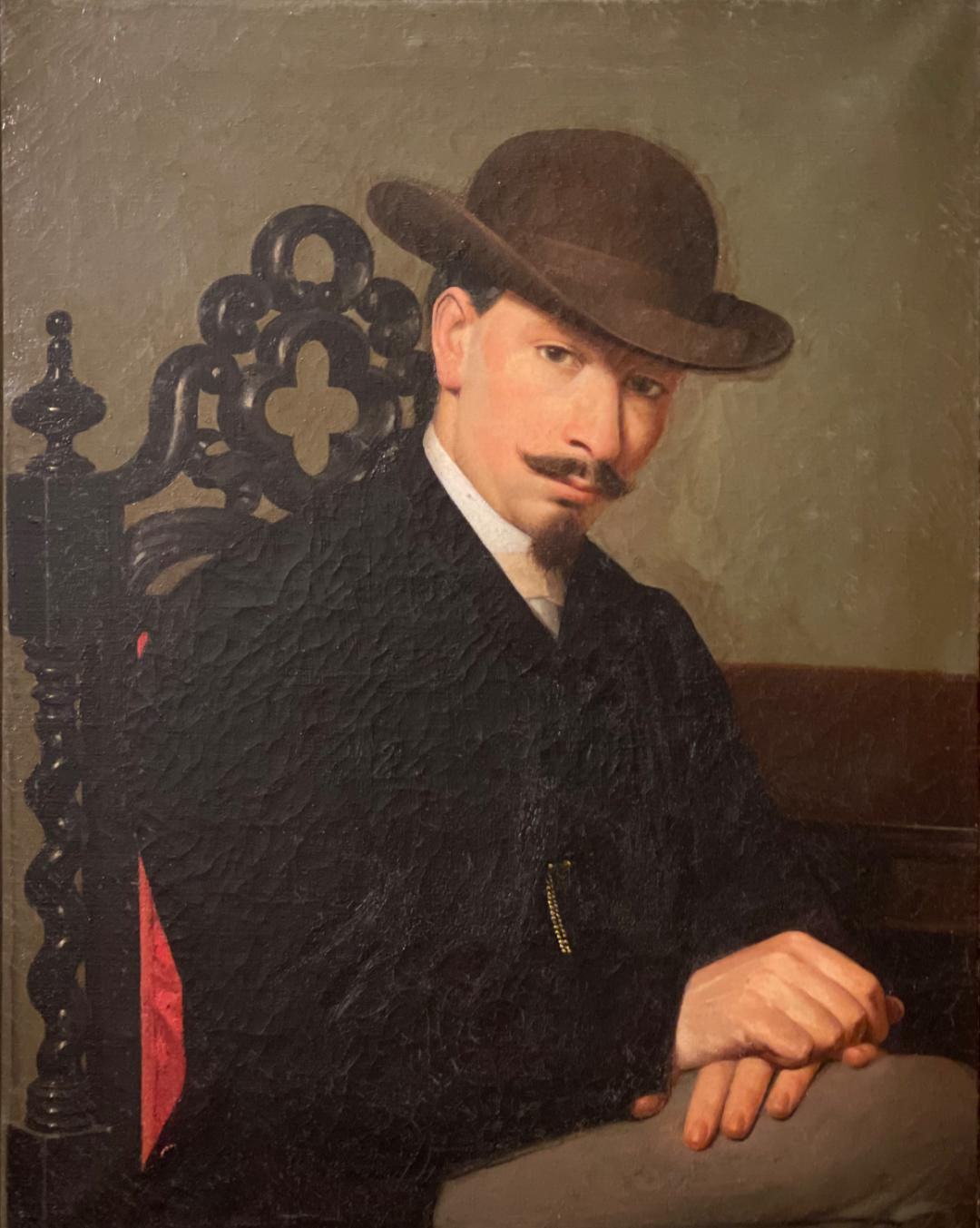
Giovanni Battista Calò, Portrait of Carmine De Martino

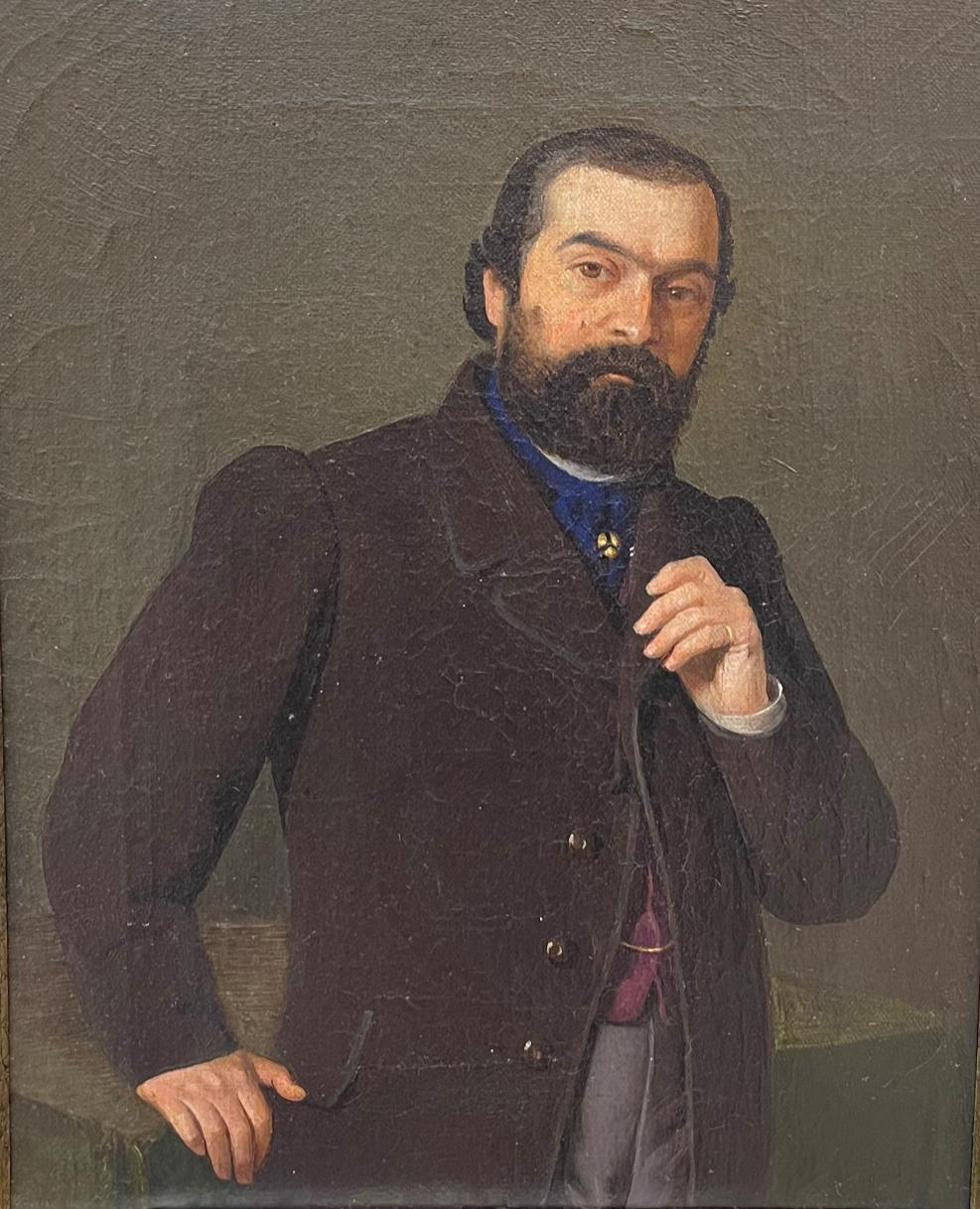
Giovanni Battista Calò, Portrait of Don Gaetano Cafiero

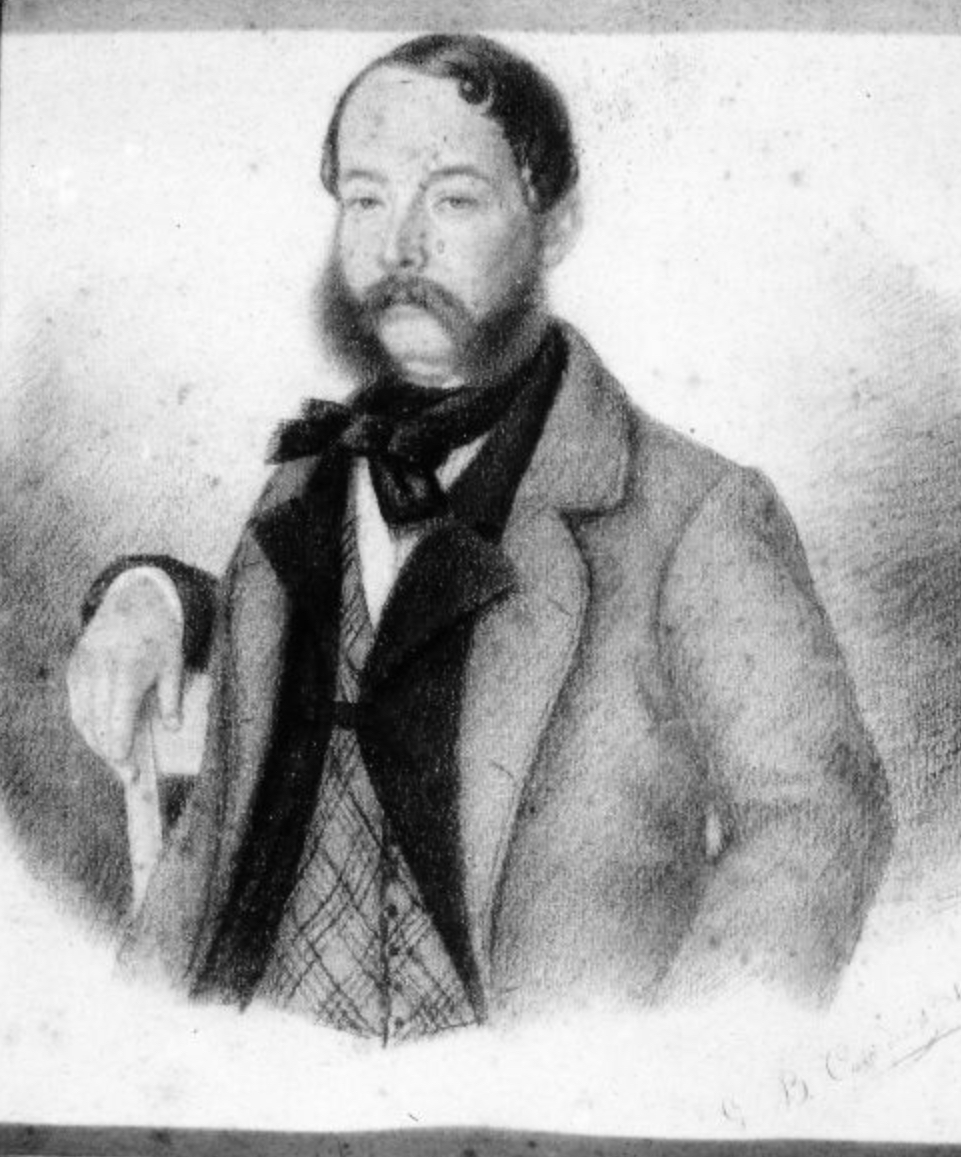
Giovanni Battista Calò, Portrait of Mr. De Leone, drawing 1851

== Bibliography ==
- Carlo Villani, Ancient, modern and contemporary Apulian writers and artists, V. Vecchi publisher, Trani 1904
- A.M. Comanducci, Illustrated dictionary of modern and contemporary Italian painters and engravers, III edition, Milan 1962
- E. Benezit, Dictionnaire des peintres sculpteurs et graveurs, III volume, pag. 136, Gründ edition, 1999
- Christine Farese Sperken, 19th Century Painting in Puglia, Adda publisher, 2015
