= August Mau =

German art historian (1840–1909)

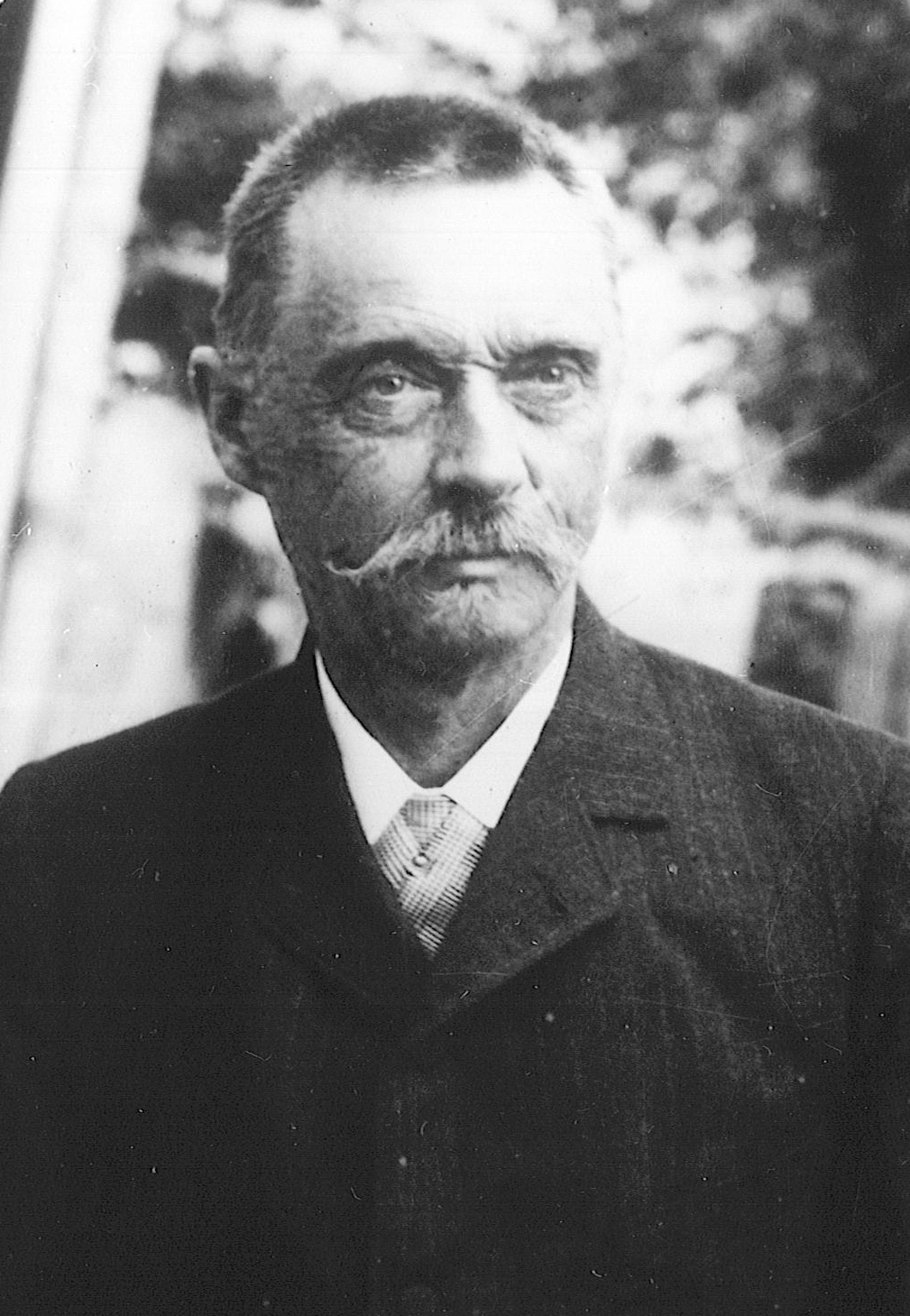
August Mau

August Mau (15 October 1840 in Kiel – 6 March 1909 in Rome) was a German art historian and archaeologist who worked with the German Archaeological Institute studying and classifying Roman paintings that survived the volcanic eruption at Pompeii.

== Biography ==
Mau was born in Kiel, where he read Classical Philology at the University of Kiel, and then at the University of Bonn.

He moved to Rome, for reasons of ill-health, in 1872, where he became Secretary to the Deutsches Archäologisches Institut (German Archaeological Institute) and catalogued the holdings of its extensive library.

He studied and classified the Roman paintings at the city of Pompeii, which was destroyed by volcanic eruption in 79 AD. The paintings were in remarkably good condition due to the preservation by the volcanic ash that covered the city. Mau first divided these paintings into four Pompeian styles still used as a classification. His interests lay in Pompeii, with inscriptions and Roman wall paintings, where he built upon the earlier work published by Wolfgang Helbig and Giuseppe Fiorelli.

Mau died in Rome in 1909.

== Publications ==
- Pompejanische Beiträge. Reimer, Berlin 1879
- Geschichte der decorativen Wandmalerei in Pompeji. Reimer, Berlin 1882.
- Führer durch Pompeji. Furchheim, Naples 1893
- Pompeji in Leben und Kunst. Engelmann, Leipzig 1900
- Katalog der Bibliothek des Kaiserlich Deutschen Archäologischen Instituts in Rom. Löscher, Rome In parts, 1913–1932,
