= The Train Passes =

Painting by Giuseppe De Nittis

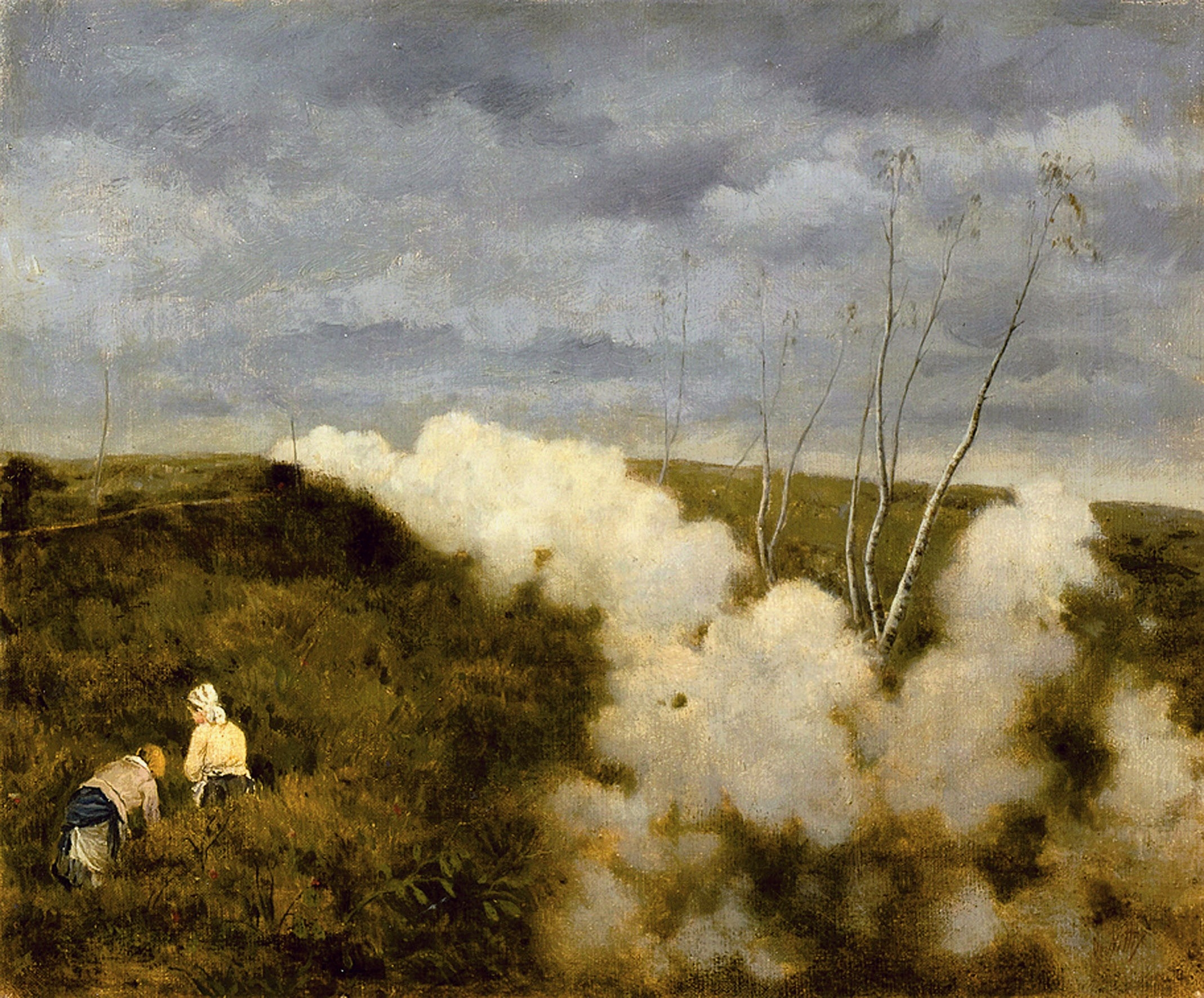
- Artist: Giuseppe De Nittis
- Year: c. 1880
- Type: Oil on canvas, landscape painting
- Dimensions: 75 cm × 130 cm (30 in × 51 in)
- Location: Pinacoteca Giuseppe De Nittis, Barletta

The Train Passes is an oil on canvas painting by Italian artist Giuseppe De Nittis, from c. 1880. It is held at the Pinacoteca Giuseppe De Nittis, in Barletta.

== Description ==
De Nittis, with a puff of white smoke that crosses arid fields, dilating and expanding transversely, represents the progress of the train, the vanishing point of the pictorial composition.

The horizon divides the painting into two parts: above, a gray, bruised sky, with rain clouds, on a harsh winter's day; below, brown, dry fields, with a sparse stand of bare birch trees. In the foreground, on the left, two peasant women are bent over, with their backs turned, intent on their work and indifferent to the passing train. The headscarves tied around their heads suggest French-style peasant attire.

The modern, moving mechanical vehicle fits into a natural landscape, crossing fields without substantially altering the surrounding reality; as if, once the white smoke has evaporated, everything must necessarily return to the way it was before. The painting was conceived during one of De Nittis's trips between Paris and London, beginning in 1880.

De Nittis belonged to the Resina School; he often painted outdoors, choosing rural subjects. During his frequent stays in France, he was inspired by the Barbizon School, with its sober colors and stark, solitary landscapes. De Nittis's attention to the passage of a mechanical vehicle also preludes a typical futurist theme.

== Provenance ==
The painting was first shown at the IV National Exhibition of Fine Arts in Turin, in 1880. The Train Passes was also presented at the Giuseppe De Nittis personal exhibition, in Paris, in 1886. It belongs to the group of works that, after the painter's death, were donated by his wife Léontine Gruville to the Municipality of Barletta, the painter's hometown. Critics initially dated the painting to 1869 and maintained that the subject was set in the southern Italian countryside. The date was later moved to 1878-1879: the handkerchief, carried by the two peasant women in the foreground, and the birch tree could only refer to a French or Flemish countryside.

The work was also exhibited at the Venice Biennale, in 1914, at the exhibition "De Nittis and the Painters of the Resina School", in Naples, in 1963, and at the Vatican (Charlemagne Wing) at the exhibition "Man's Work from Goya to Kandinsky," organized to honor the centenary of the encyclical Rerum Novarum, in 1991–1992.
