= How Cold It Is! =

Painting by Giuseppe De Nittis

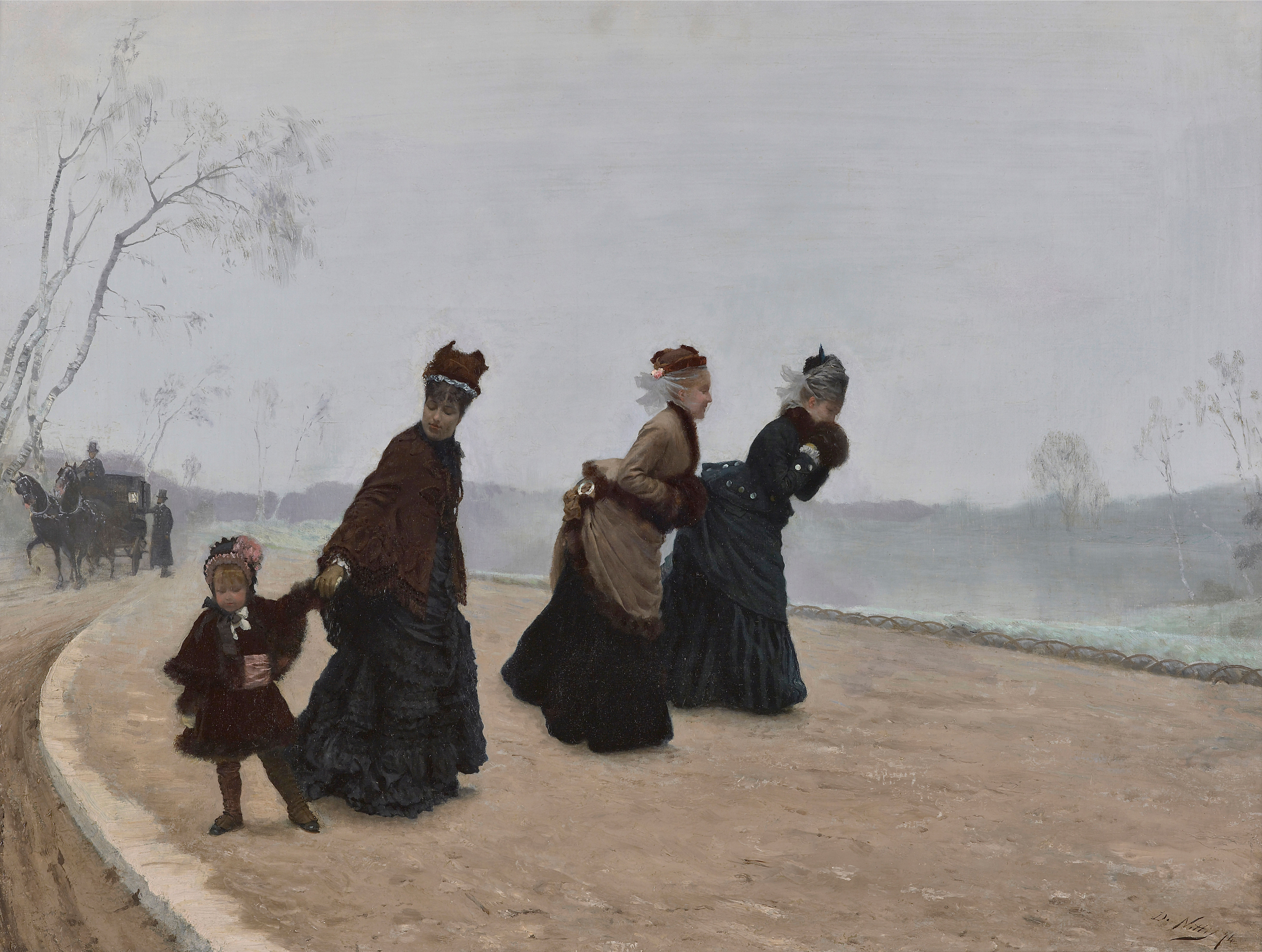
- Artist: Giuseppe De Nittis
- Year: 1874
- Type: Oil on canvas, genre painting
- Dimensions: 54 cm × 73 cm (21 in × 29 in)
- Location: Applied Arts Collection, Milan

How Cold It Is! (Italian: Che Freddo!) is an oil on canvas genre painting by the Italian artist Giuseppe De Nittis, from 1874. It is held at the Applied Arts Collection, in Milan.

== History and description ==
It depicts two fashionably-dressed Parisian ladies walking in a park on a cold, wintery day, while a governess accompanies a small girl nearby. In the background a carriage waits for them. They are seen in an emtpy scenery, with only some trees visible.

De Nittis had moved to France and become closely associated with the emerging Impressionist movement. The painting was displayed at the Salon of 1874 in Paris, the same year that De Nittis also took part in the First Impressionist Exhibition. Amongst the work's admirers was Edgar Degas who acquired an engraving based on it.

== Bibliography ==
- Dumas, Ann. Degas and the Italians in Paris. National Galleries of Scotland, 2003.
- Carter, Karen L. & Waller, Susan Foreign Artists and Communities in Modern Paris, 1870-1914. Routledge, 2017.
- Crepaldi, Gabriele The Impressionists. Collins, 2002.
