= The Road from Naples to Brindisi =

Painting by Giuseppe De Nittis

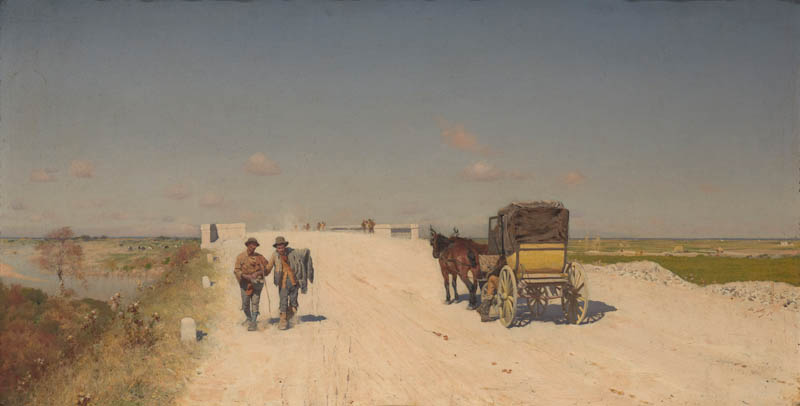
- Artist: Giuseppe De Nittis
- Year: 1872
- Type: Oil on canvas, landscape painting
- Dimensions: 27 cm × 52 cm (11 in × 20 in)
- Location: Indianapolis Museum of Art (loan), Indianapolis

The Road from Naples to Brindisi (Italian: La strada da Napoli a Brindisi) is an oil on canvas landscape painting by the Italian artist Giuseppe De Nittis, from 1872.

== History and description ==
In the early 1870s, de Nittis, returning from Paris, stayed for a long time in Naples and its surroundings, where he portrayed people and painted landscapes of the places he visited, as in this work, which stylistically and thematically takes up The Passage of the Apennines (1867). This was a milestone among the artist's works, and was among those that allowed him to establish a work contract with the famous French art dealer Adolphe Goupil. The secret of the success of these works was that these subjects depicting foreign landscapes appealed to the Parisian bourgeoisie of the time, but also the point of view at street level and the setting were both a novelty.

Impressionistic in style, the painting depicts the road stranding from Naples to Brindisi, in Southern Italy. Under the warm sun of Southern Italy, in the green countryside, along the white road, built during the Bourbon era, which connected Naples and Brindisi, some figures are seen passing. On the left, there are two farmers chatting, while heading in the direction of the viewer, while on the right, another figure, perhaps the French painter Gustave Caillebotte, a friend of De Nittis, is getting into a stagecoach, heading towards the big city.

== Provenance ==
The painting was first exhibited at the Salon of 1872 in Paris and then again at the First Impressionist Exhibition in 1874. Since 1999 it has been displayed in the Indianapolis Museum of Art in Indiana, on loan from a private collection.

== Controversy ==
In September 2023, while the painting was on temporary loan for two years at the Pinacoteca Giuseppe De Nittis, in Barletta, Prof. Giovanni Lamacchia, a painter and writer, in an article published on Antenna Sud, raised the hypothesis that the current painting could be a fake. According to him, comparing it with the original photo of which the painting was made, taken by Goupil for De Nittis, certain details are missing, such as the stones, at the side of the road. Secondly, there are unspecified technical problems. Unfortunately, the subsequent death of the scholar in February 2024 did not allow further investigation of the matter.

== Bibliography ==
- Force, Christel H. (ed) Pioneers of the Global Art Market: Paris-Based Dealer Networks, 1850-1950. Bloomsbury Publishing, 2022.
- Miracco, Renato. De Nittis: La Strada da Napoli a Brindisi. Barletta: Editrice ROTAS, 2023.
- Morel, Dominique & Angiuli, Emanuela. Giuseppe De Nittis: la modernité élégante. Paris musées, 2010.
- Patry, Sylvie & Robbins, Anne Paris 1874: The Impressionist Moment. Yale University Press, 2024.
