= Westminster (painting) =

Painting by Giuseppe De Nittis

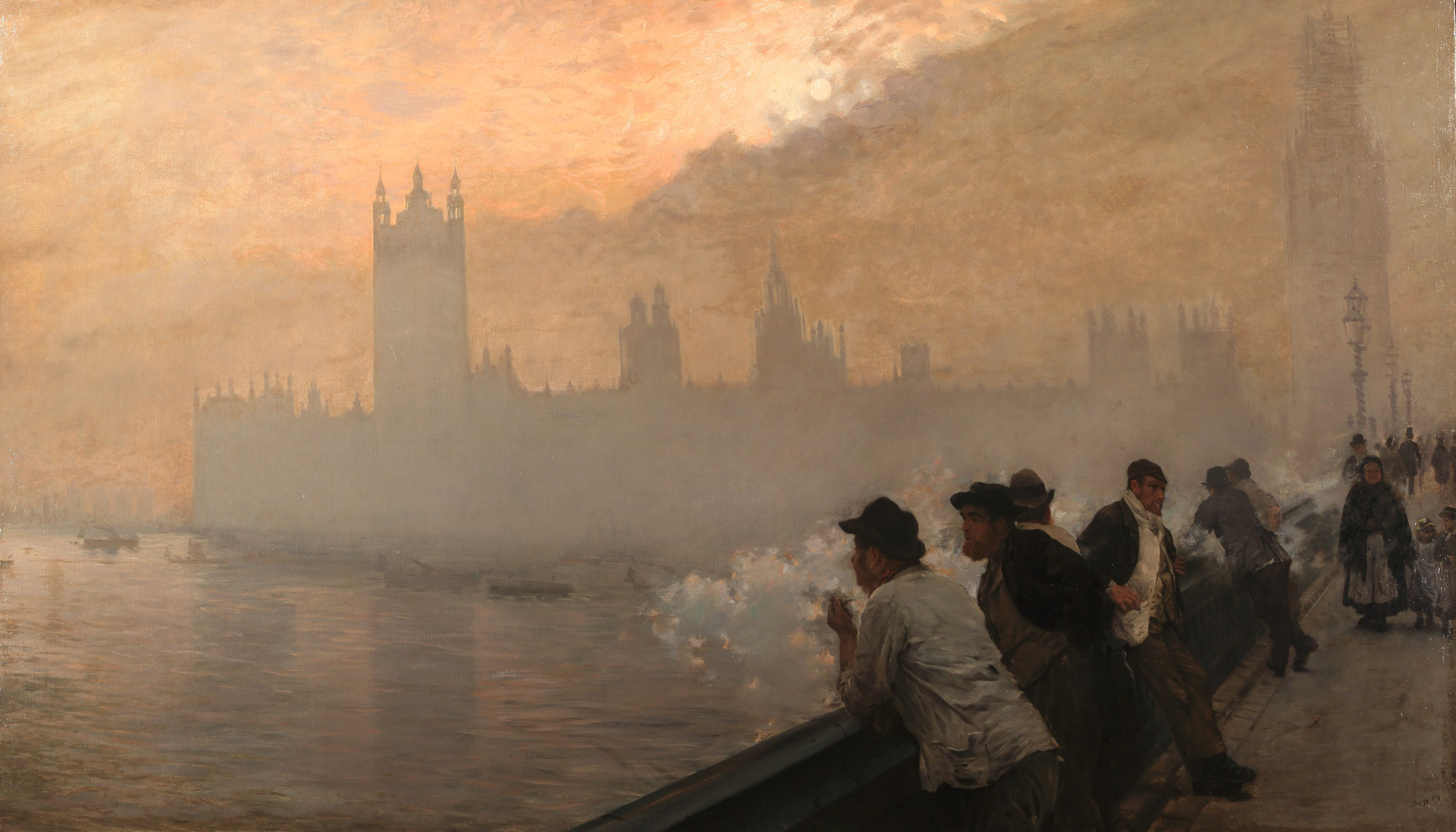
- Artist: Giuseppe De Nittis
- Year: c. 1875
- Type: Oil on canvas, landscape painting
- Dimensions: 110 cm × 192 cm (43 in × 76 in)
- Location: Private collection

Westminster is a cityscape oil painting on canvas by the Italian artist Giuseppe De Nittis, from c. 1875. It is held at a private collection.

== History and description ==
It features a view from Westminster Bridge, in Central London, looking towards the Houses of Parliament. De Nittis was a member of the Impressionist movement and his style shows the influence of earlier works of the River Thames by Claude Monet. It was of the ten views of London commissioned from the artist by the British banker Kaye Knowles. It is sometimes dated later to around 1878 and has been known by the title Palace of Westminster, London. It was displayed at the Exposition Universelle of 1878 in Paris. Today it is in a private collection.

== Bibliography ==
- Ackroyd, Peter. Forgotten London: Exploring the Hidden Life of the City. Frances Lincoln, 2025.
- Carter, Karen L. & Waller, Susan Foreign Artists and Communities in Modern Paris, 1870-1914. Routledge, 2017.
- Silverman, Deborah. Van Gogh in England. Barbican Art Gallery, 1992.
