= Breakfast in the Garden =

Painting by Giuseppe De Nittis

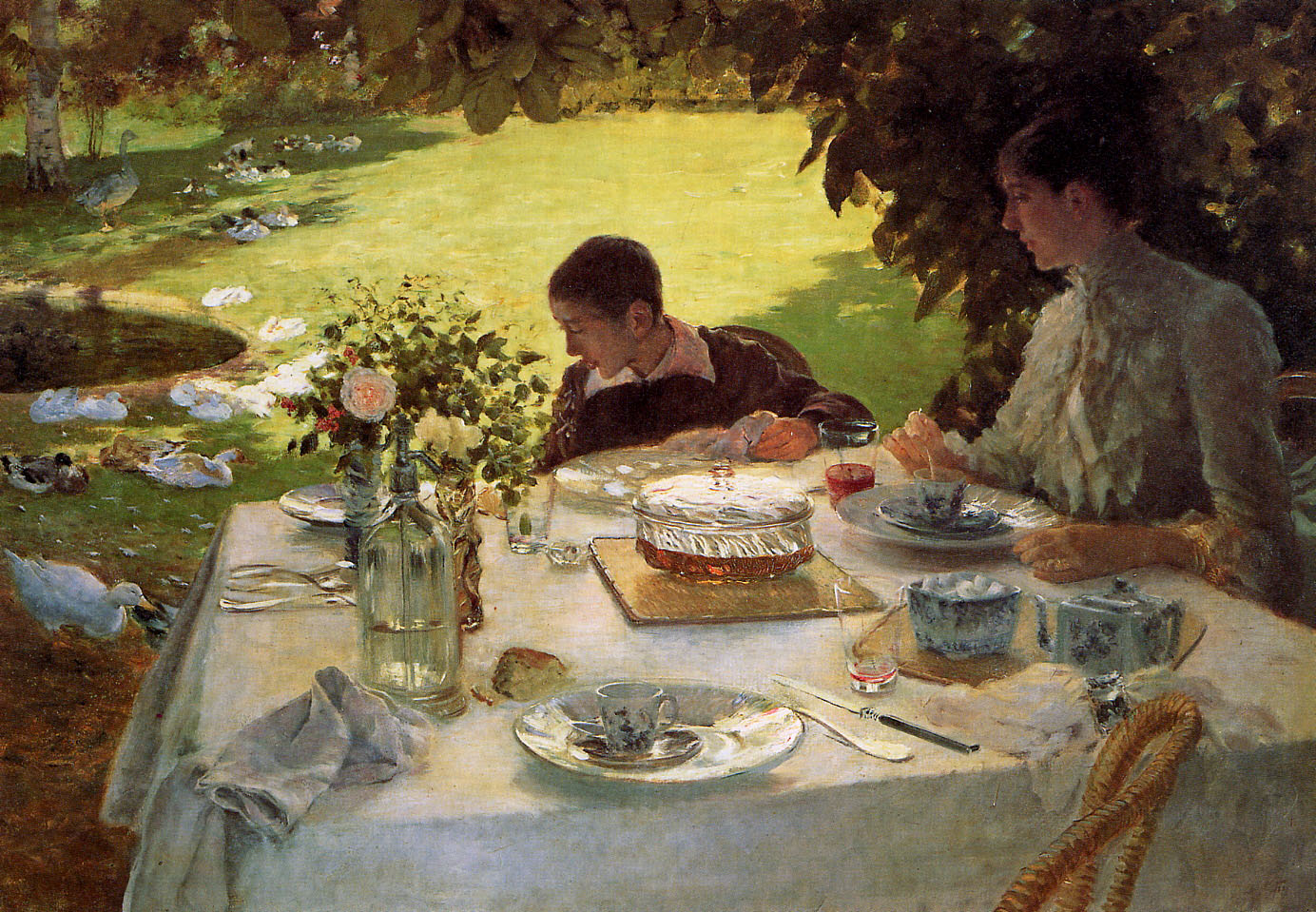
- Artist: Giuseppe De Nittis
- Year: 1884
- Type: Oil on canvas, genre painting
- Dimensions: 81 cm × 117 cm (32 in × 46 in)
- Location: Pinacoteca Giuseppe de Nittis, Barletta

Breakfast in the Garden (Italian: Colazione in giardino) is an oil on canvas genre painting by the Italian artist Giuseppe De Nittis, from 1884. It is held at the Pinacoteca Giuseppe de Nittis, in the artist's native Barletta.

== History and description ==
A noted Impressionist, he produced this painting En plein air. It depicts his wife Léontine De Nittis and son Jacques De Nittis having a breakfast in a garden. She is partially covered by the shadow of a tree. Several ducks and even a goose are seen in a lawn, coming from a pool, and the attention of Jacques is attracted by one of them who is approaching, possibly with his intention to feed him.

It was one of the final works that De Nittis produced before his death the same year and was displayed at the Salon (Paris) of 1884.

== Bibliography ==
- Carter, Karen L. & Waller, Susan Foreign Artists and Communities in Modern Paris, 1870-1914. Routledge, 2017.
- Morel, Dominique & Angiuli, Emanuela. Giuseppe De Nittis: la modernité élégante. Paris musées, 2010.
- Lamacchia, Giovanni & Belloli, Mariagraziella. Il dossier De Nittis: Un maestro dell'Impressionismo nella documentazione degli Archives Nationales de France. Stilo Editrice, 2016.
