= Giuseppe De Nittis =

Italian painter (1846–1884)

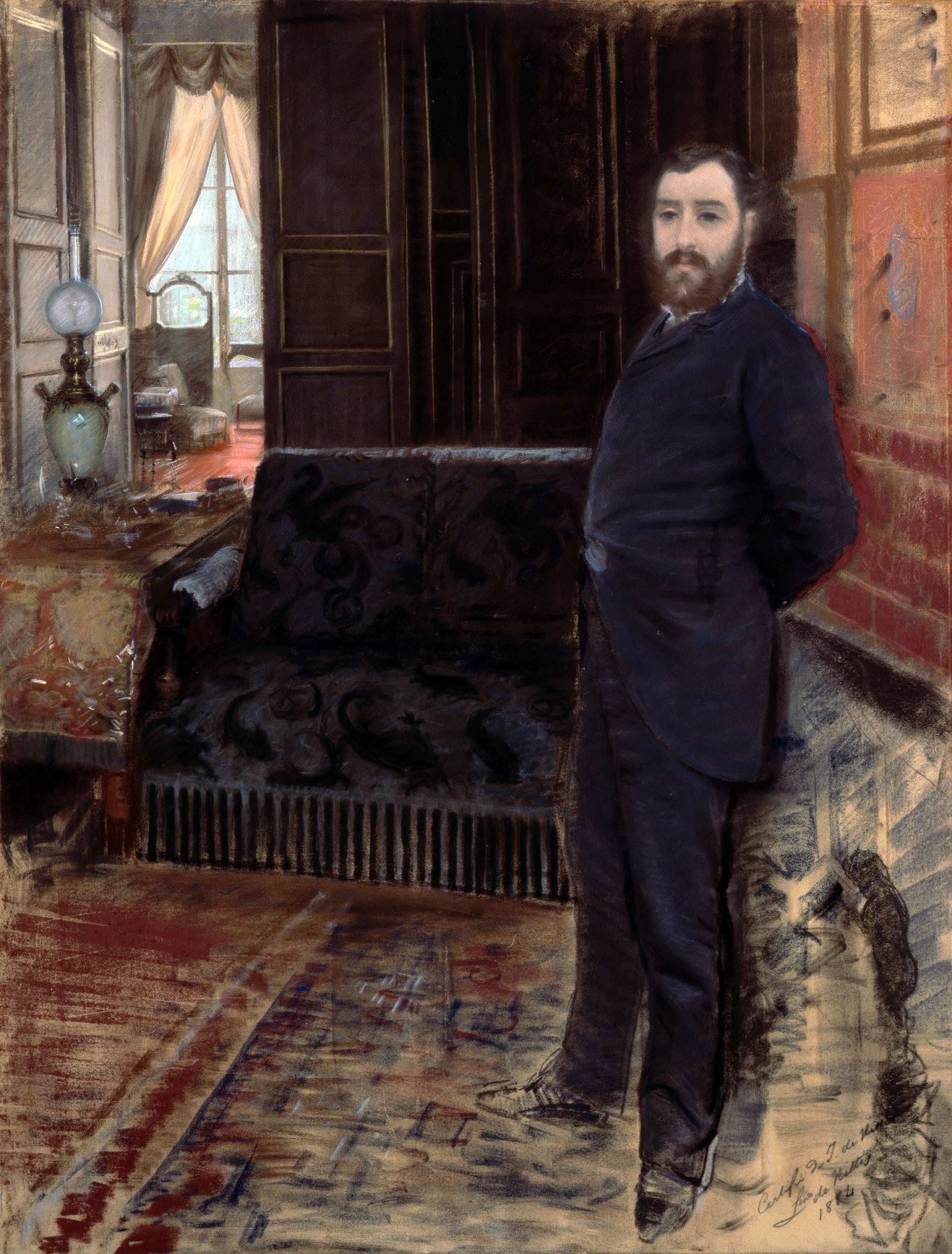
- Giuseppe De Nittis, Self-Portrait, 1884
- Born: 25 February 1846; Barletta, Italy
- Died: 21 August 1884 (aged 38); Saint-Germain-en-Laye, France
- Education: Reale Instituto di Belle Arti
- Known for: Painting
- Movement: Impressionism
- Awards: Legion of Honour

Giuseppe De Nittis (February 25, 1846 – August 21, 1884) was one of the most important Italian painters of the 19th century, whose work merges the styles of Salon art and Impressionism.

== Biography ==
De Nittis was born in Barletta, in the region of Apulia, where he lived with his family in the wealthiest district of the city near the intersection of the Corso Vittorio Emanuele and the Corso Garibaldi, just around the corner from the birthplace of another famous painter and contemporary, Geremia Discanno.

Barletta at the time of the Bourbons, and in particular during the reign of Ferdinand II, nicknamed the "Bomb King" for having his own subjects cannonaded, was an extremely class-oriented city and those who could afford it gathered regularly near De Nittis' home beneath the Basilica of the Holy Sepulcher with its bronze Colossus of Heraclius in front. Situated on the Adriatic coast, Barletta's port thrived as a point of embarkation for the privileged travelling to or returning from the east.

His father, Raffaele, was a wealthy landowner who could afford to send his son to study under Giovanni Battista Calò, who tutored other notable Barlettan painters including Vincenzo De Stefano, Giuseppe Gabbiani, and Raffaele Girondi. But, Raffaele was publicly outspoken in his opposition to the Bourbon monarchy and support for the unification of Italy, so was imprisoned for two years. Still, Giuseppe managed to gain admittance to the Reale Instituto di Belle Arti, a university-level art school in Naples founded by King Charles VII of Naples in 1752. Like his father, though, Giuseppe openly spoke his mind, resulting in his expulsion from the Institute in 1863 for insurbordination. After his expulsion, he launched his career with the exhibition of two paintings at the 1864 Neapolitan Promotrice. De Nittis came into contact with some of the artists known as the Macchiaioli, becoming friends with Telemaco Signorini and exhibiting in Florence. He also renewed his acquaintance with his former neighbor, Geremia Discanno, and both De Nittis and Discanno exhibited in Turin in 1867 and sold work there.

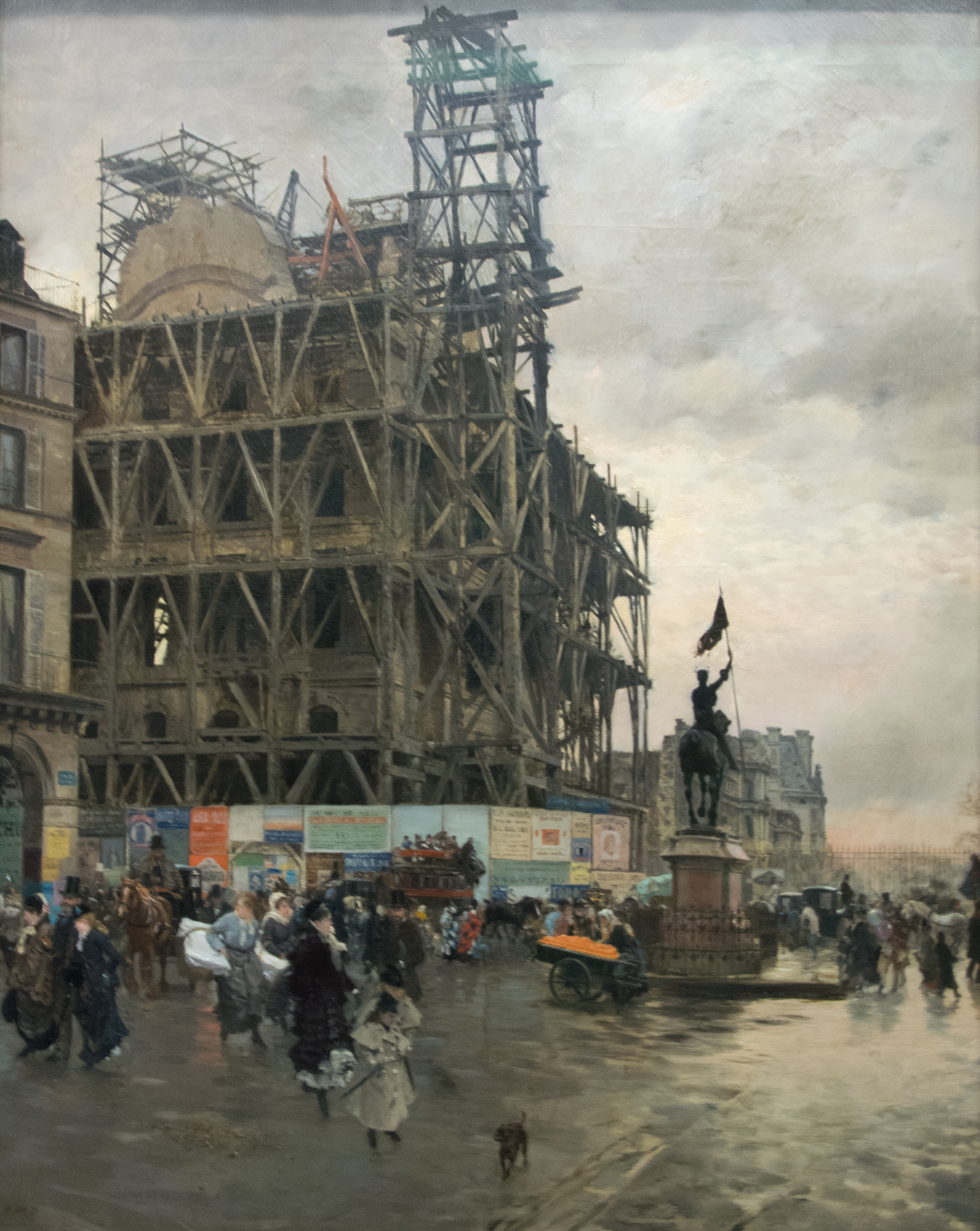
La Place des Pyramides, Paris, 1875

In 1867 he moved to Paris and entered into a contract with the art dealer Adolphe Goupil, which called for him to produce saleable genre works. After gaining some visibility by exhibiting at the Salon he returned to Italy where, feeling free to paint from nature, he produced several views of Vesuvius.

In 1872 De Nittis returned to Paris and, no longer under contract to Goupil, achieved a success at the Salon with his painting Che freddo! (It's So Cold!) of 1874 (Private collection). In that same year he was invited to exhibit at the First Impressionist Exhibition, held at Nadar's. The invitation came from Edgar Degas, who was a friend of several Italian artists residing in Paris, including Telemaco Signorini, Giovanni Boldini, and Federico Zandomeneghi. De Nittis was not accepted by all of the Impressionists and did not participate in their subsequent exhibitions.

A trip to London resulted in a number of Impressionistic paintings. In 1875 De Nittis took up pastels, which became an important medium for him in his remaining years and which he helped popularize. Back in Paris, where his home was a favorite gathering place for Parisian writers and artists as well as for expatriate Italians, he executed pastel portraits of sitters including De Goncourt, Zola, Manet, and Duranty. He preferred pastels as the medium for his largest works, such as the triptych entitled Races at Auteuil (1881).

De Nittis exhibited twelve paintings in the Exposition Universelle of 1878 and was awarded a gold medal. In that same year he received the Légion d’honneur.

In 1884, at the age of 38, De Nittis died suddenly of a stroke at Saint-Germain-en-Laye. His wife, the Parisian Léontine Lucile Gruvelle (married in 1869), donated his paintings to the town of Barletta, and they are now gathered in the Pinacoteca Giuseppe De Nittis in the Palace of the Marra in the hometown of the painter.

Works by De Nittis are in many public collections, including the Musée d'Orsay in Paris, the British Museum in London, the Metropolitan Museum of Art in New York, and the Ashmolean Museum in Oxford. His paintings Return from the Races and The Connoisseurs are in the Philadelphia Museum of Art. The Phillips Collection in Washington, D.C. held a special exhibition of works by De Nittis from November 12, 2022 to February 12, 2023. A catalog was published to accompany the exhibition.

== Gallery ==
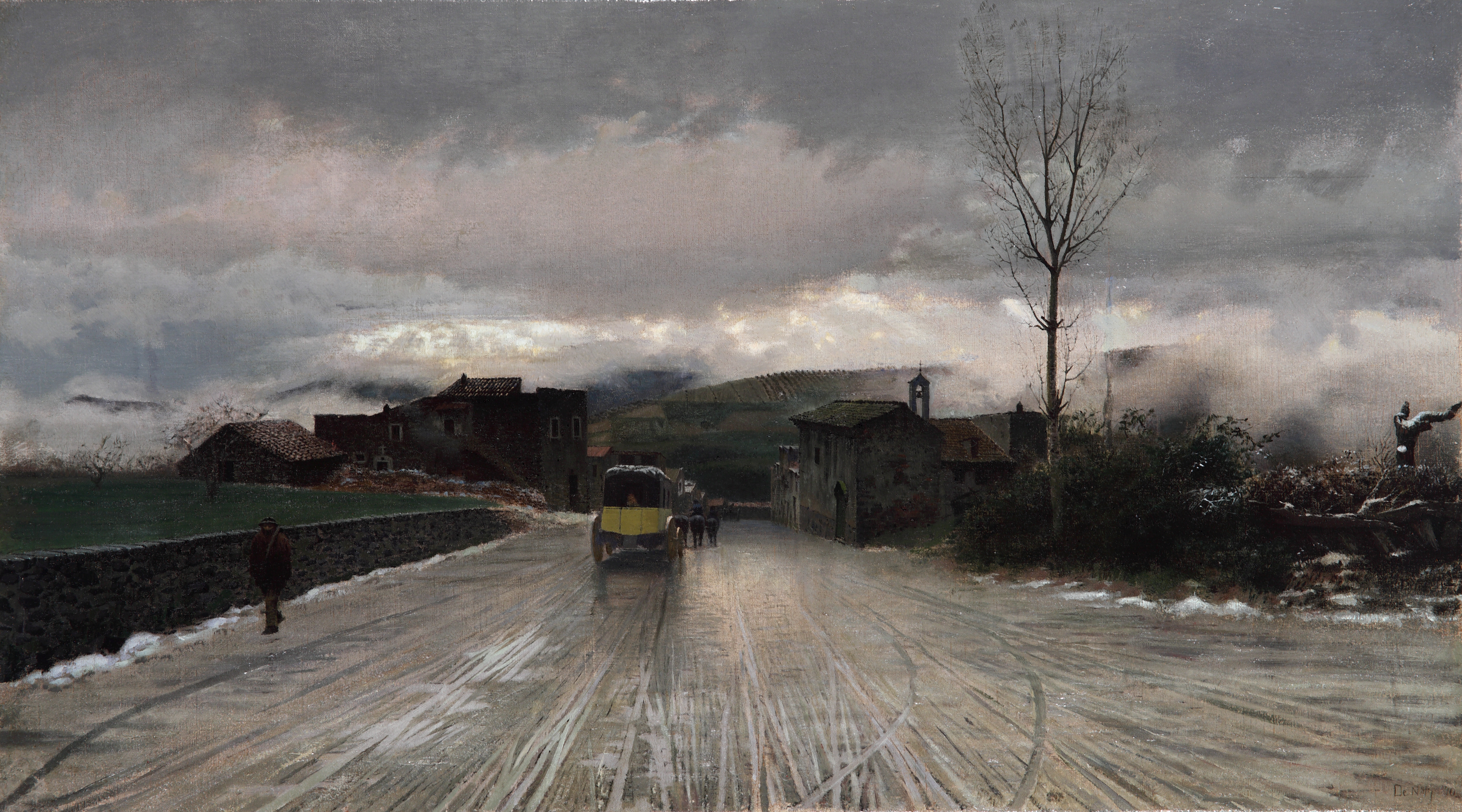
Crossing the Apennines, 1867

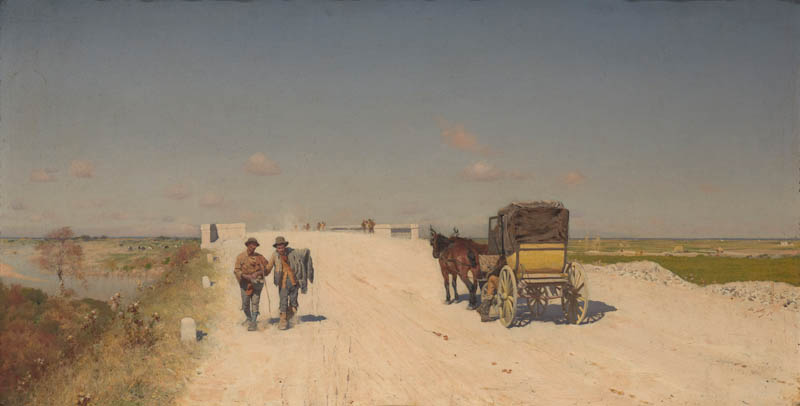
The Road from Naples to Brindisi, 1872

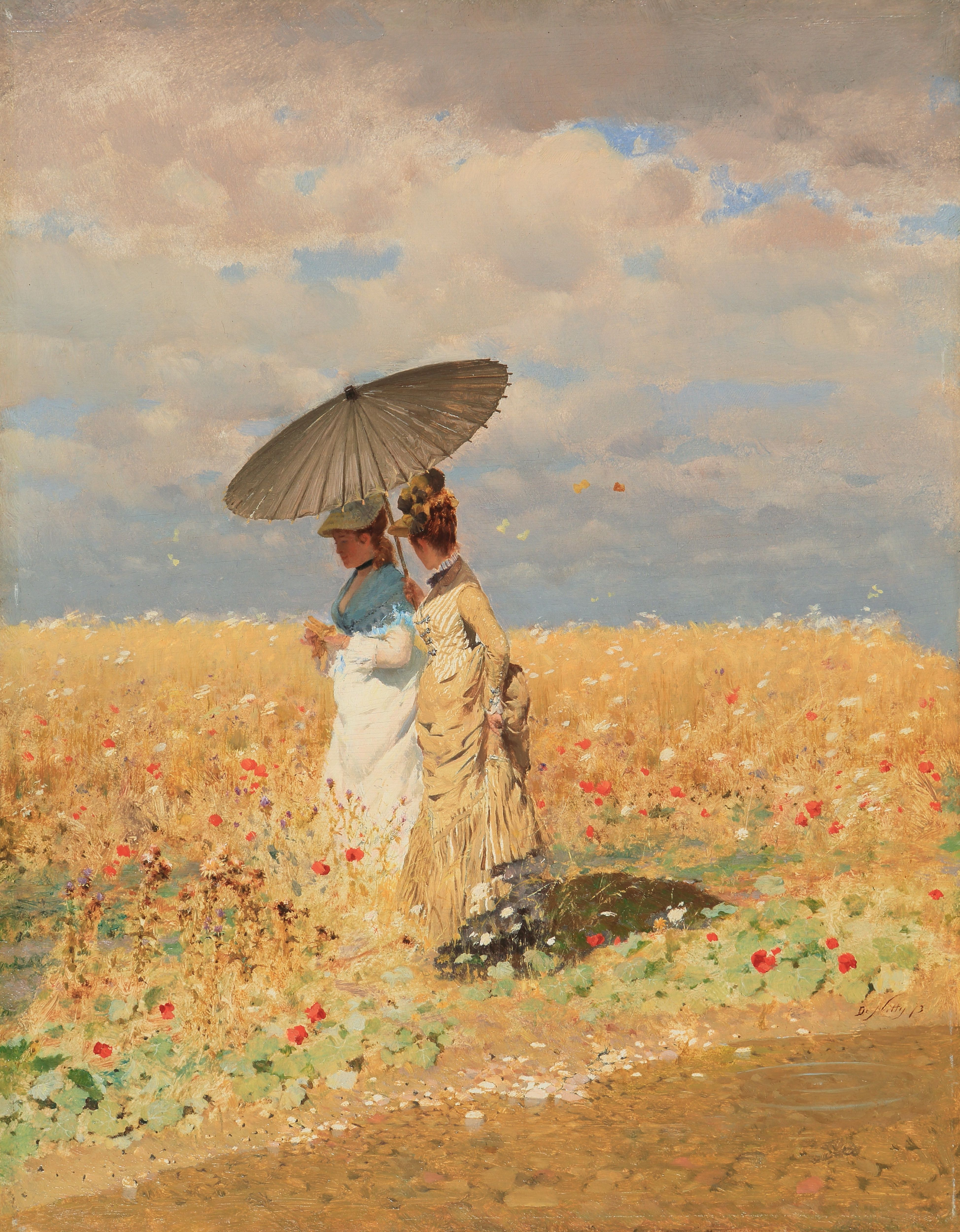
In the Wheat Fields, 1873

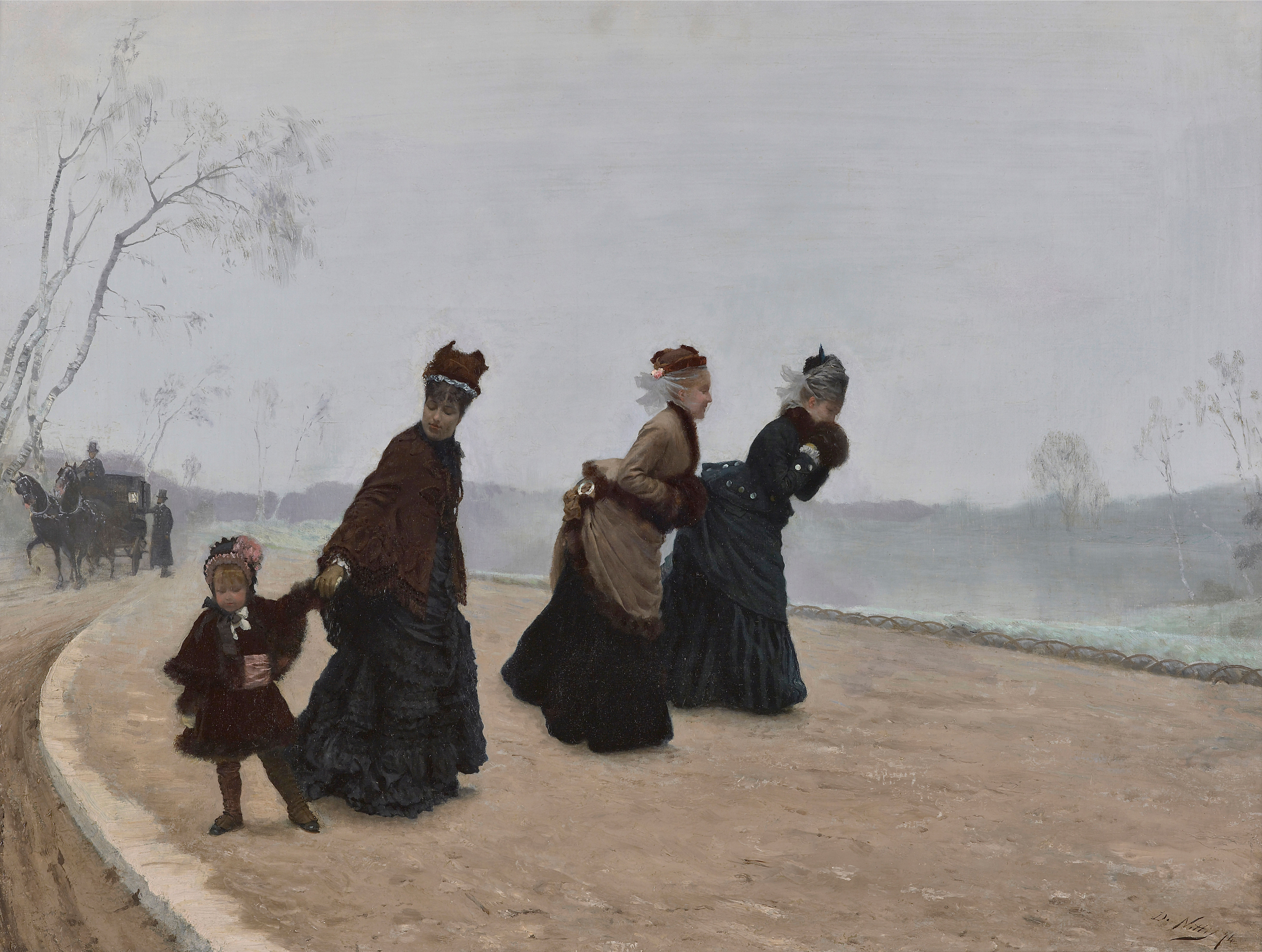
How Cold It Is!, 1874

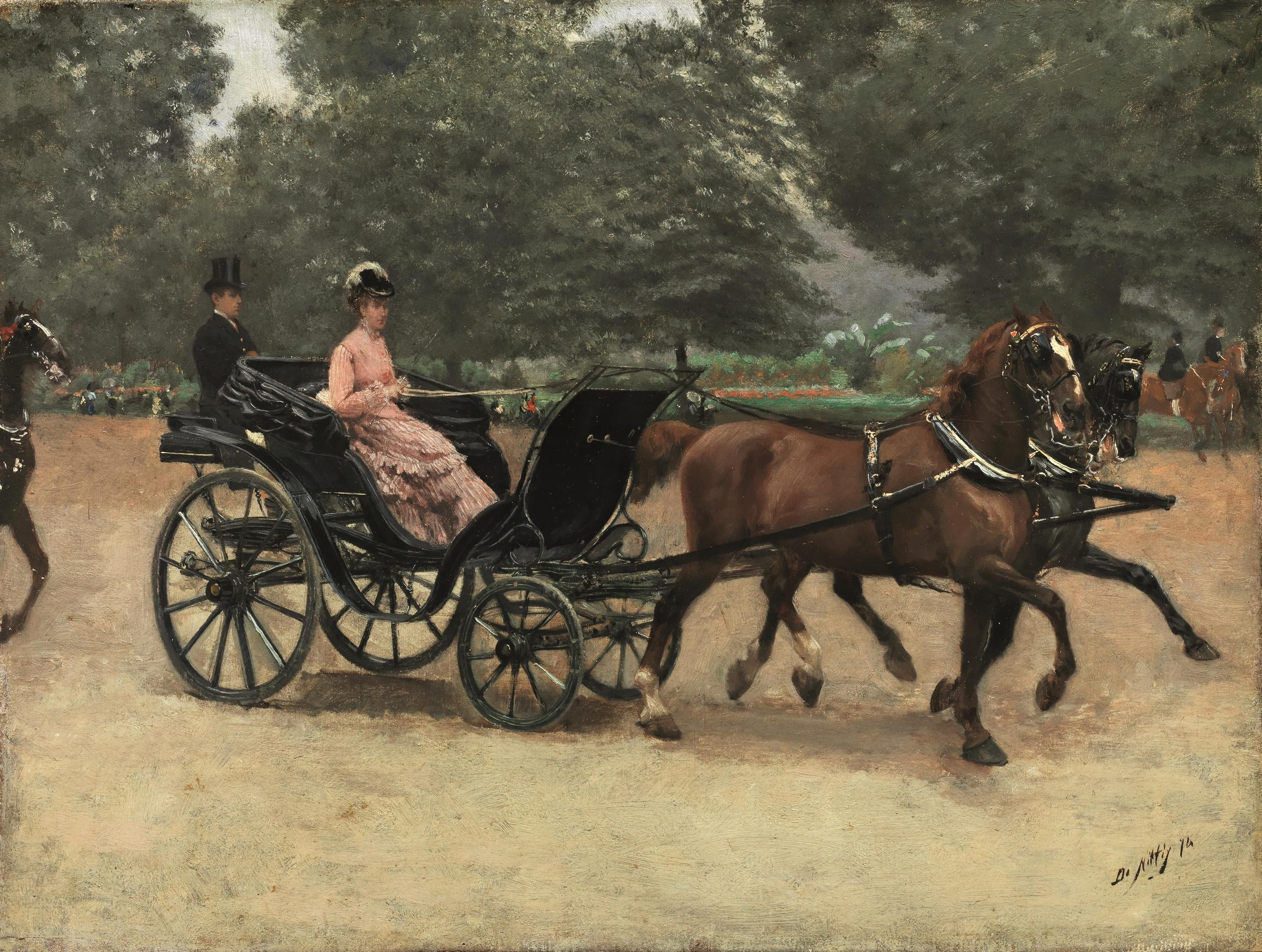
Carriage in the Bois de Boulogne, 1874

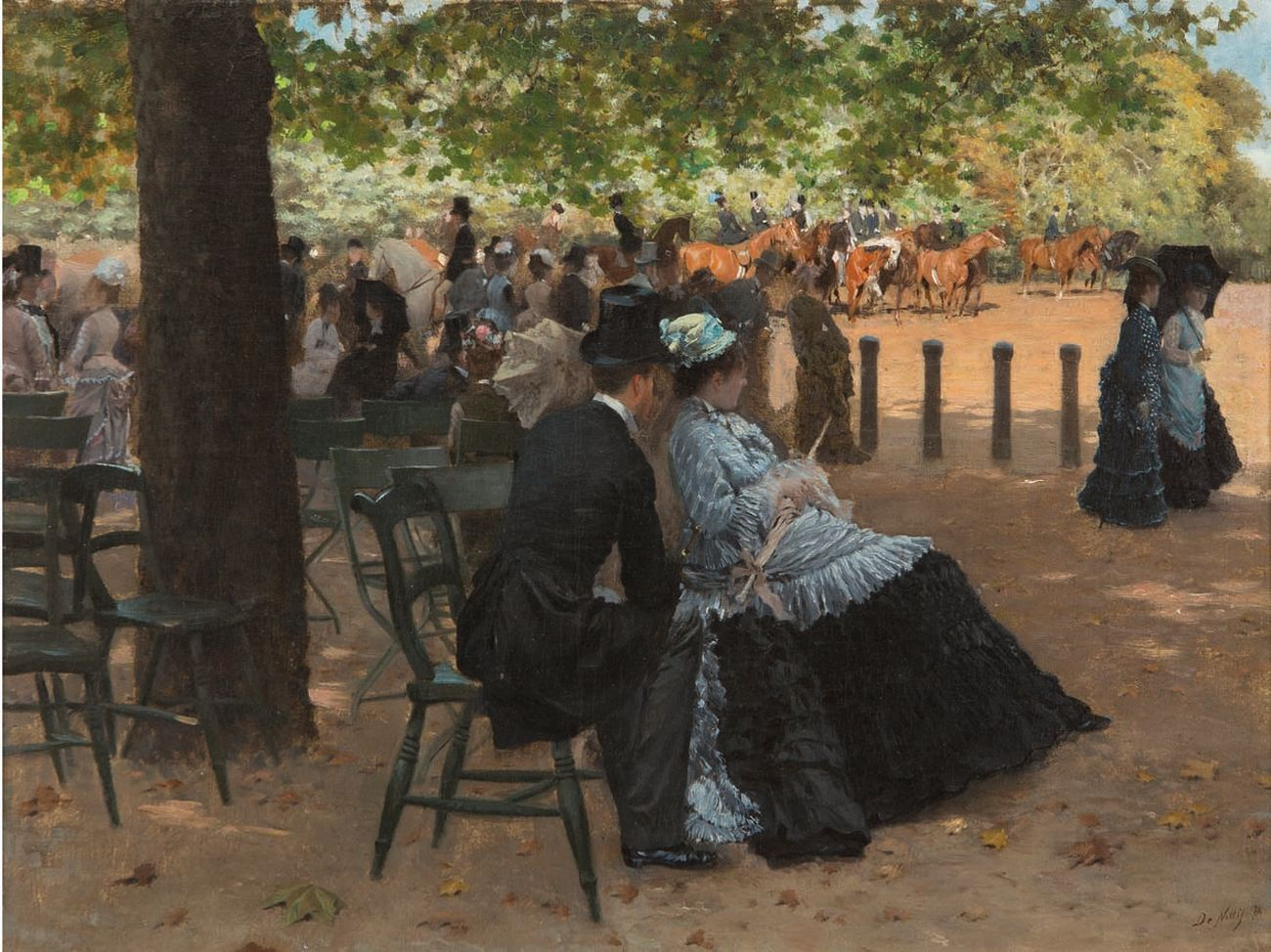
Hyde Park, 1874

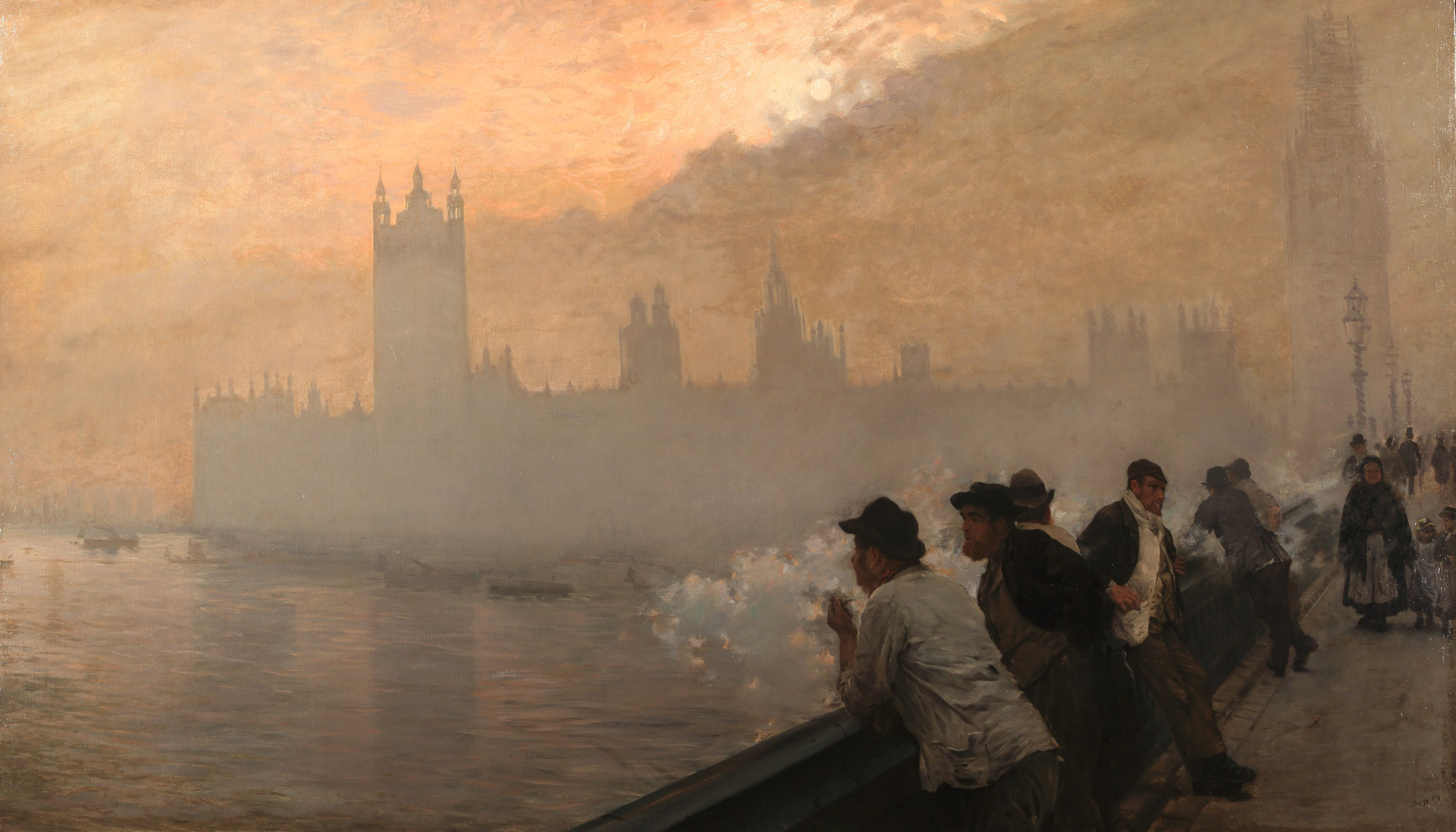
Westminster, 1875

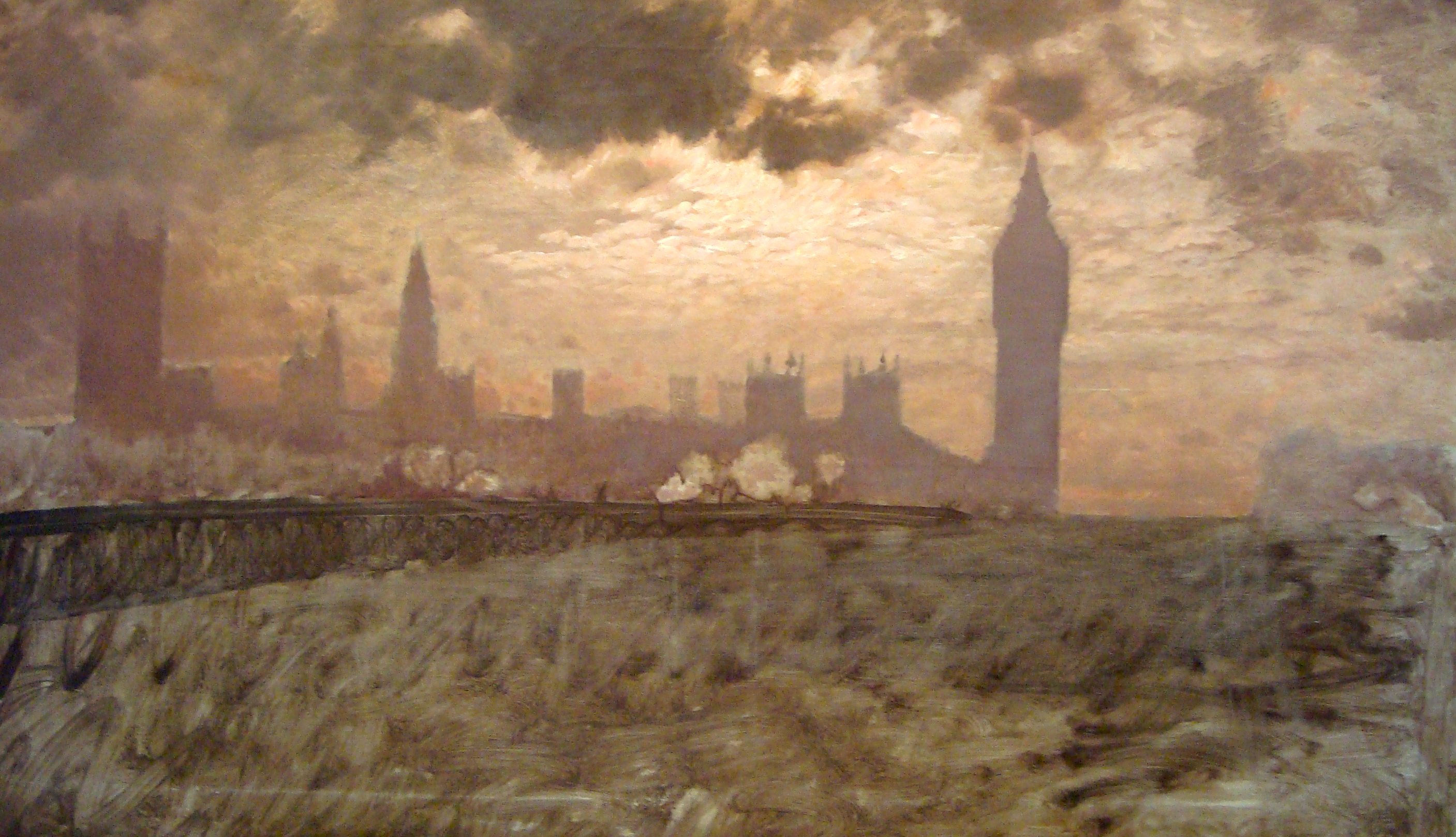
Westminster Bridge, 1878

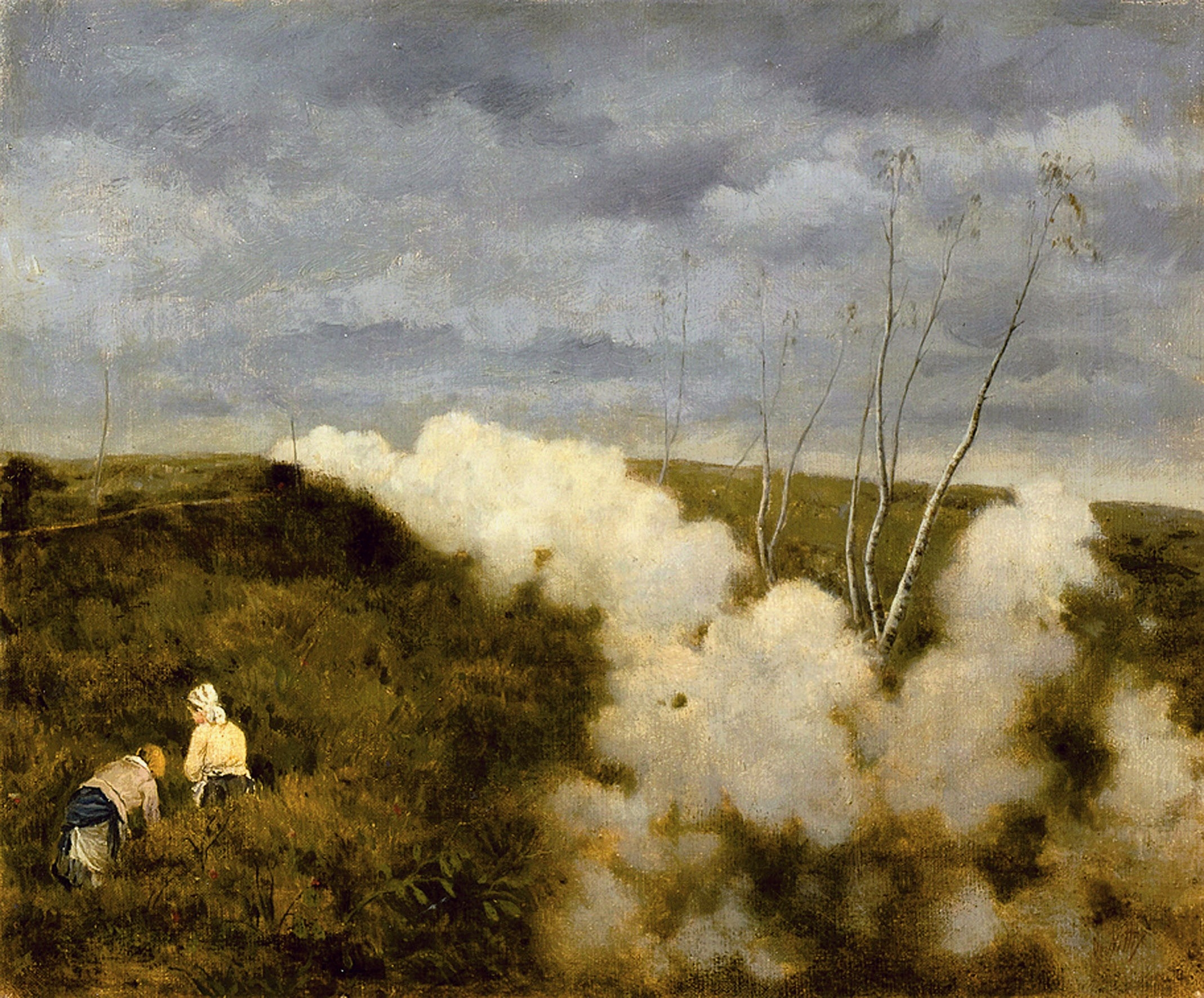
The Train Passes, 1878

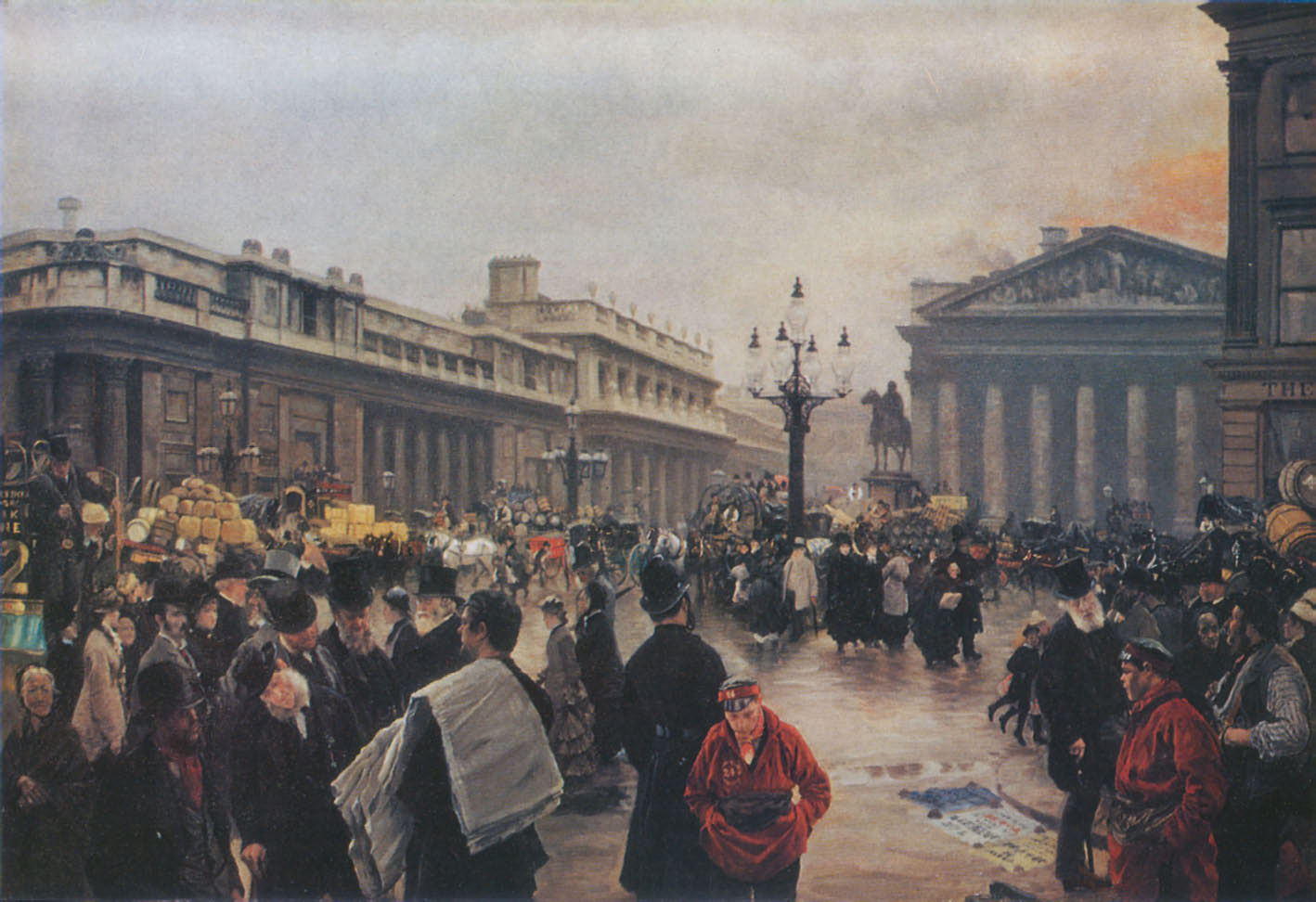
The Bank of England, 1878

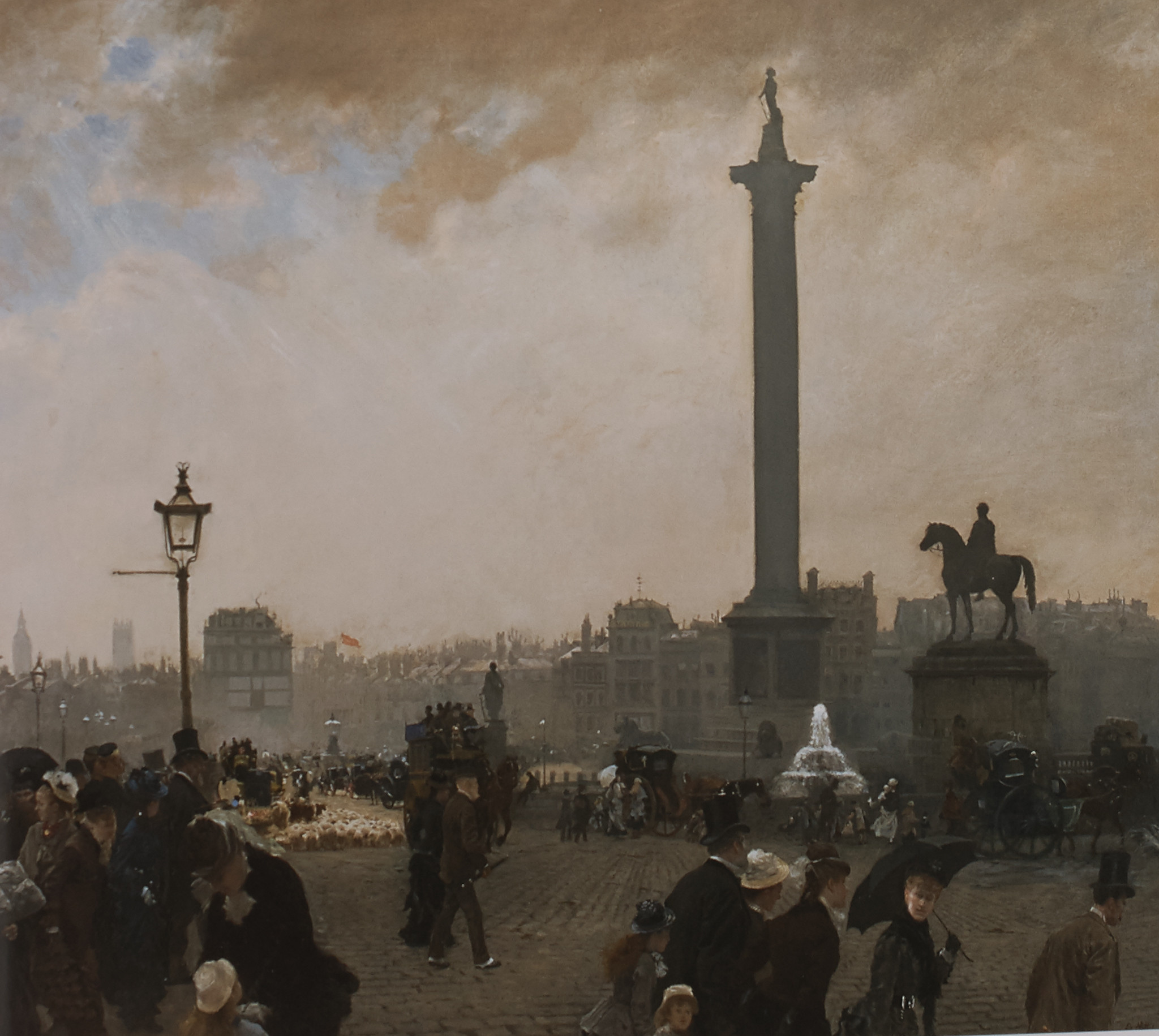
Trafalgar Square, 1878

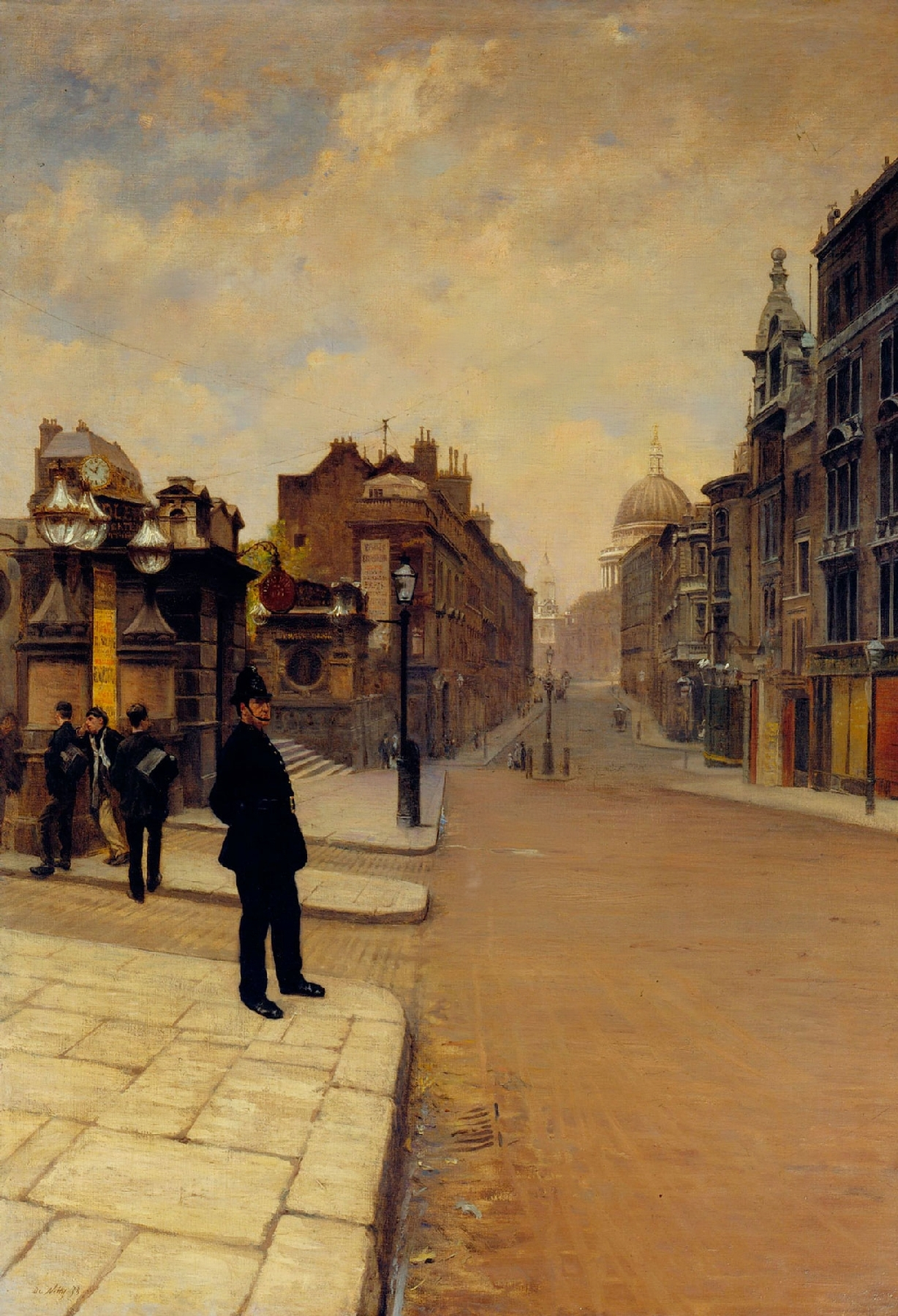
Sunday in London, 1878

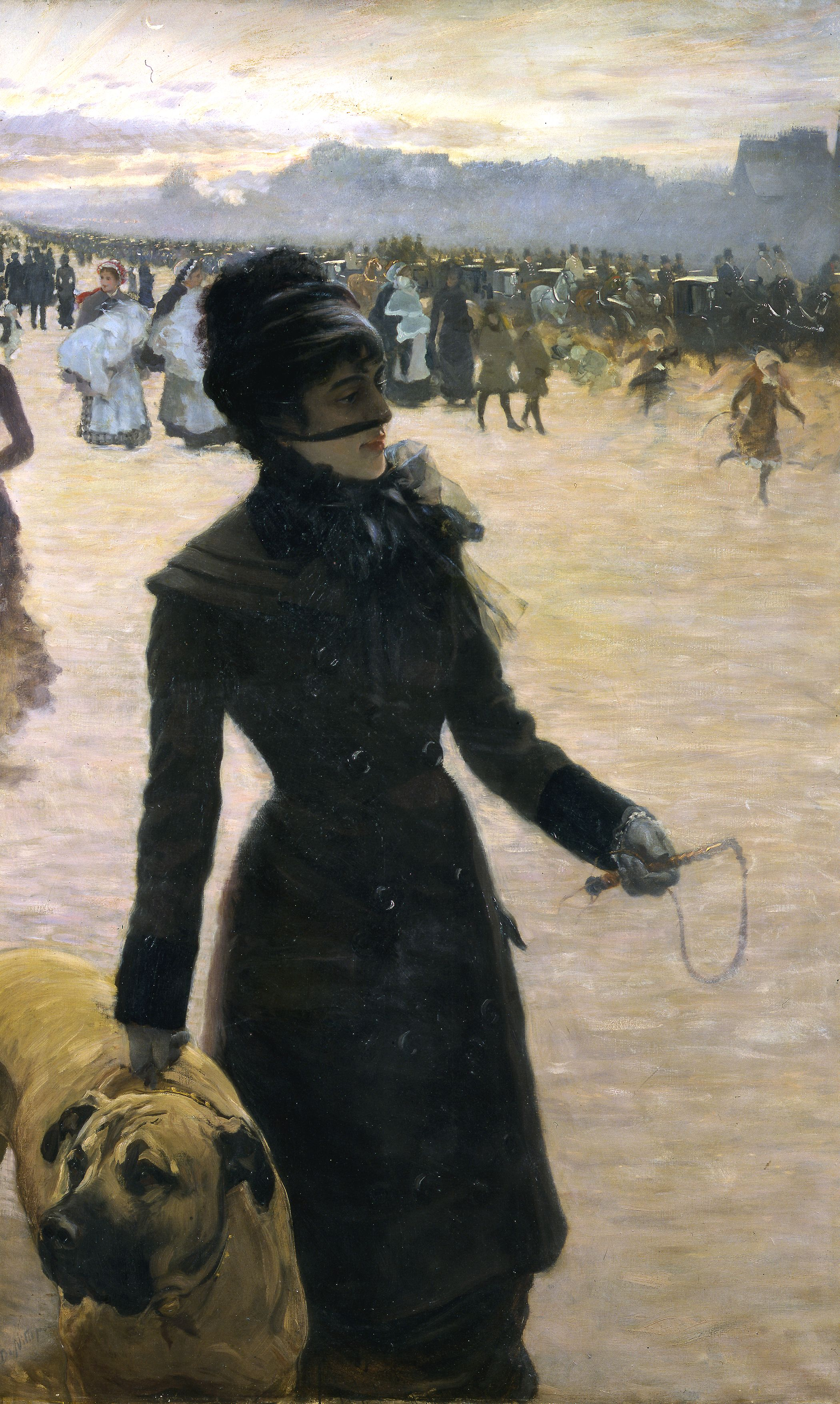
Lady Walking Her Dog, 1878

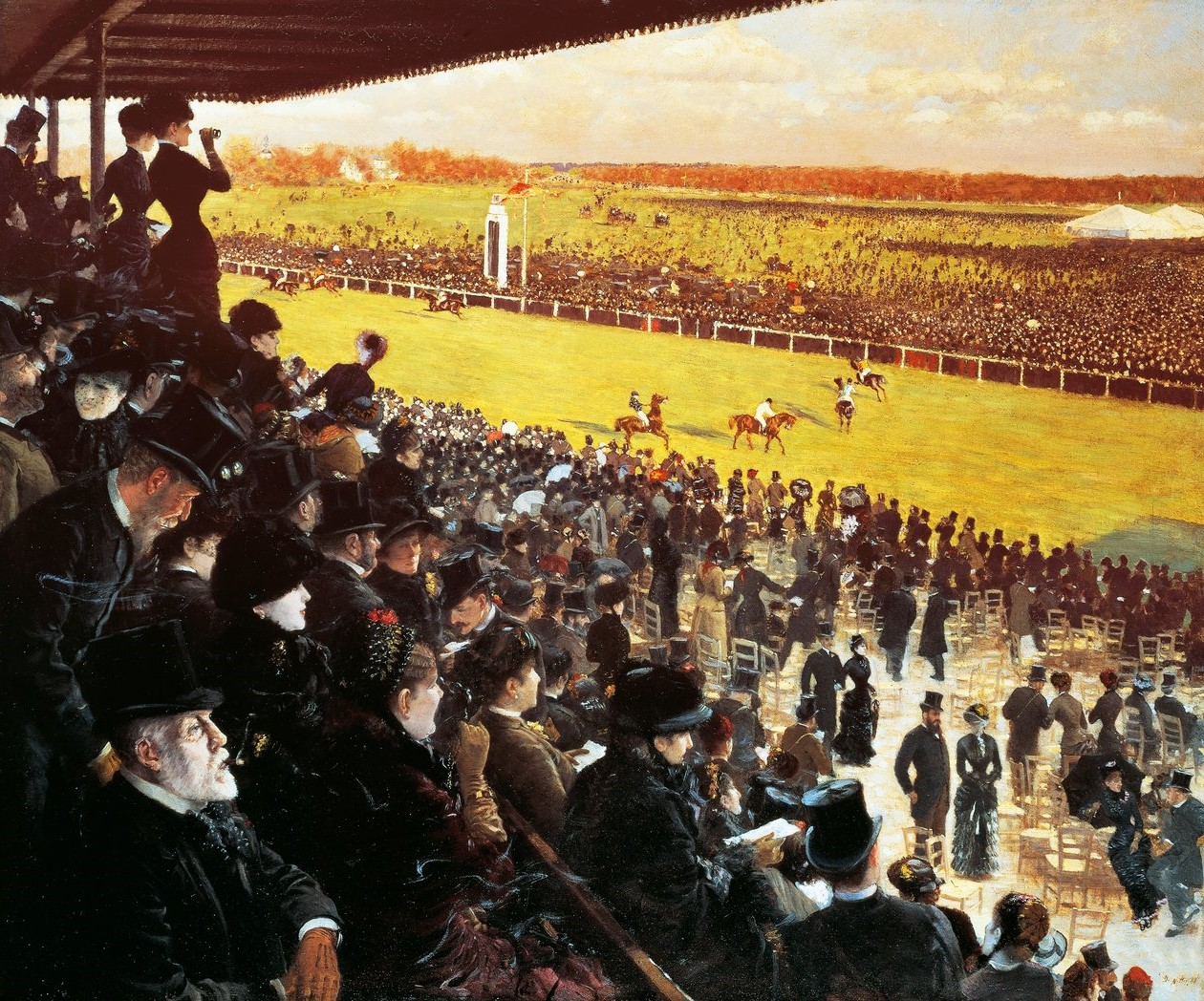
Races at Longchamps, 1883

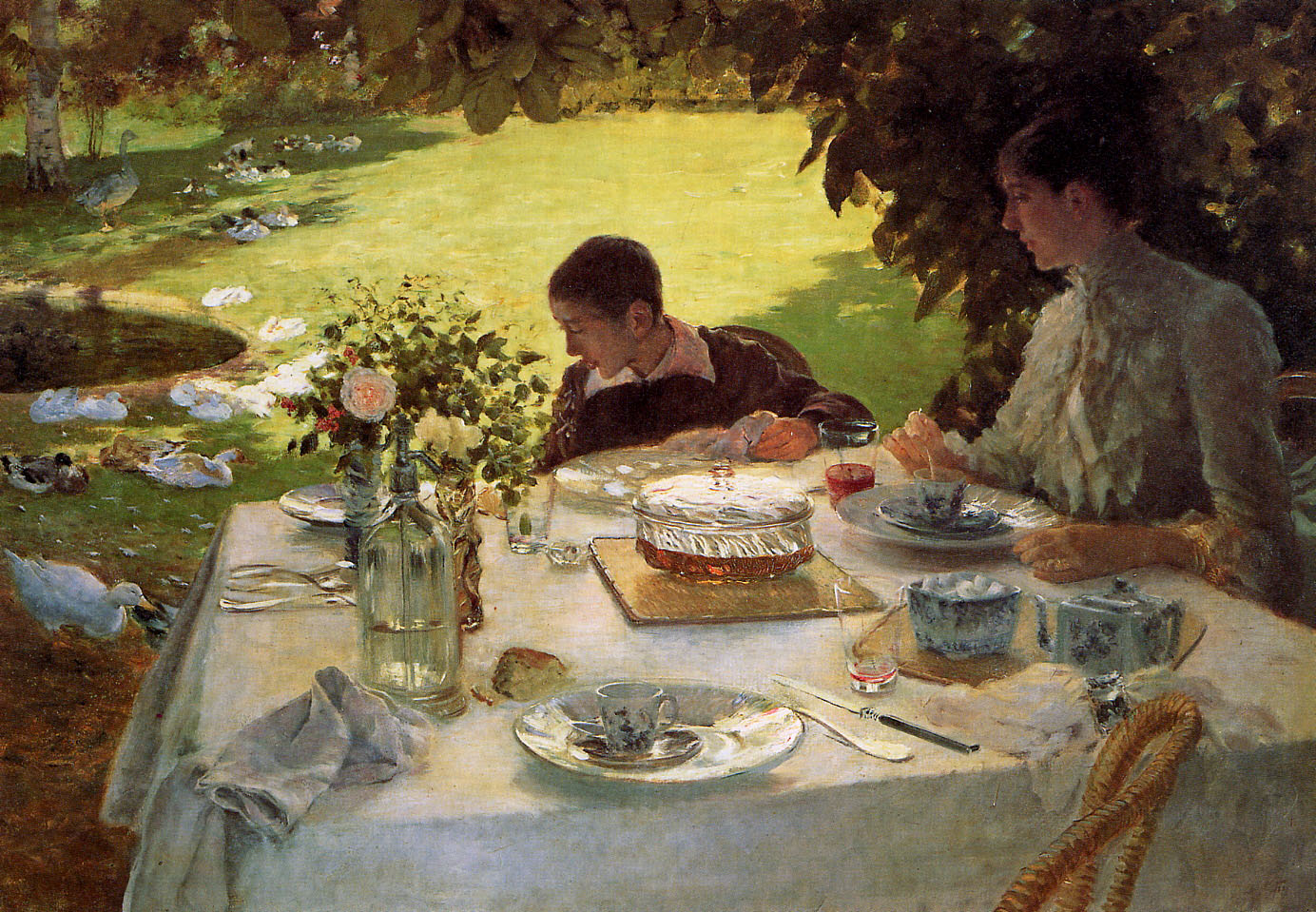
Breakfast in the Garden, 1884
