= Pinacoteca Giuseppe De Nittis =

Public gallery in Barletta, Italy

Coordinates: 41.3215°N 16.2818°E

- Pinacoteca Giuseppe De Nittis
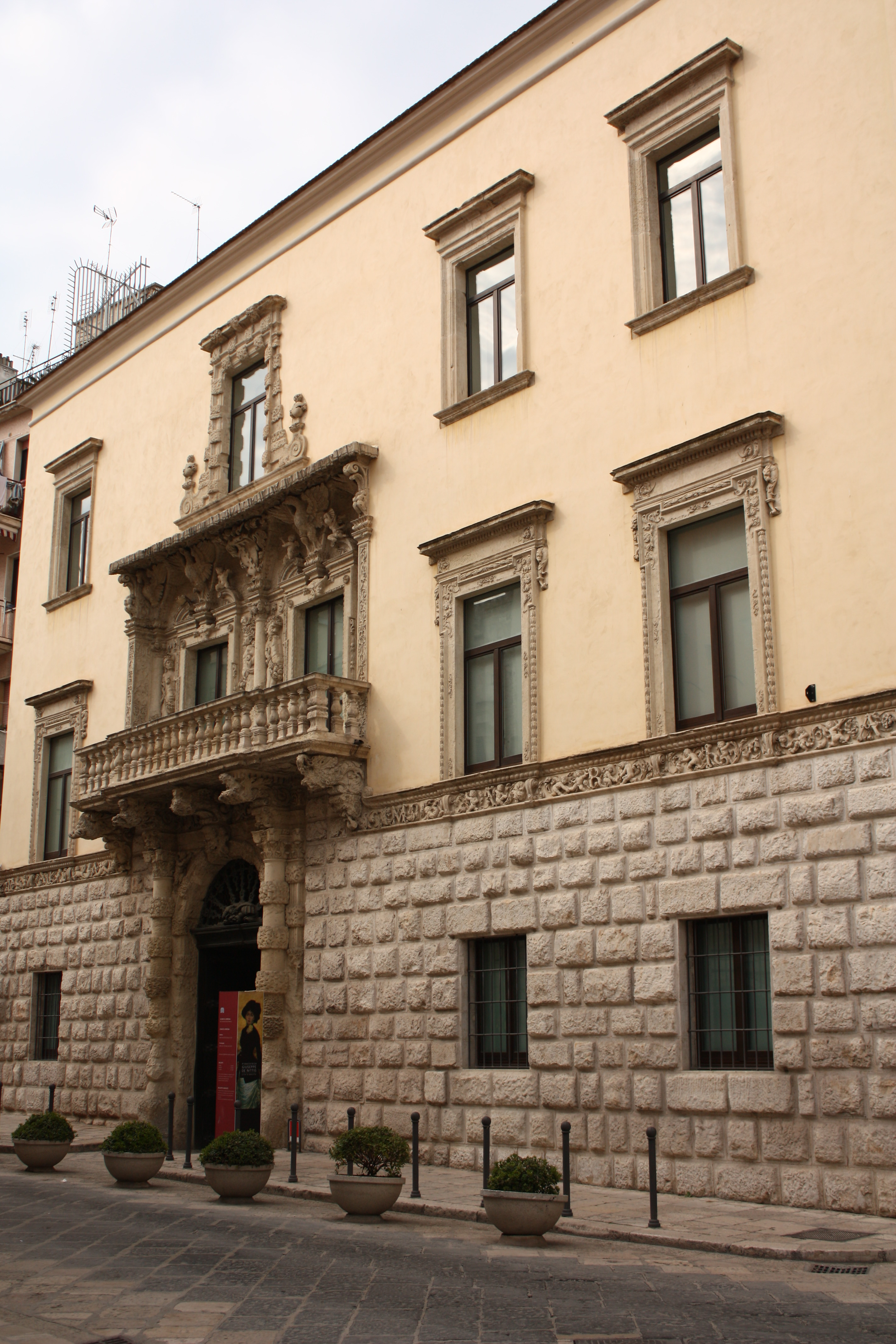
- Established: 12 November 1933
- Location: Via Cialdini 74, Barletta, Apulia
- Website: www.barlettamusei.it/denittis.html

The Pinacoteca Giuseppe De Nittis is an art museum and gallery in Barletta, Italy. The museum displays a range of artistic works from the Italian painter Giuseppe De Nittis, in his home city.

== History ==
The art gallery houses De Nittis's works donated to the city by his wife, Léontine Gruvelle. It was initially housed in the former Dominican convent on Via Cavour; later, after the renovation of Castle of Barletta, it was moved to the rooms on the first floor of the Federiciana fortress. However, the proximity to the sea, who was considered potentially hazardous, led to its relocation to the recently renovated Palazzo della Marra, in 2007.

The art gallery contains 146 paintings, 65 drawings and numerous publications. De Nittis production deals with different themes inspired by worldly places such as the depiction of cities and horse races. Also important are the en plein air scenes and portraits which in many cases feature Léontine as the model.

In 2023, the first American retrospective of the artist was held in Washington D.C.

In 2024, a major retrospective on the artist was held in Milan.

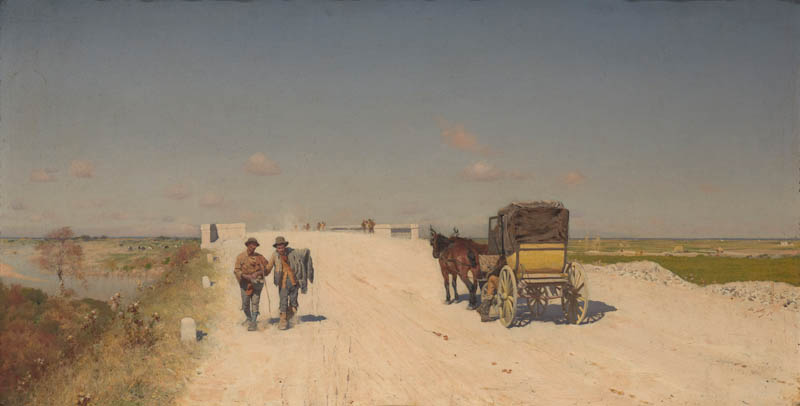
The Road from Naples to Brindisi (1872), by Giuseppe de Nittis

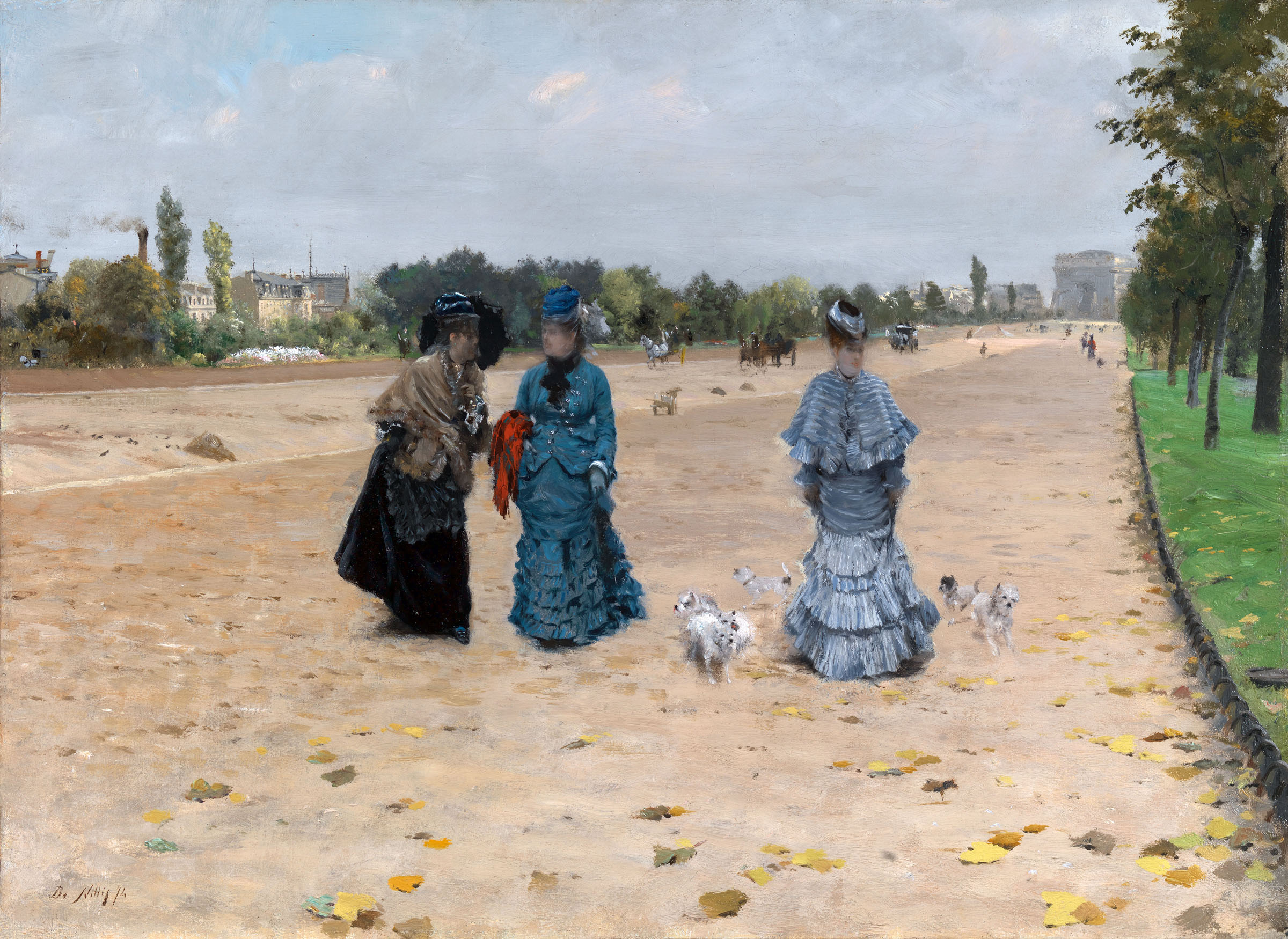
Avenue de Bois du Boulogne (1880), by Giuseppe de Nittis

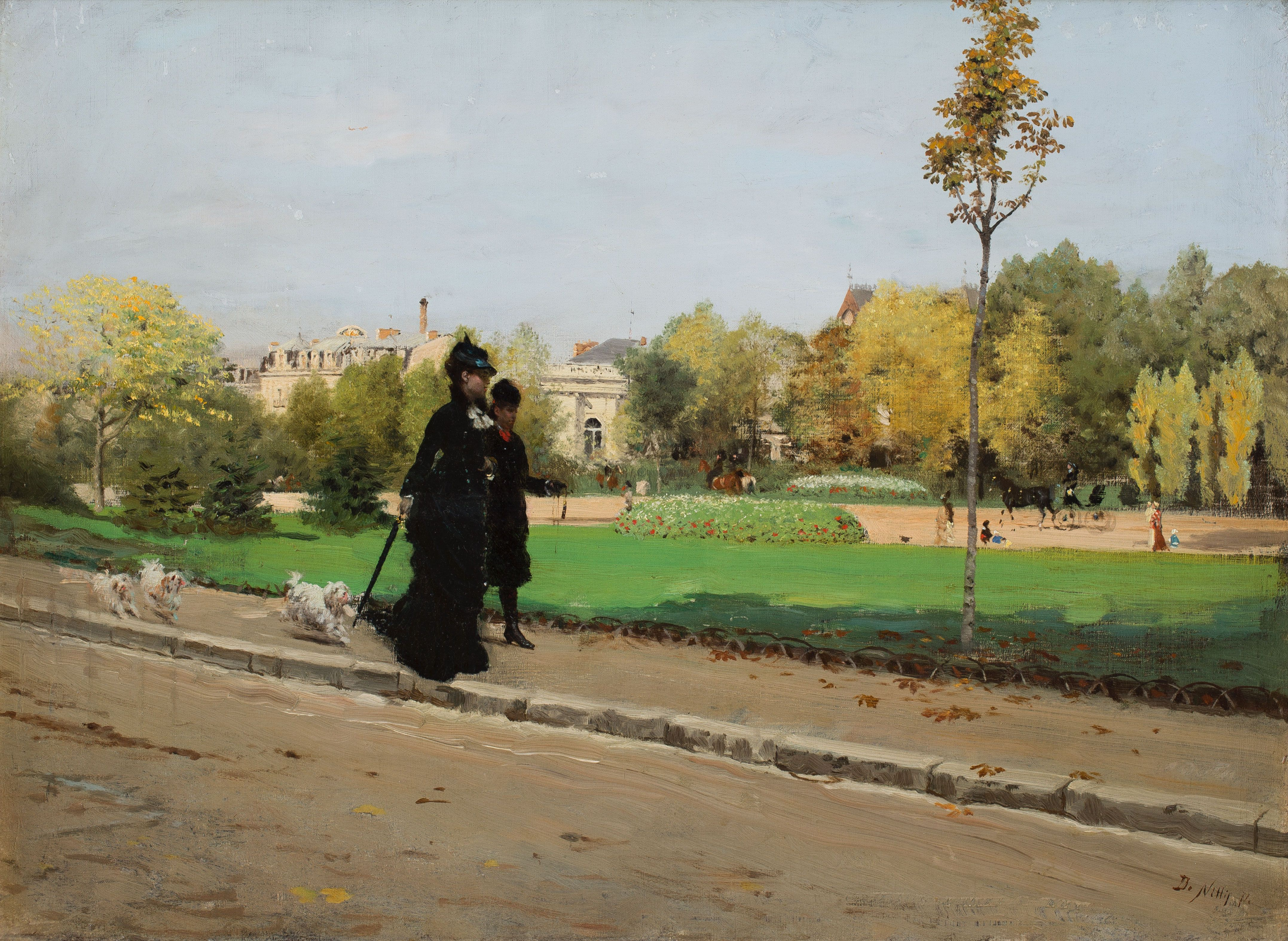
Walk with the Dogs (1874), by Giuseppe de Nittis

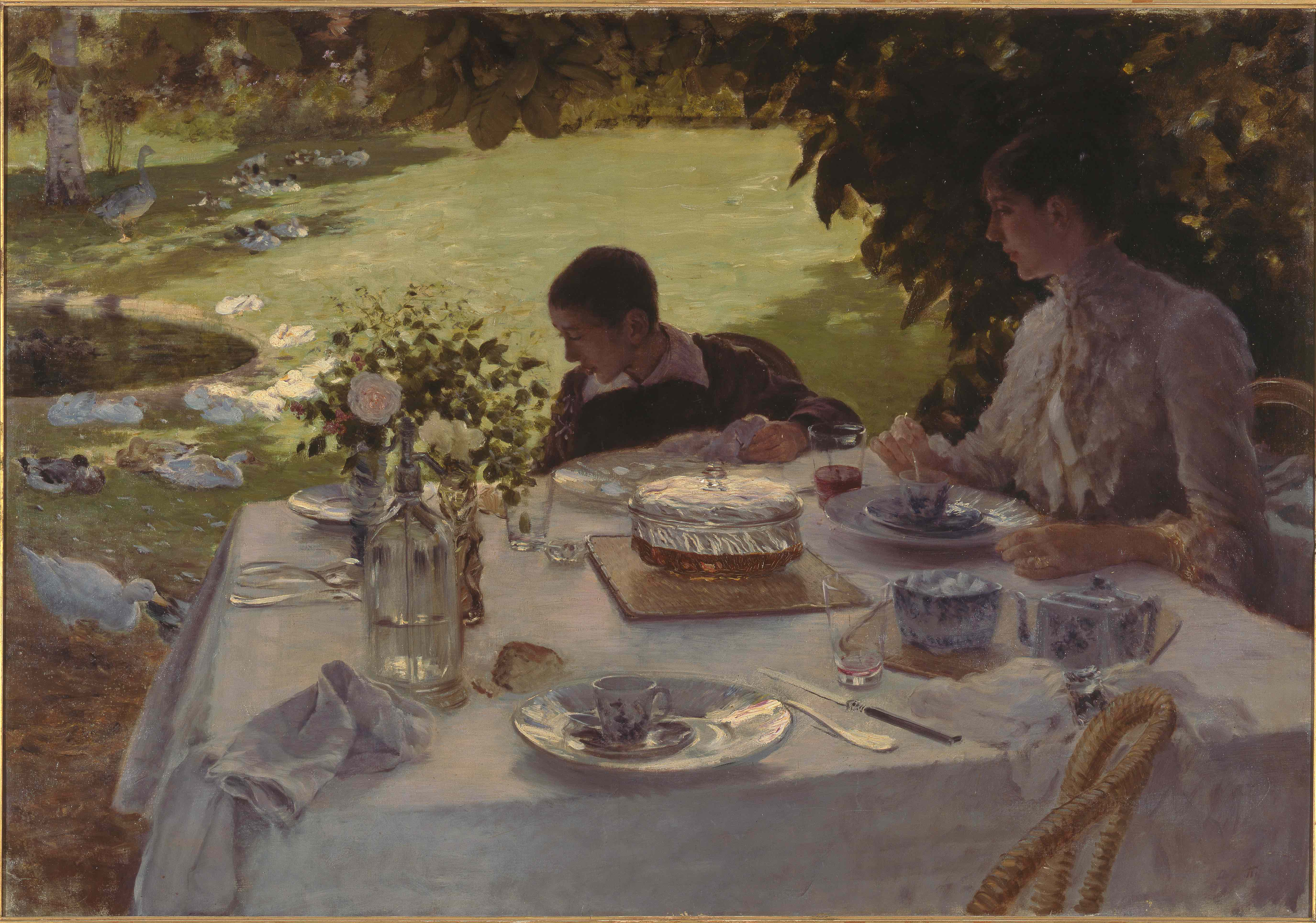
Breakfast in the Garden (1884), by Giuseppe de Nittis
