= Applied Arts Collection, Milan =

Applied Arts Collection of Milan
- Civiche Raccolte d'Arte Applicata di Milano
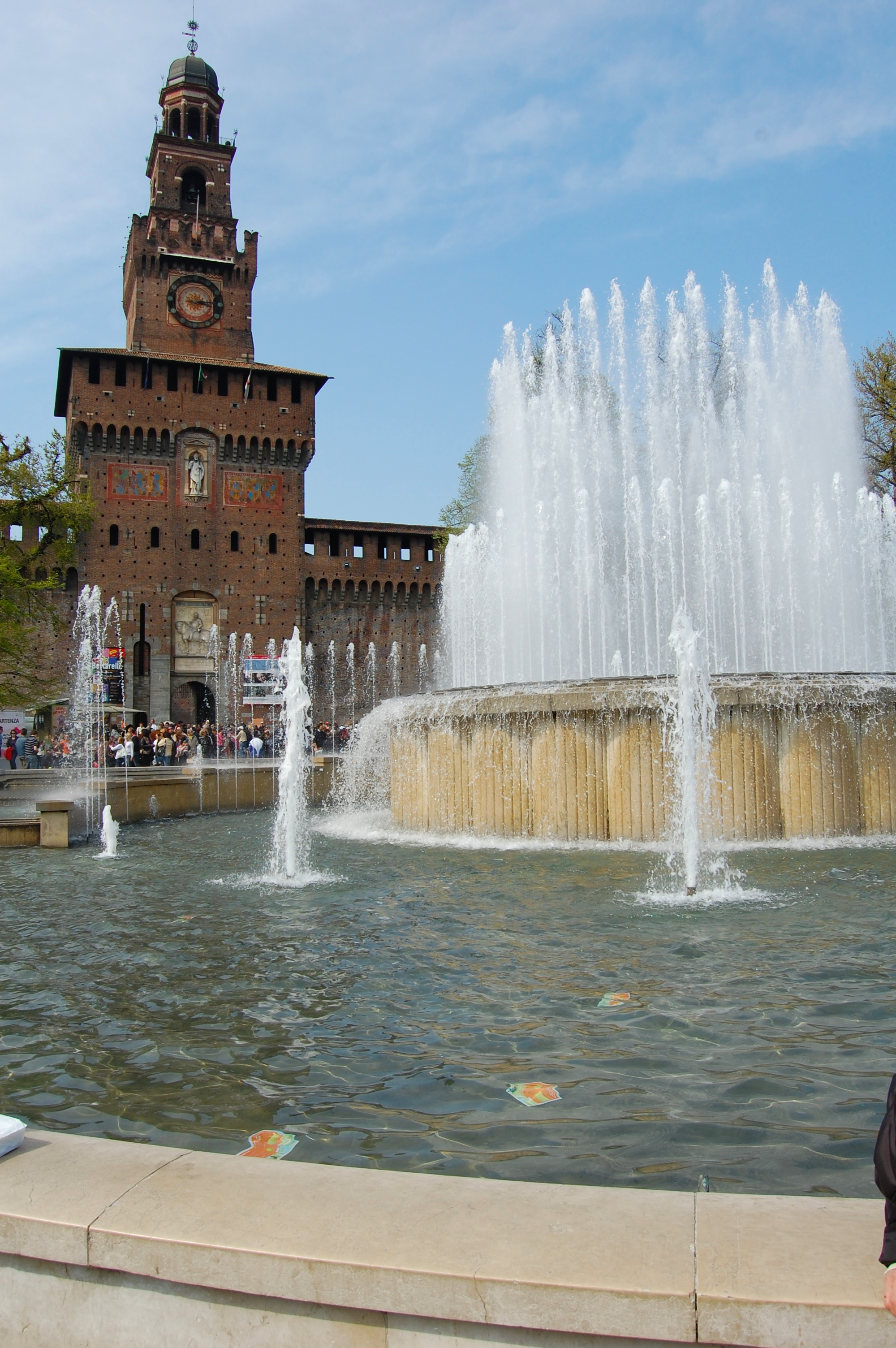
- The Sforza Castle
- Location: Piazza Castello 3, 20121, Milan, Italy
- Coordinates: 45°28′11″N 9°10′50″E
- Director: Claudio Salsi
- Website: www.milanocastello.it

The Applied Arts Collection of Milan (Raccolte d’Arte Applicata di Milano in Italian) is located in the Sforza Castle museum complex under the management of the municipality of Milan, Italy. The museum is divided into several sections with particular emphasis on jewelry, ivories, pottery and art glass.

The ceramic collection includes medieval, Renaissance and Baroque pottery, a maiolica group with pieces from 17th-century Lodi and Milan, and a collection of European chinaware and earthenware.

The collection of artistic glass includes the Gonzaga Cup, made of crystal clear glass and decorated with a pattern of small golden flowers and the Gonzaga coat of arm with a quadripartite black eagle on a white background.

In the Sala Della Balla is the Arazzi Trivulzio, a series of twelve tapestries representing the different months of the years. Their design is based on drawings by the Italian painter Bramantino.

== Gallery ==
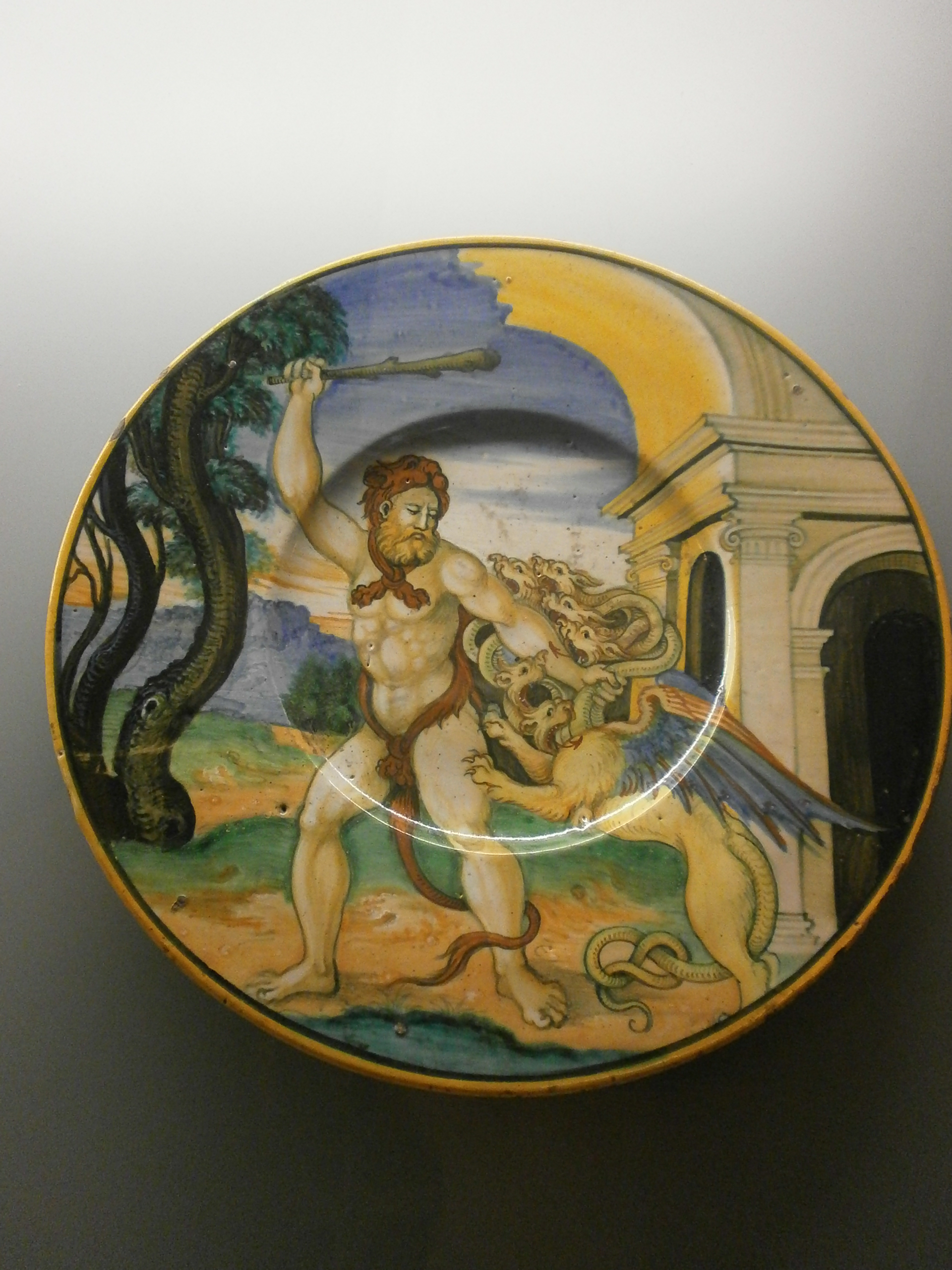
Hercules fighting the hydra, Nicola da Urbino, maiolica, 1525–35, Urbino.

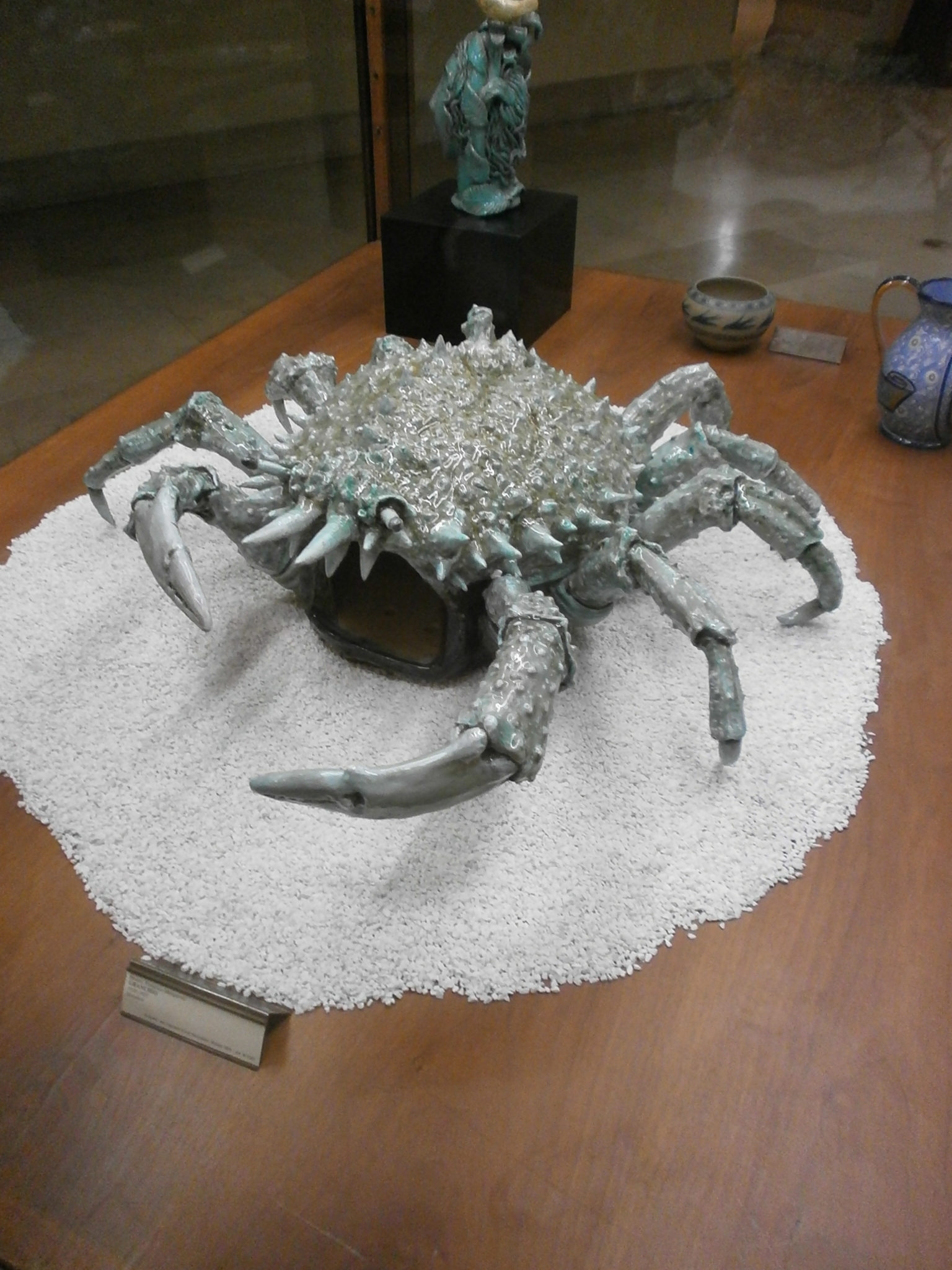
Crab, Ferruccio Mengaroni, maiolica, 1920–25, Pesaro.

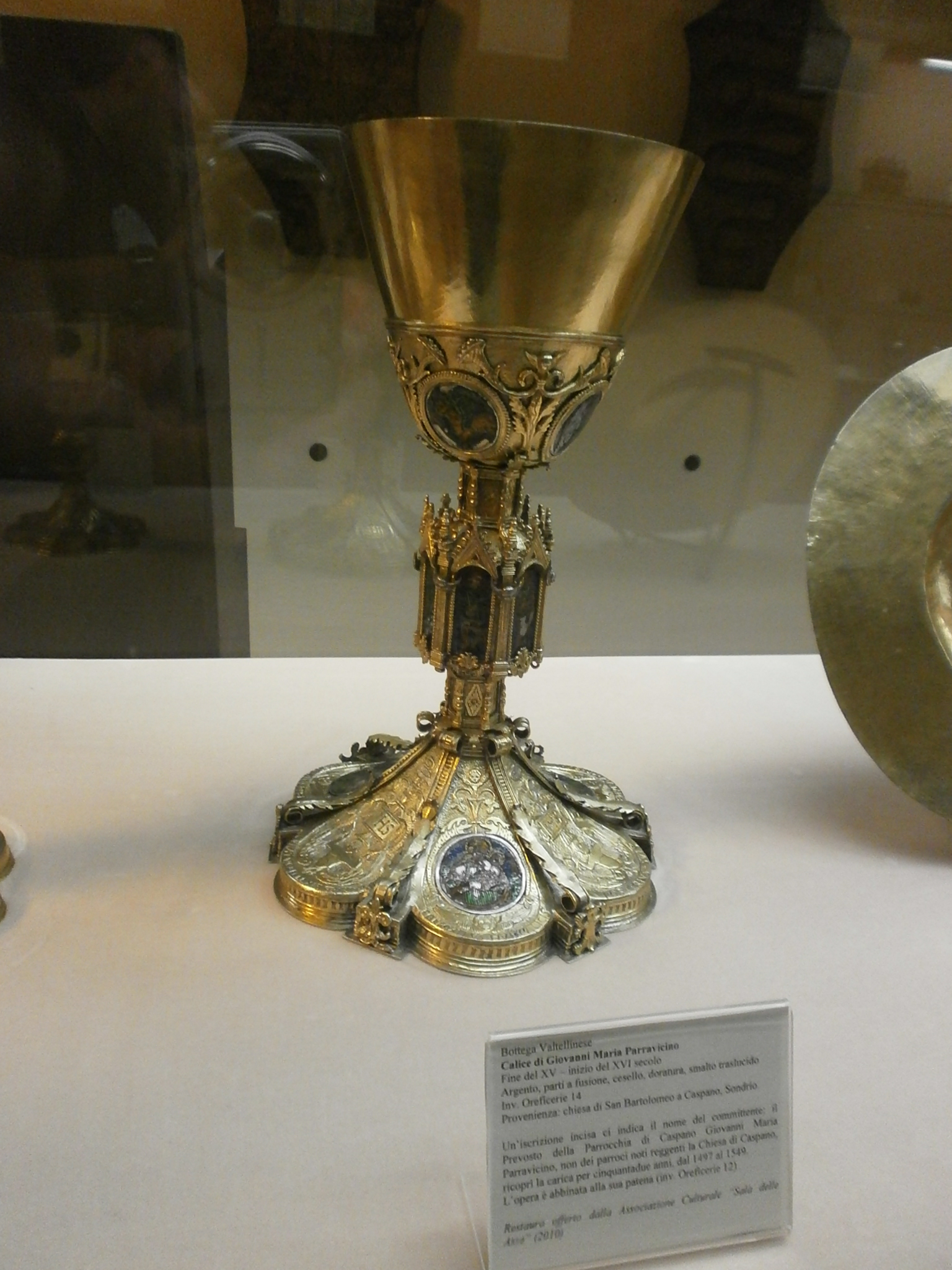
Cup of Giovanni Maria Parravicino, 15th-16th century, bottega valtellinese.

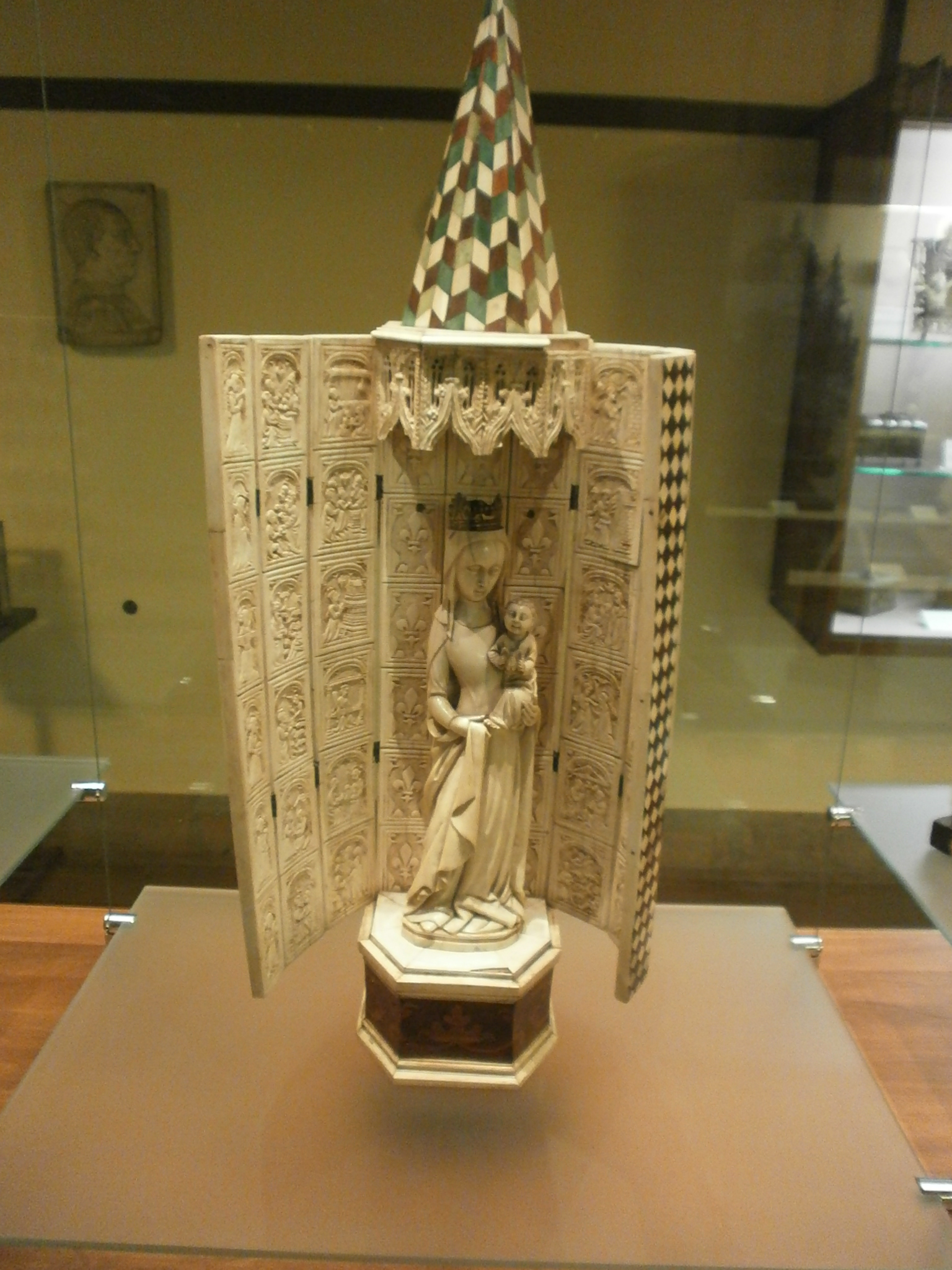
Tabernacle with stories of the Virgin and Jesus, 15th century, avory.

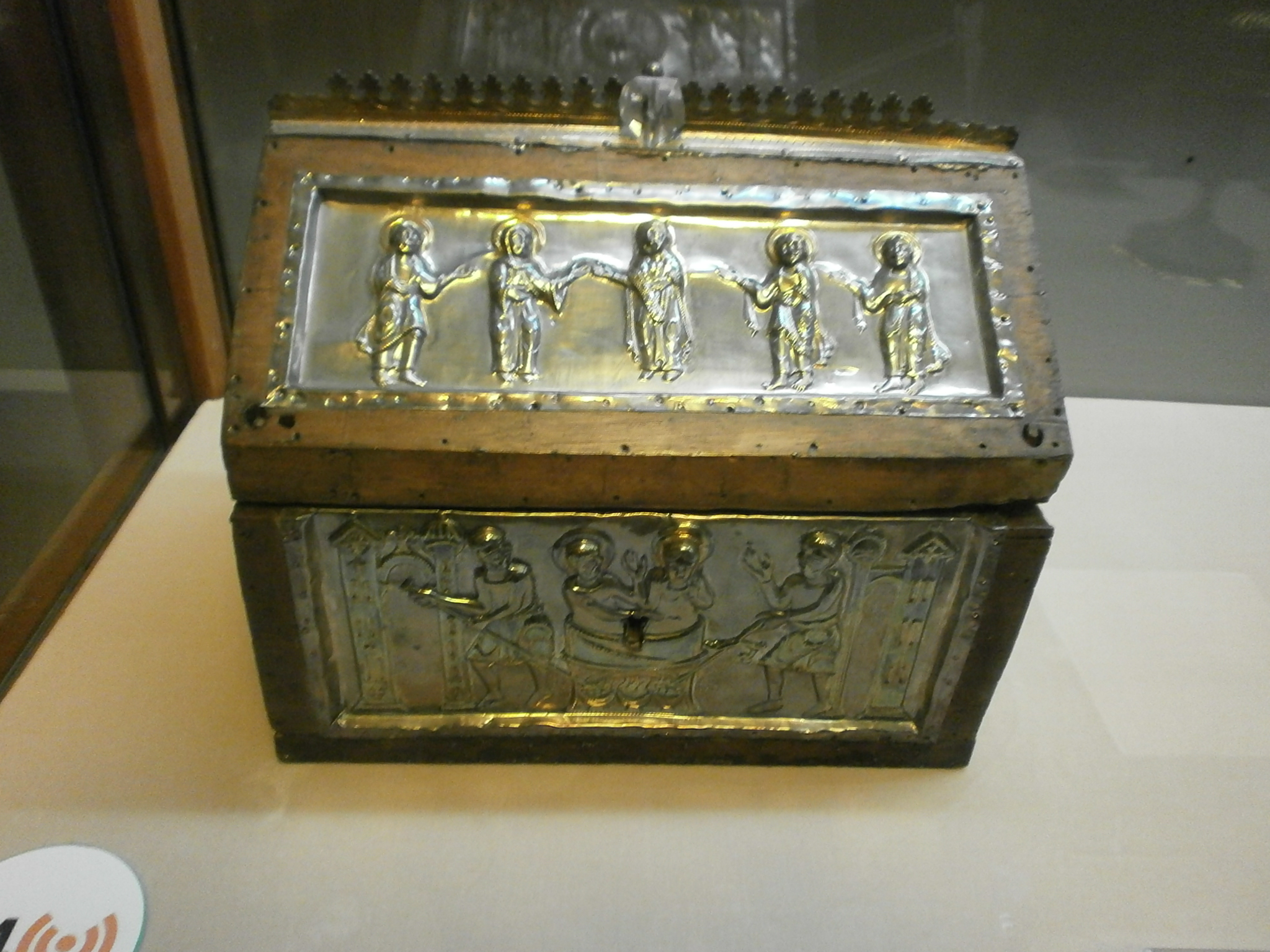
Deposit of Saint Cyprian and Justina, 11th century.

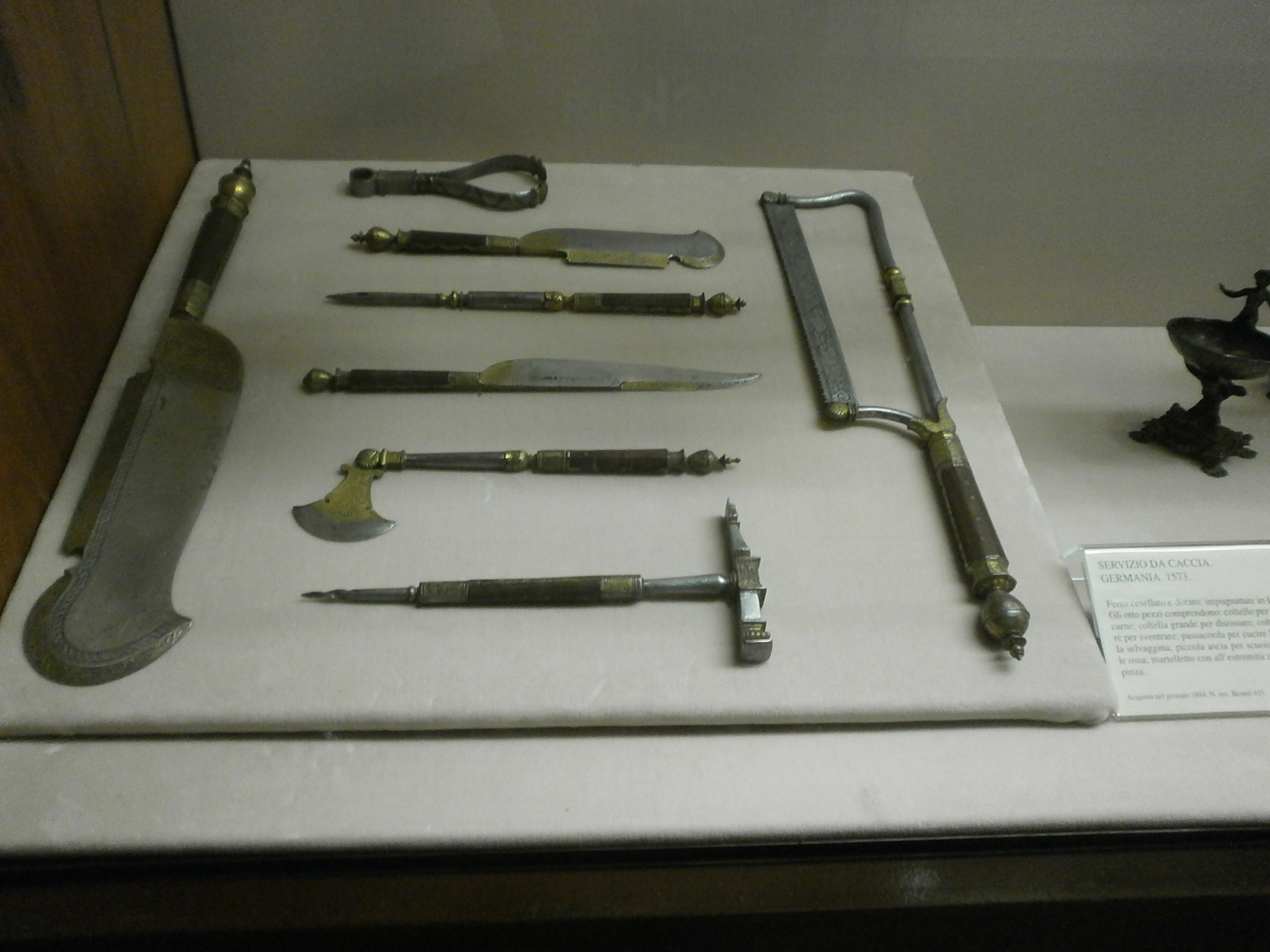
Hunting equipment, Germany, 1573, wrought iron and gilded.

== Sources ==
- Media related to Raccolte d'arte applicate del Castello Sforzesco di Milano at Wikimedia Commons
- Le città d'arte:Milano, Guide brevi Skira, ed.2008, autori vari. (Italian language edition)
- Milano e Provincia, Touring club Italiano, ed.2003, autori vari. (Italian language edition)
- Applied Arts Collection, Municipality Of Milan Website
